= 2006 Atlantic hurricane season =

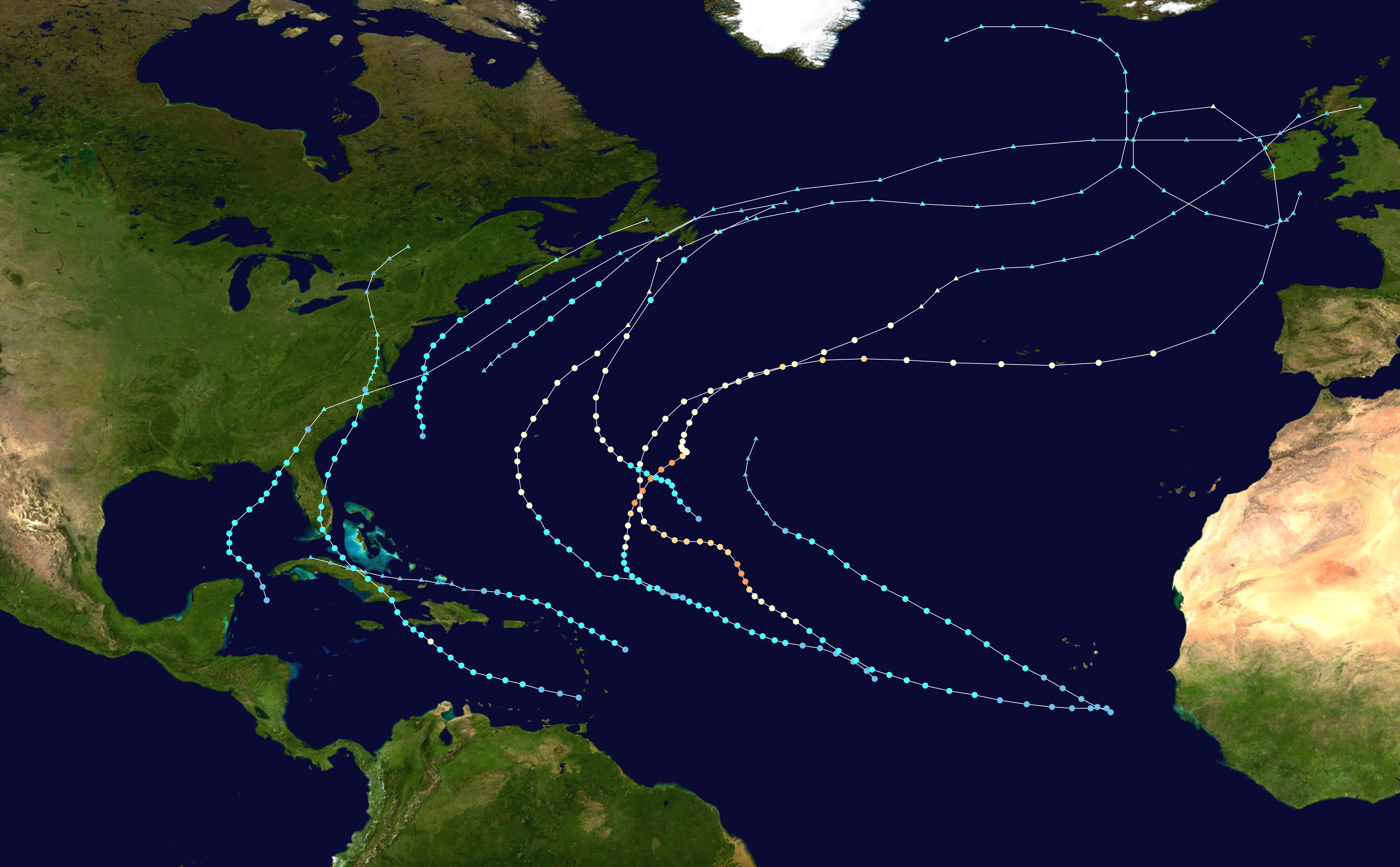
- Season summary map

Seasonal boundaries
- First system formed: June 10, 2006
- Last system dissipated: October 2, 2006

Strongest storm
- Name: Gordon and Helene
  - Maximum winds: 120 mph (195 km/h) (1-minute sustained)
  - Lowest pressure: 955 mbar (hPa; 28.2 inHg)

Seasonal statistics
- Total depressions: 10
- Total storms: 10
- Hurricanes: 5
- Major hurricanes (Cat. 3+): 2
- ACE: 78.5
- Total fatalities: 14 total
- Total damage: $504.42 million (2006 USD)

Related articles
- Timeline of the 2006 Atlantic hurricane season; 2006 Pacific hurricane season; 2006 Pacific typhoon season; 2006 North Indian Ocean cyclone season

The 2006 Atlantic hurricane season was the least active in the basin since 1997, with nine named storms as well as an additional unnamed tropical storm identified by the National Hurricane Center. 2006 was the first season since 2001 in which no hurricanes made landfall in the United States, and was the first since 1994 in which no tropical cyclones formed during October. Following the intense activity of 2003, 2004, and 2005, forecasters predicted that the 2006 season would be only slightly less active. Instead, it turned out to be a below average season, as activity was slowed by a rapidly forming moderate El Niño event, the presence of the Saharan Air Layer over the tropical Atlantic, and the steady presence of a robust secondary high-pressure area to the Azores High centered on Bermuda. There were no tropical cyclones after October 2.

The season began on June 10 with the formation of Tropical Storm Alberto, which moved from the Caribbean Sea through the east coast of the United States. Hurricane Ernesto caused heavy rainfall in Haiti, and directly killed at least seven in Haiti and the United States. Four hurricanes formed after Ernesto, including the strongest storms of the season, Hurricanes Helene and Gordon. In total, the season was responsible for 14 deaths and $500 million in damage. The calendar year 2006 also saw Tropical Storm Zeta, which arose in December 2005 and persisted until early January, only the second such event on record. The storm is considered a part of the 2005 season, as it developed in that calendar year.

== Seasonal forecasts ==
Forecasts of hurricane activity are issued before each hurricane season by Philip J. Klotzbach, Dr. William M. Gray, and their associates at Colorado State University; and separately by NOAA forecasters.

Klotzbach's team (formerly led by Gray) has defined the average number of storms per season (1950–2000) as 9.6 tropical storms, 5.9 hurricanes, and 2.3 major hurricanes (storms exceeding Category 3 strength in the Saffir–Simpson scale). A normal season, as defined by NOAA, has 6–14 named storms, with 4–8 of those reaching hurricane strength, and 1–3 major hurricanes.

Predictions of tropical activity in the 2006 season
Source	Date	Named storms	Hurricanes	Major hurricanes
CSU	Average (1950–2000)	9.6	5.9	2.3
NOAA	Average	6–14	4–8	1–3
Record high activity from 1950–2006		28	15	7
Record low activity from 1950–2006		4	2	0
CSU	December 5, 2005	17	9	5
CSU	April 4, 2006	17	9	5
NOAA	May 22, 2006	13–16	8–10	4–6
CSU	May 31, 2006	17	9	5
CSU	August 3, 2006	15	7	3
NOAA	August 8, 2006	12–15	7–9	3–4
CSU	September 1, 2006	13	5	2
CSU	October 3, 2006	11	6	2
Actual activity		10	5	2

=== Pre-season forecasts ===
On December 5, 2005, Klotzbach's team issued its initial extended-range forecast for the 2006 season, predicting an above average of 17 named storms, nine of them hurricanes, and five classified as Category 3 intensity or higher.

As in the 2005 season, the team predicted it was highly probable that at least one major hurricane would directly impact the United States. The forecast suggested an 81% probability that at least one major hurricane would strike the U.S. mainland, a 64% chance of at least one major hurricane striking the East Coast of the United States (including the Florida peninsula), and a 47% chance of at least one major hurricane striking the Gulf Coast of the United States from the Florida Panhandle westward. The team also predicted that the potential for major hurricane activity in the Caribbean was above average. A few months later, on April 4, 2006, CSU issued another forecast confirming its December predictions.

On May 22, 2006, NOAA released its pre-season forecast for the 2006 season. The prediction was for 13–16 named storms, 8–10 of those becoming hurricanes, and 4–6 becoming major hurricanes.

On May 31, 2006, Klotzbach's team released its final pre-season forecast for 2006, confirming its earlier prediction.

=== Midseason outlooks ===
On August 3, 2006, Klotzbach's team lowered its season estimate to 15 named storms, with 7 becoming hurricanes and 3 becoming major hurricanes, noting that conditions had become less favorable for storms than they had been earlier in the year. The sea-level pressure and trade wind strength in the tropical Atlantic were reported to be above normal, while sea surface temperature anomalies were on a decreasing trend.

On August 8, 2006, NOAA revised its season estimate to 12–15 named storms, with 7–9 becoming hurricanes, and 3–4 becoming major hurricanes. The reduction was attributed to less favorable environmental conditions, a decrease in La Niña conditions, and the lack of a "very persistent upper-level ridge pattern over the eastern U.S. and western Atlantic".

On September 1, Klotzbach's team also revised its season estimate, to 13 named storms, 5 hurricanes, and 2 major hurricanes, citing a larger volume of the Saharan Air Layer and an El Niño trend in the Pacific. The team again reduced the number of tropical storms expected for the season a month later, on October 3, with an updated forecast of 11 named storms, 6 hurricanes, and 2 major hurricanes, citing the ongoing El Niño.

== Seasonal summary ==
Satellite image on September 18 of Hurricane Gordon on the top, with Hurricane Helene to the bottom

Tropical Storm Zeta formed on December 30, 2005, and lasted until January 6, 2006. Although the majority of its existence occurred in 2006, it is officially a storm of the 2005 Atlantic hurricane season as that is the year in which it formed. Zeta joined Hurricane Alice as only the second North Atlantic tropical cyclone in recorded history to span two calendar years.

The season started on June 1, 2006, and officially ended on November 30, 2006. These dates conventionally delimit the period of each year when most tropical cyclones form in the Atlantic basin. Ten days into the start of the season, Tropical Storm Alberto developed in the Caribbean, and after four months of activity, Hurricane Isaac dissipated on October 3 south of Newfoundland. Compared to the devastating 2005 Atlantic hurricane season, 2006 was not severe in terms of deaths and damage. Three tropical storms made landfall in the United States. The first of them, Tropical Storm Alberto, made landfall in Florida with winds of 50 mph (80 km/h), causing flooding and light damage. Tropical Storm Beryl made landfall on Nantucket, but left little impact. The third and more significant storm was Hurricane Ernesto, which killed two people in Virginia and two in Florida, as well as causing $500 million in damage (2006 USD). During the season, only one tropical cyclone in the Atlantic – Alberto – affected Mexico. Canada was affected by several tropical cyclones during 2006, including Alberto, the unnamed storm, Beryl, Florence, and Isaac.

On June 20, an upper-level disturbance formed east of the Bahamas and moved westward across the islands. Between June 24 and 26, areas of convection developed occasionally, and a low-level disturbance formed. The system turned northward and upon reaching the Gulf Stream on June 27, it began to mature. It made landfall near Morehead City, North Carolina and moved northeastward along the U.S. East Coast. The storm contributed to severe and deadly flooding in the Mid-Atlantic states. While the NHC did not operationally classify it, data from reconnaissance aircraft, NEXRAD weather radar, and surface observations suggest it may have met the criteria for a tropical cyclone.

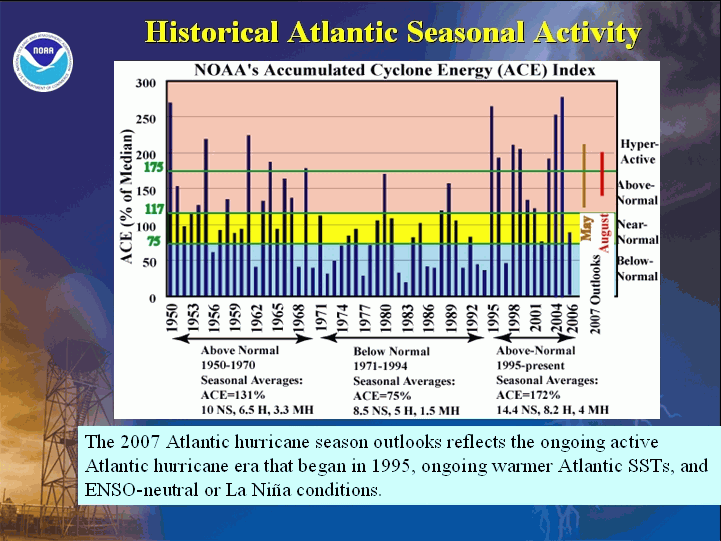
A graph showing averages and statistics for Atlantic hurricane seasons

The National Hurricane Center's pre-season activity outlook predicted 13–16 named storms, 8–10 hurricanes and 4–6 major hurricanes. They also predicted a high risk of at least one major hurricane strike to the Southeastern United States. In the event, only ten storms formed during the season, the lowest number since the 1997 season, when there were seven. Five of the ten storms developed into hurricanes— the lowest number since 2002– only two attained major hurricane status, tying with 2002 for the fewest since 1997. Only one named storm was observed during October, the lowest number since 1994, when none were seen during that month. Additionally, only three named storms made landfall in the United States, the fewest since 2001. Because of several factors, including a rapidly forming El Niño event, the Saharan Air Layer over the tropical Atlantic and the presence of a high-pressure area to the Azores High situated near Bermuda, it contributed to a below average season. Also, sea surface temperatures in the western Atlantic were just at or slightly below average. In contrast, sea surface temperatures during the 2005 season were well above average.

Overall, the season's activity was reflected with a low cumulative accumulated cyclone energy (ACE) rating of 78.5. ACE is, broadly speaking, a measure of the power of the hurricane multiplied by the length of time it existed, so storms that last a long time, as well as particularly strong hurricanes, have high ACEs. ACE is only calculated for full advisories on tropical systems at or exceeding 34 knots (39 mph; 63 km/h) or tropical storm strength. Subtropical cyclones are excluded from the total.

== Systems ==
=== Tropical Storm Alberto ===
- Tropical storm (SSHWS)
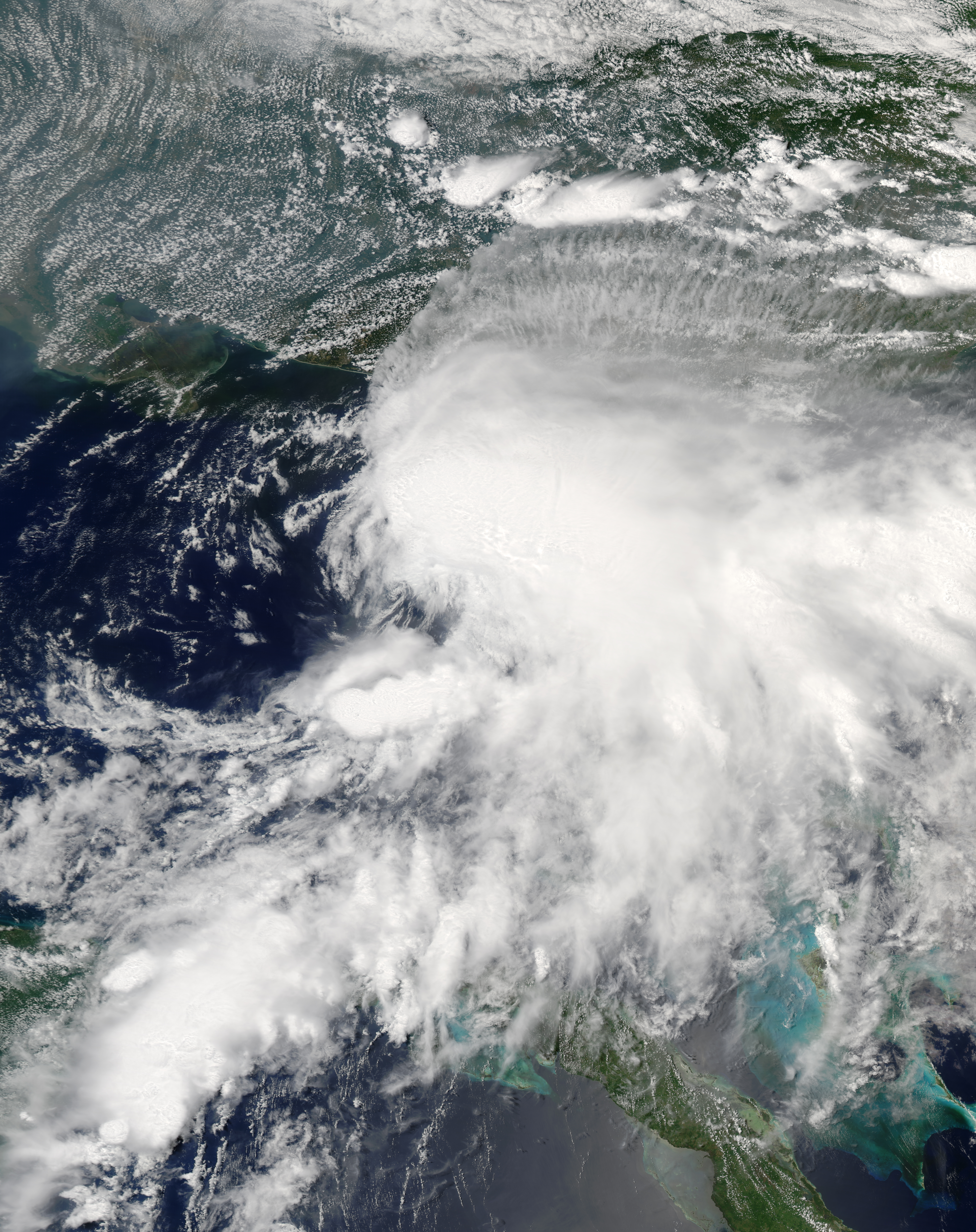
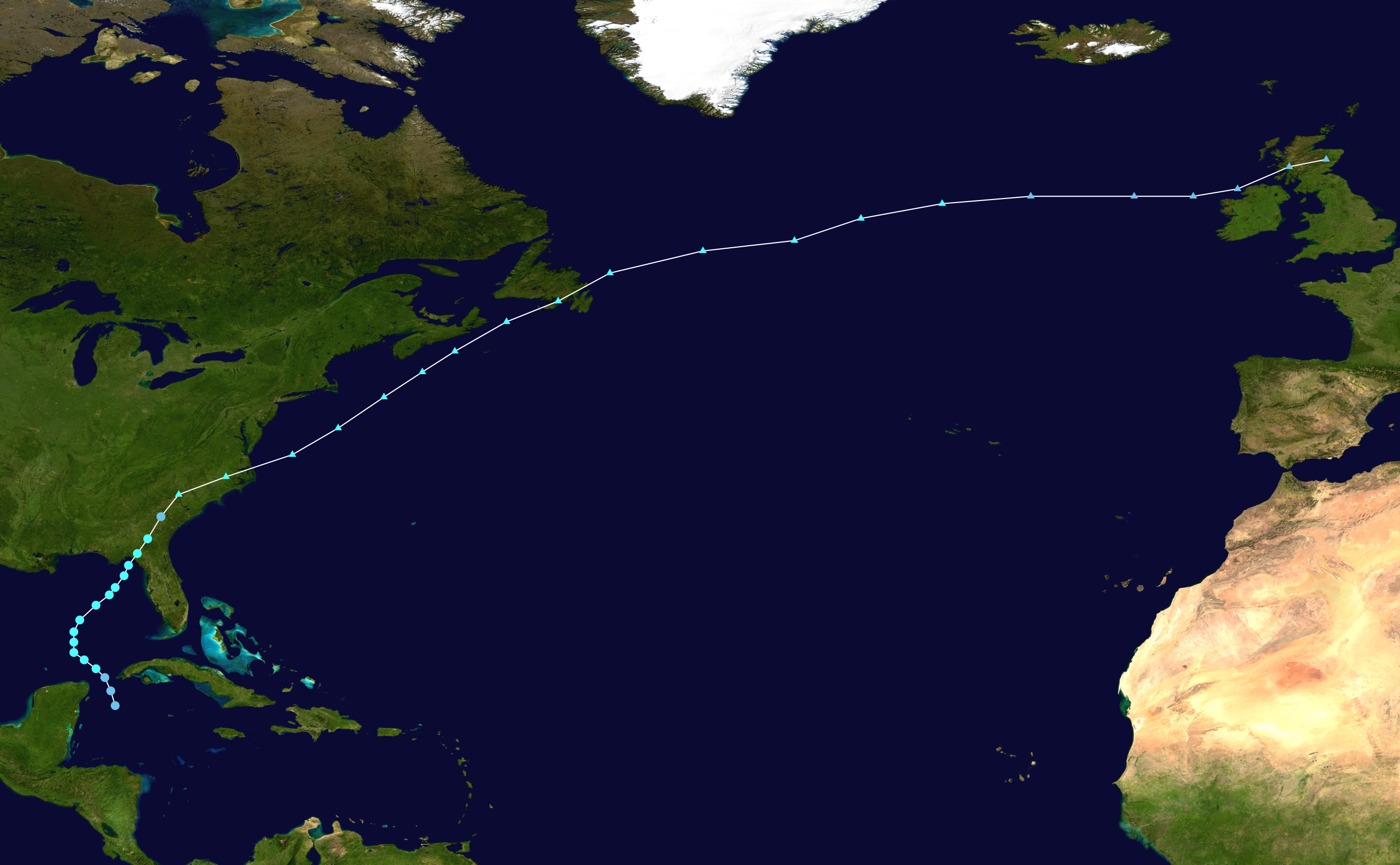
- Duration: June 10 – June 14
- Peak intensity: 70 mph (110 km/h) (1-min); 995 mbar (hPa)

On June 10, an area of disturbed weather associated with a broad low-pressure area off the coast of Belize organized over the warm waters of the Caribbean into the first tropical depression of the season. It dropped light rainfall in Mexico, with a 24-hour total peaking at 4 inches (100 mm) in Peto, Yucatán. Southwesterly vertical wind shear initially prevented significant development, but as it moved closer to Florida, the depression strengthened into a tropical storm on June 11. Passing over the warm, deep water of the Loop Current allowed accelerated development, and the cyclone reached its peak winds of 70 mph (110 km/h), just shy of hurricane strength. Subsequent weakening occurred as it moved over the cooler waters of the continental shelf, and Alberto made landfall near Adams Beach, Florida, on June 14 with winds of about 45 mph (72 km/h). Losing its tropical characteristics, Alberto moved northeastward and produced heavy rainfall in South Carolina and North Carolina. The remnants tracked off the U.S. East Coast and transitioned into a powerful extratropical storm which affected Nova Scotia with high winds, heavy rain, and rough surf, leaving four fisherman missing offshore.

Alberto caused record rainfall in North Carolina, peaking at 8 inches (200 mm). In Florida, two people died, and damage was estimated at $250,000 (2006 USD). Later, the storm left four sailors missing about 230 miles (370 km) south of Nova Scotia.

=== Unnamed tropical storm ===
- Tropical storm (SSHWS)
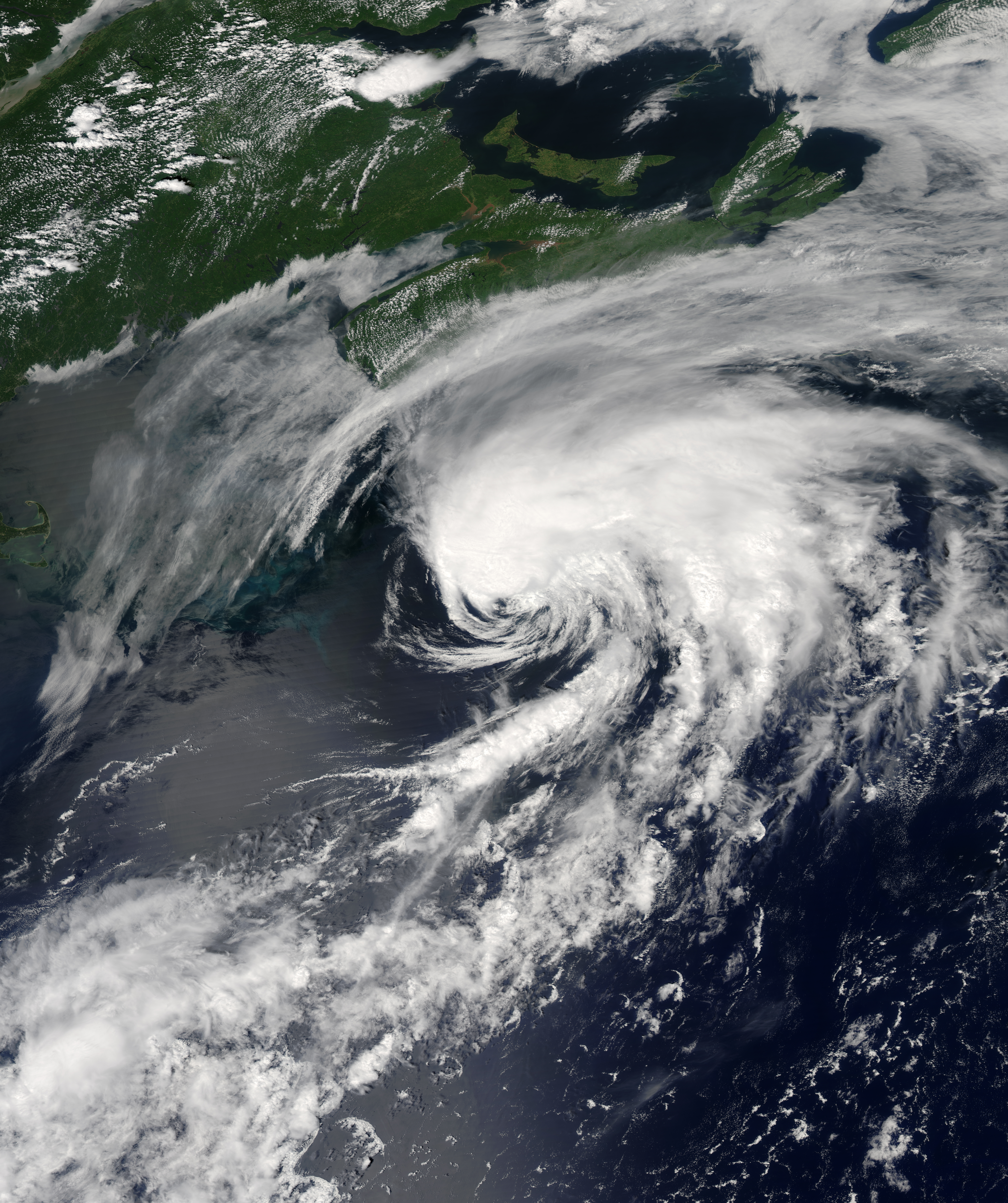
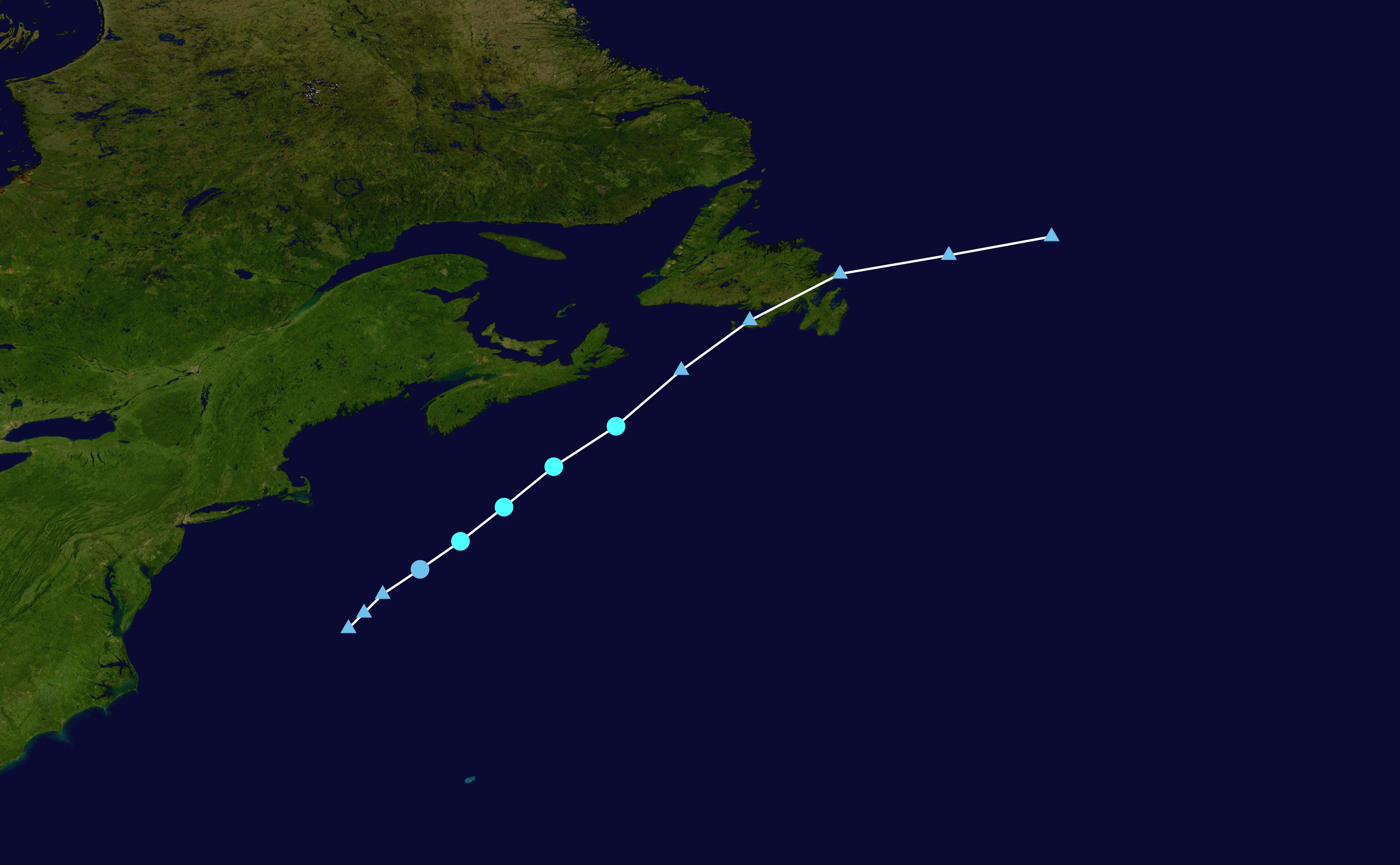
- Duration: July 17 – July 18
- Peak intensity: 50 mph (85 km/h) (1-min); 998 mbar (hPa)

A cold front exited the eastern United States on July 13 and subsequently stalled over the western Atlantic Ocean. It decayed and dissipated, leaving behind two areas of low pressure. The southern area near North Carolina became Tropical Storm Beryl, and the northern system became an extratropical low on July 16, south-southeast of Cape Cod, Massachusetts. The system separated itself from the dissipating front later that day while moving northeastward over warm waters. Convection developed near the center, and the system transitioned into a tropical depression early on July 17, about 240 miles (390 km) southeast of Nantucket, Massachusetts. Accelerating northeastward, the depression intensified into a tropical storm six hours later. Banding features became prominent, and after continued strengthening, the storm attained peak winds of 50 mph (80 km/h) late on July 17, while located about 245 miles (394 km) south of Halifax, Nova Scotia. Shortly thereafter, the storm encountered much cooler water temperatures after leaving the Gulf Stream. The storm quickly weakened as the convection rapidly diminished, and on July 18, degenerated into a non-convective remnant low. The remnants crossed Newfoundland, before turning to the east-northeast and dissipating on July 19. The storm greatly weakened prior to moving across Newfoundland, and as a result, its impact was minimal.

Operationally, the storm was considered as a non-tropical gale, connected to a cold front. However, a post-season analysis provided enough evidence of tropical characteristics, indicating no frontal features and no cold air intrusion at the time of peak winds. Observations analyzed the storm as having a symmetric warm core, whereas in real time it was considered subtropical. The National Hurricane Center officially re-classified the system as an unnamed tropical storm on December 15, 2006.

=== Tropical Storm Beryl ===
- Tropical storm (SSHWS)
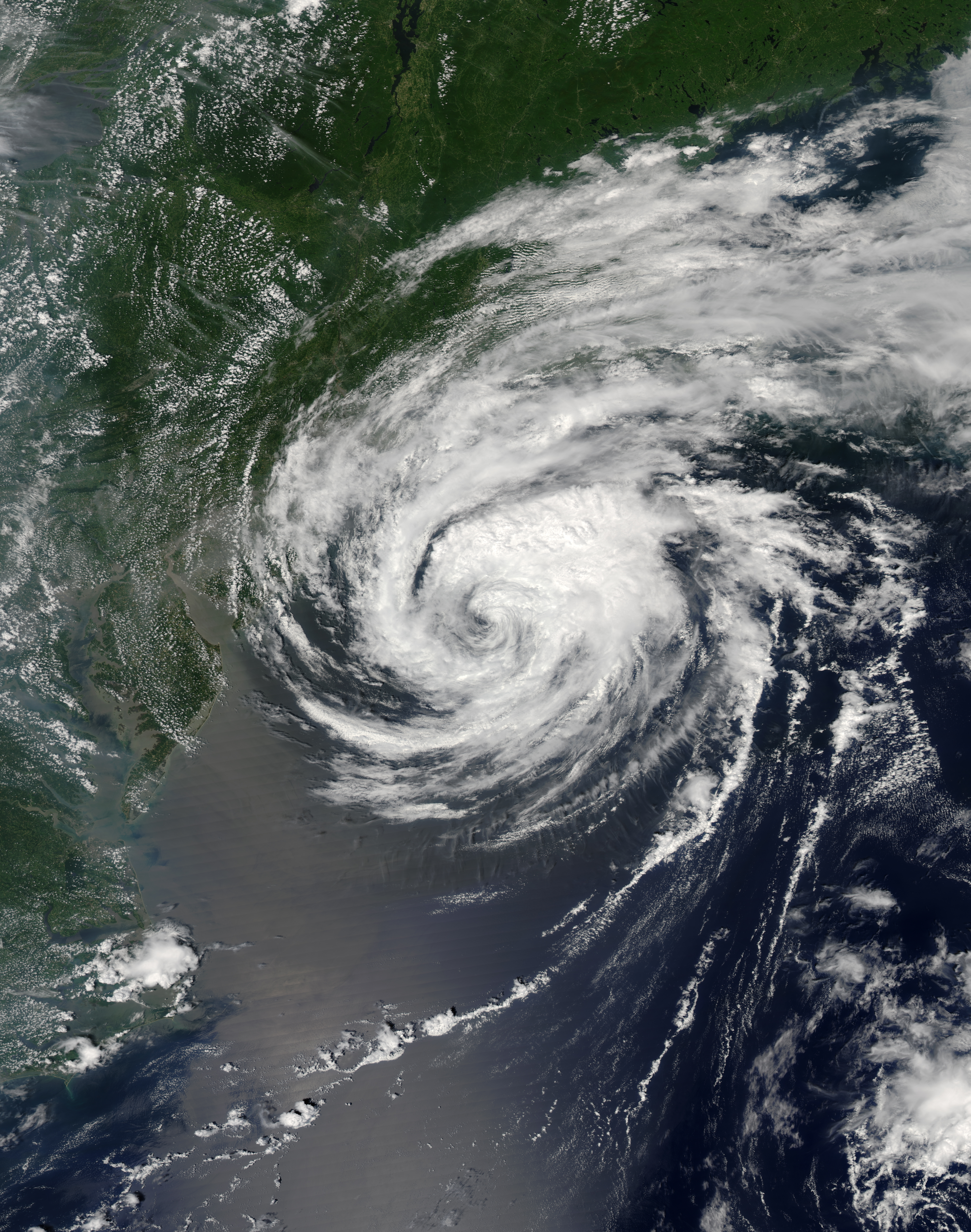
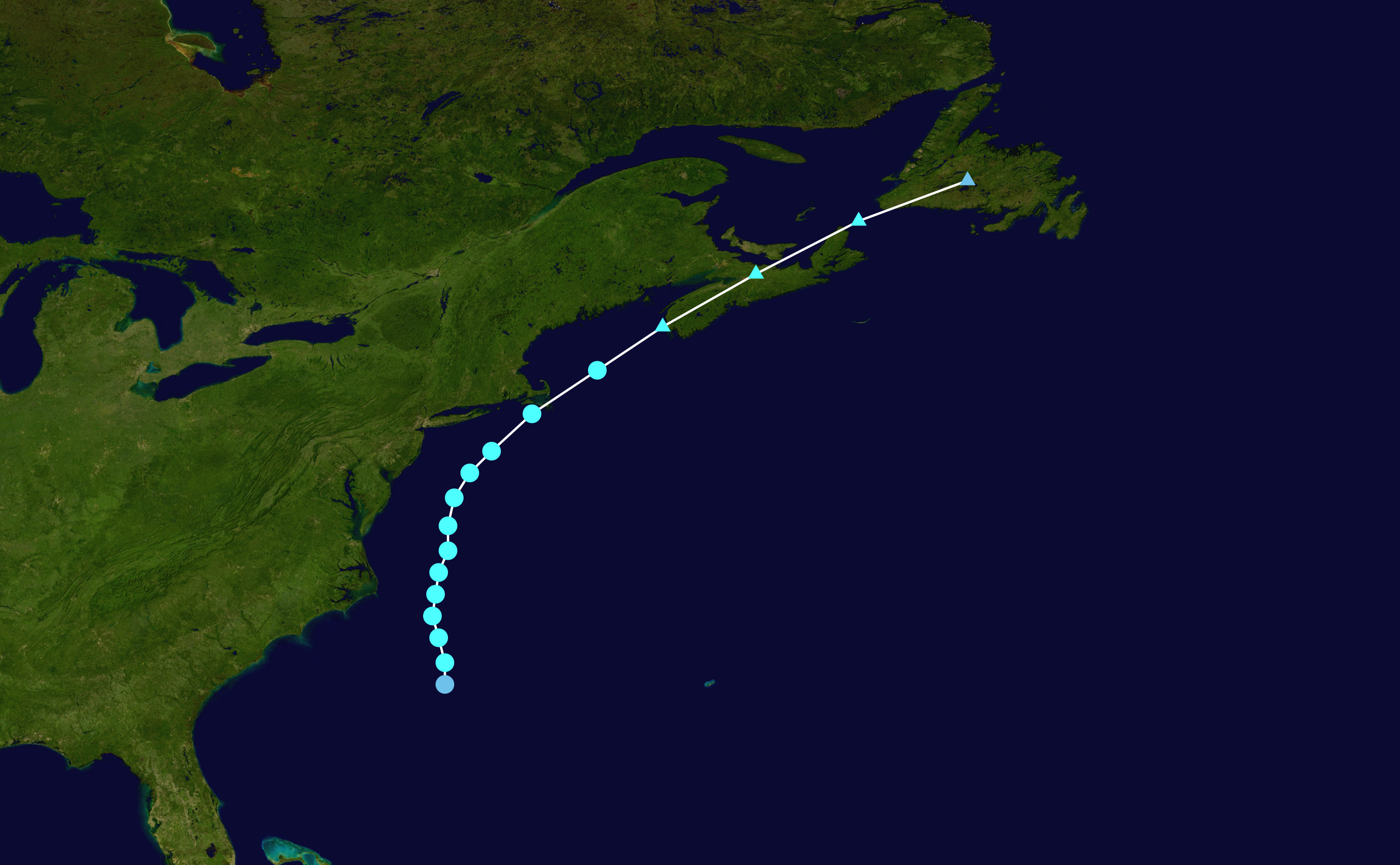
- Duration: July 18 – July 21
- Peak intensity: 60 mph (95 km/h) (1-min); 1000 mbar (hPa)

The same frontal system that developed the previous storm also produced another low-pressure area east of North Carolina. The system was broad and ill-defined at first, although the low-level circulation became sufficiently organized to be designated a tropical depression on July 18, about 290 mi (465 km) east-southeast of the coast of North Carolina. Later that day, the depression developed organized rainbands over the eastern periphery of the circulation, and as a result, the NHC upgraded it to Tropical Storm Beryl. The nascent storm moved generally northward at first along the western periphery of a subtropical ridge, parallel to the East Coast of the United States. With low wind shear and favorable outflow, Beryl intensified to reach a peak intensity of 60 mph (97 km/h) early on July 20. Around that time, the storm developed an eye-like feature in the center of the convection. Cooler waters caused Beryl to weaken, as it turned northeastward ahead of an approaching trough. Early on July 21, the storm struck the island of Nantucket with winds of 50 mph (85 km/h). Shortly thereafter, Beryl transitioned into an extratropical cyclone, which moved through Nova Scotia before merging with another extratropical cyclone on July 22 over Newfoundland.

Due to the storm's path near the eastern United States, the NHC issued several tropical cyclone watches and warnings, while the Canadian Hurricane Centre issued gale warnings for the coastal waters off Nova Scotia and Newfoundland. Ferry service between Nantucket and Cape Cod was halted during the storm. Waves along the southern coast of Nantucket reached 10 feet (3.0 m) in height as the storm approached the island, resulting in four people being rescued by lifeguards from rip currents. Light rainfall, reaching 0.97 inches (25 mm), was recorded on Nantucket, and wind gusts reached 44 mph (71 km/h). Impacts in the area were limited to downed telephone poles and fallen tree branches. The remnants of Tropical Storm Beryl dropped moderate precipitation in Atlantic Canada, with totals of up to 3.5 inches (89 mm); in some locations 1 inch (25 mm) of rain fell in an hour. Moderate winds were reported along its path, which peaked at 60 mph (97 km/h) in southern Nova Scotia. The storm caused minor street flooding and power outages across Atlantic Canada.

=== Tropical Storm Chris ===
- Tropical storm (SSHWS)
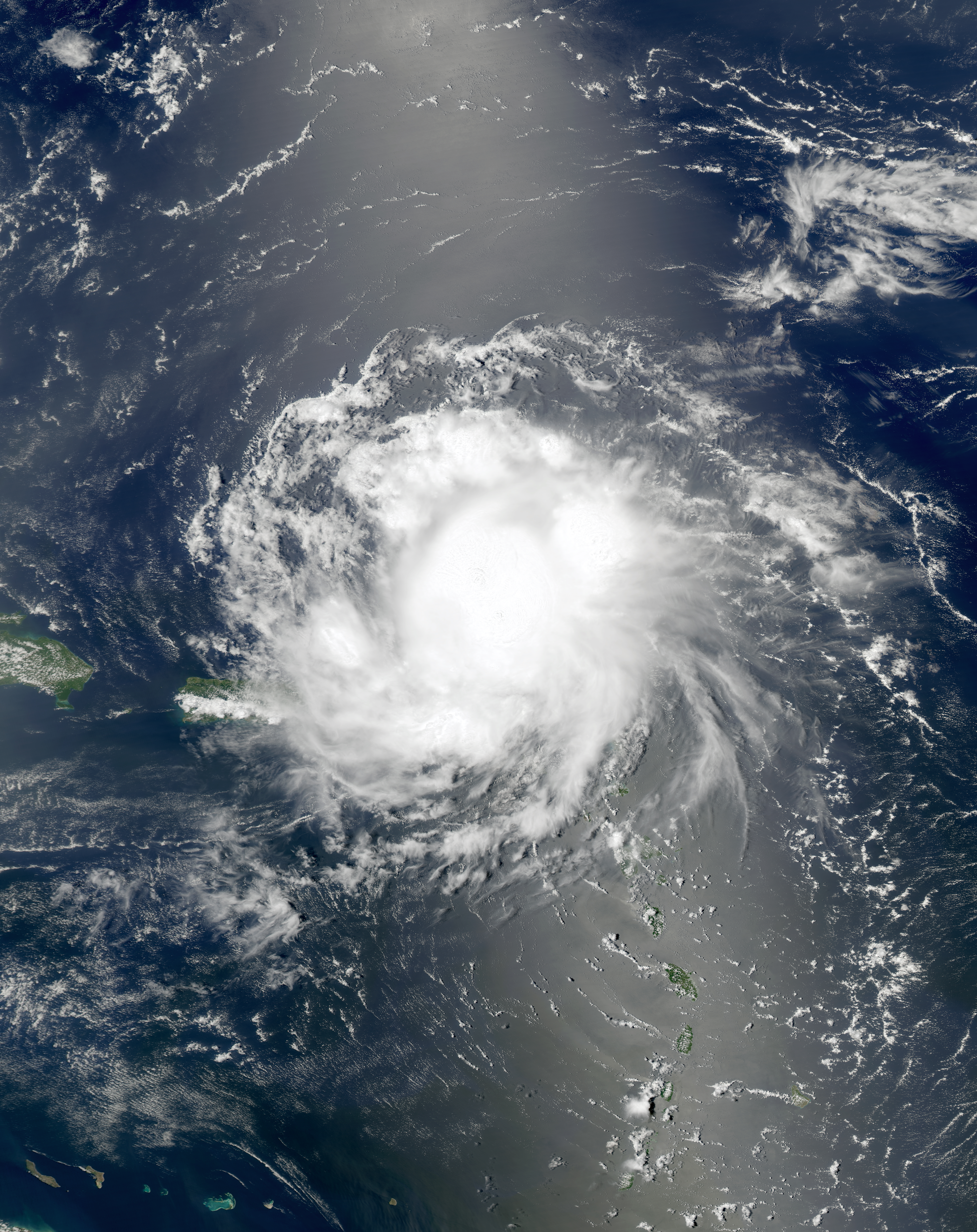
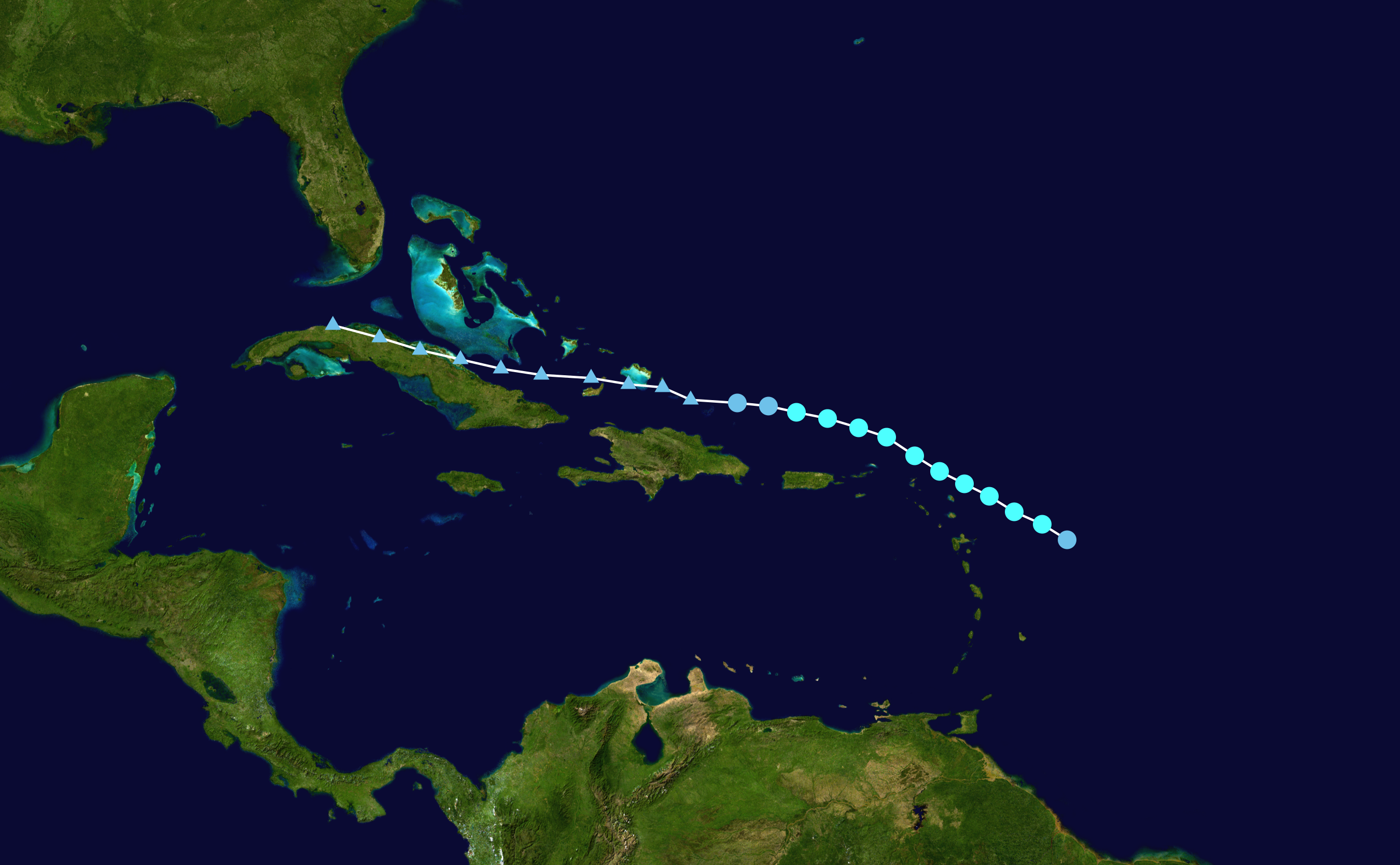
- Duration: August 1 – August 4
- Peak intensity: 65 mph (100 km/h) (1-min); 1001 mbar (hPa)

In late July, a tropical wave moved off the coast of Africa and traversed the Atlantic Ocean. The associated convection organized and became a tropical depression on August 1 about 160 miles (260 km) east of Antigua. The depression tracked westward and soon intensified into Tropical Storm Chris before reaching peak winds of 65 mph (105 km/h) northeast of the United States Virgin Islands. The storm was forecast to strengthen further and become a hurricane as it moved into the Bahamas. However, Chris began to be affected by wind shear and became disorganized. The storm weakened to a tropical depression on August 4, and dissipated as it approached the Cuban coast on August 5.

The storm's effects were limited to moderate rainfall in Hispaniola and Cuba. Cruise lines such as Royal Caribbean re-routed their ships to avoid the storm. The storm dropped light rainfall in Puerto Rico, peaking at 3.09 inches (78 mm) in Fajardo. The rainfall from the storm caused the Fajardo River to overflow its banks, which temporarily closed a highway in the northeastern portion of the island.Rainfall reached up to 2 inches (50 mm) across portions of Hispaniola, the Turks and Caicos, the Bahamas, and eastern Cuba, and reached 4 inches (100 mm) in some mountainous areas. In Santo Domingo in the Dominican Republic, heavy rainfall caused severe flooding. Las Américas reported 5.01 inches (127 mm) of rainfall from Chris. Several people were left temporarily homeless due to flooding entering their households. The flooding left many roads impassable near the capital city, and also resulted in landslides. The flooding also covered rice fields in the northeastern portion of the country. The National Office of Meteorology issued flood warnings for residents in low-lying areas and near rivers in the northeast and southeast portions of the country. Overall damage was minor.

=== Tropical Storm Debby ===
- Tropical storm (SSHWS)
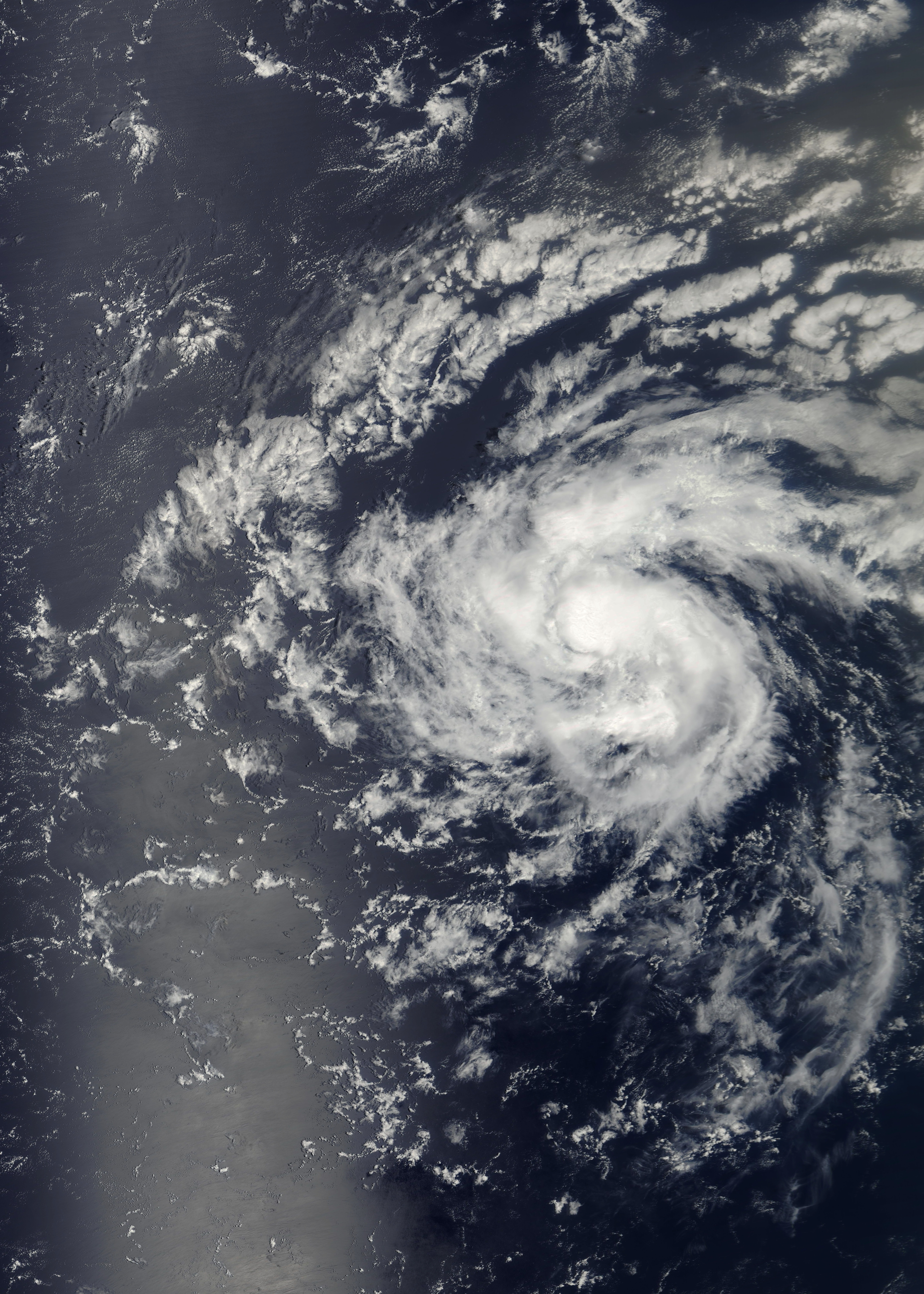
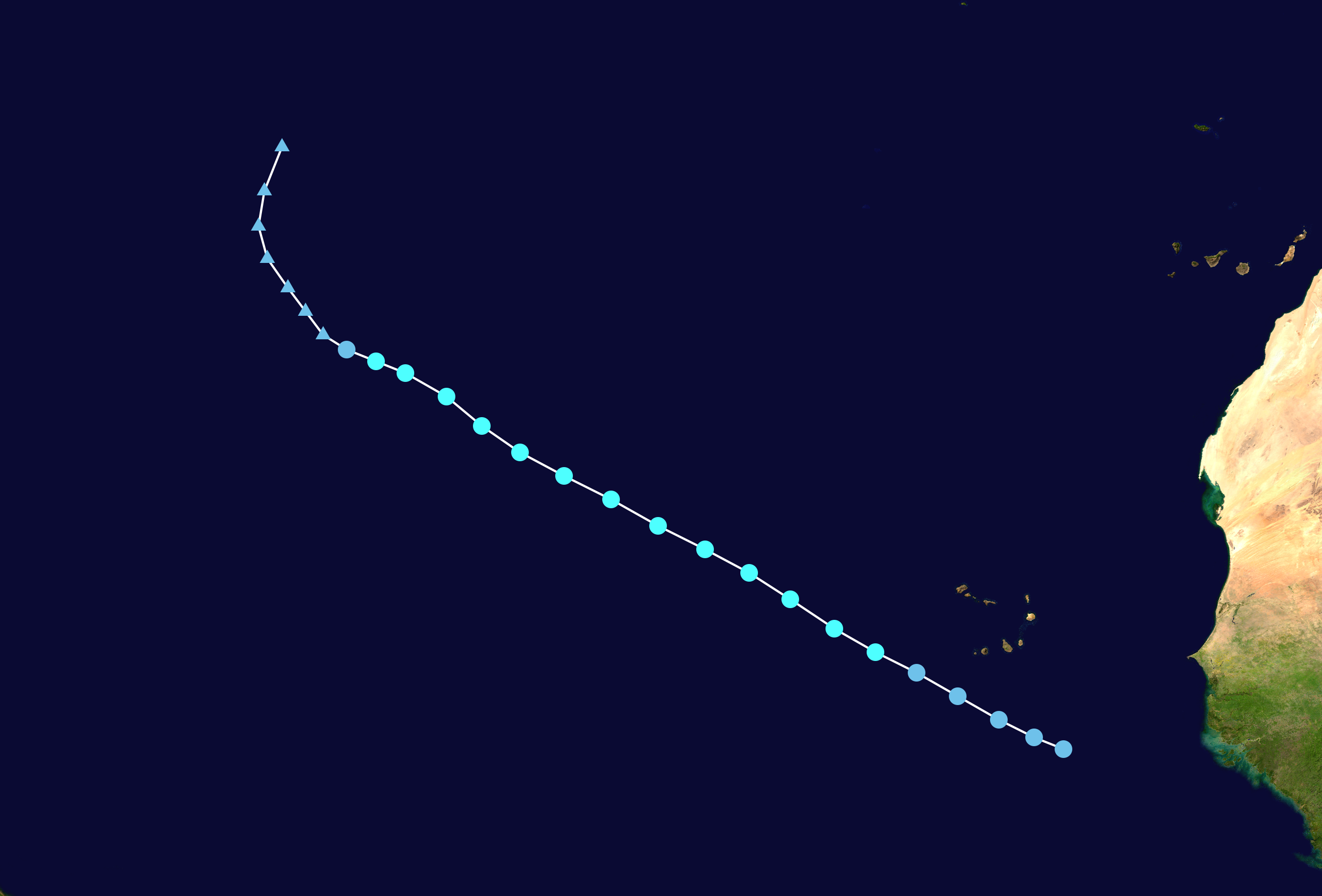
- Duration: August 21 – August 26
- Peak intensity: 50 mph (85 km/h) (1-min); 999 mbar (hPa)

On August 20, a vigorous tropical wave exited the coast of Africa, developing convective banding and a broad circulation. A broad area of low pressure formed within the wave the next day and despite convection weakening, the area of low pressure remained well-organized, becoming Tropical Depression Four later that day with water temperatures and minimal upper-level shear conducive for further intensification. The next day, the depression intensified into Tropical Storm Debby about 300 mi (485 km) southwest of Cape Verde. Debby strengthened further, peaking with sustained winds of 50 mph (80 km/h) later that day. However, shortly after reaching its peak intensity, Debby encountered dry air and subsequently weakened with its low level circulation detaching from the weakening system which was tracking west-northwestward. Convection redeveloped over a portion of the center, while banding features redeveloped as well. Organization continued, and Debby once again peaked with 50 mph (80 km/h) the next day. Soon after, southerly wind shear displaced the convection to the north of the center, causing Debby to weaken into a tropical depression the next day. Soon after, Debby degenerated into a remnant low. The remnants of Debby persisted before dissipating on August 28.

When Debby was first warned on, the government of Cape Verde issued a tropical storm warning. The National Hurricane Center stated that heavy rainfall, potentially as high as 10 in (250 mm) in mountainous areas, was possible. However, all warnings were discontinued six hours later, the depression moved away from the islands. Despite that, the depression produced a gust of 35 mph (55 km/h) at Fogo and some rainfall. Despite Debby being forecast to remain far away from the Gulf of Mexico, investors tracking the storm caused the price of crude oil to rise significantly due to its potential impact to oil installations.

=== Hurricane Ernesto ===
- Category 1 hurricane (SSHWS)
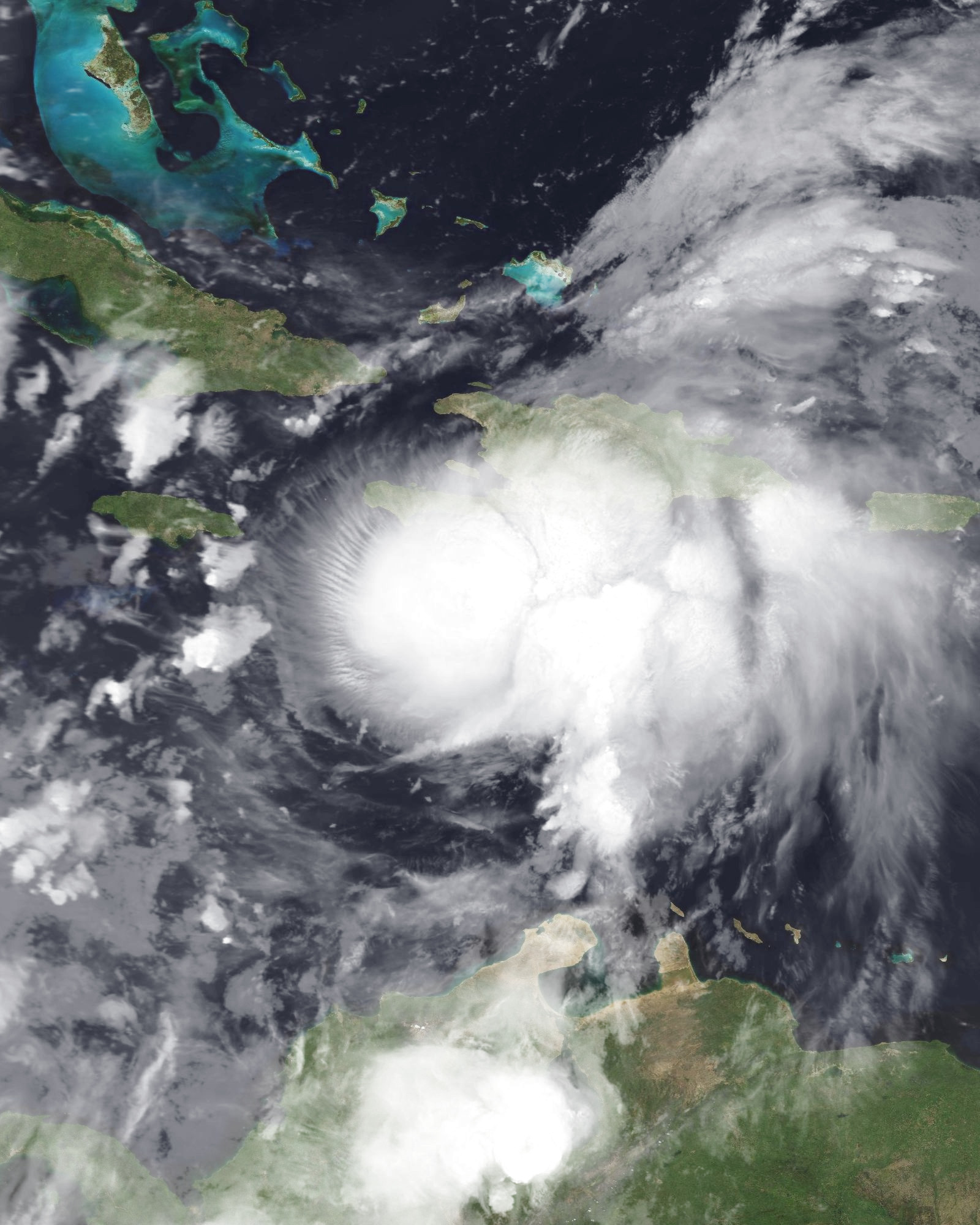
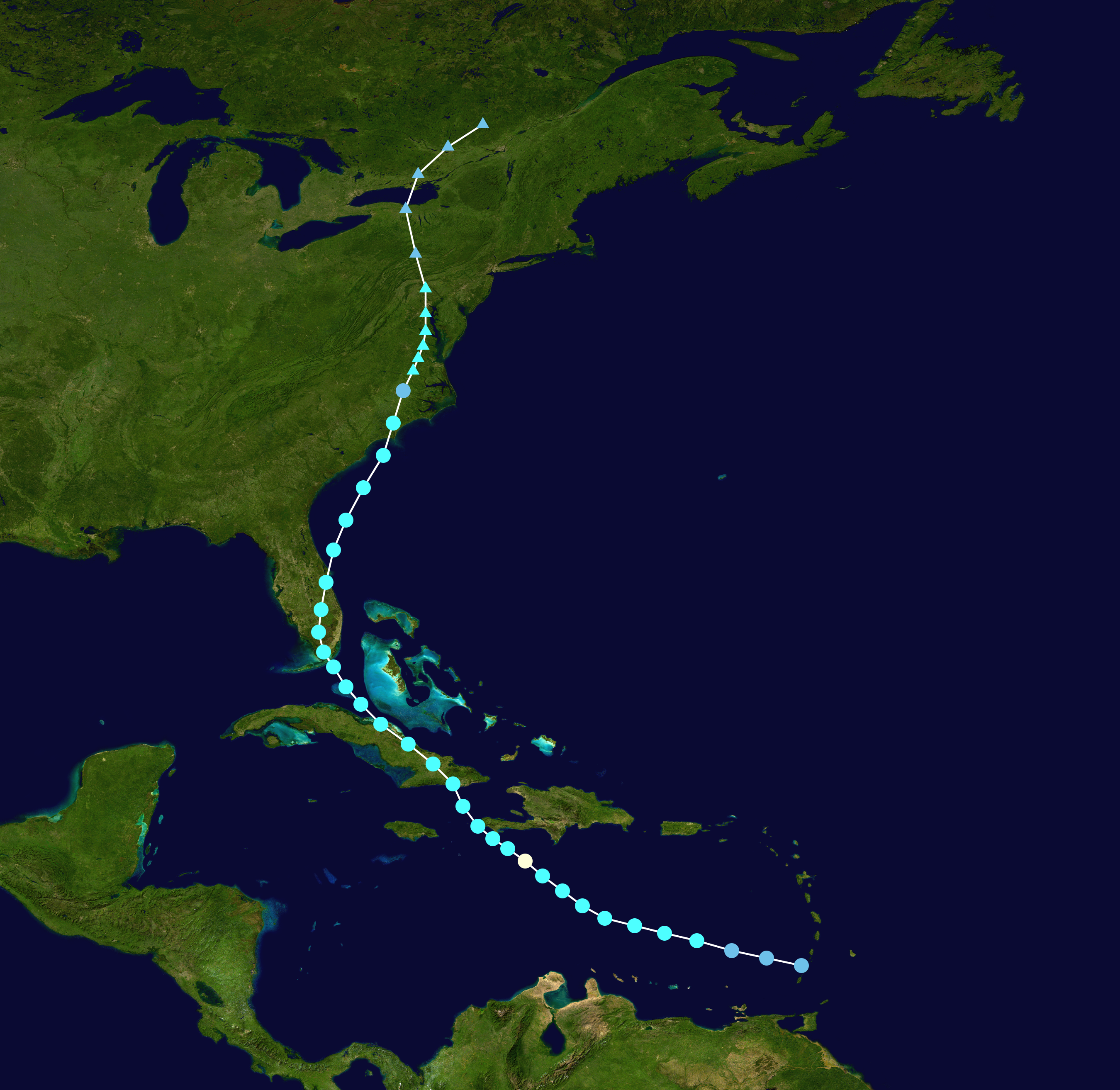
- Duration: August 24 – September 1
- Peak intensity: 75 mph (120 km/h) (1-min); 985 mbar (hPa)

Hurricane Ernesto originated from a tropical wave which moved off the coast of Africa on August 18. The wave progressed westward and reached the Western Atlantic, spawning a tropical depression on August 24 near the Windward Islands. It moved west-northwestward through the Caribbean Sea and intensified into Tropical Storm Ernesto on August 25. The storm briefly attained hurricane status on August 27 to the southwest of Haiti, before land interaction caused weakening. Ernesto made landfall near Guantánamo Bay, Cuba, early in the morning on August 28 as a tropical storm. At one point the storm was predicted to become a major hurricane in the Gulf of Mexico and threaten parts of the Gulf Coast. However, Ernesto moved much farther east than anticipated, and made landfall as a tropical storm on the southern tip of Florida on August 29. Ernesto retained tropical storm strength as it crossed Florida and emerged from land near Cape Canaveral, and was just below hurricane strength when it made landfall again in North Carolina on August 31. Ernesto transitioned into an extratropical cyclone over Virginia on September 1, which ultimately dissipated over Quebec on September 4.

Early in its duration, Ernesto killed five people in Haiti from rainfall. Later, two people died in Florida in traffic accidents due to slick roads. Damage was heaviest in Virginia, where heavy rains left severe flooding. Damage in the United States was estimated at $500 million (2006 USD).

=== Hurricane Florence ===
- Category 1 hurricane (SSHWS)
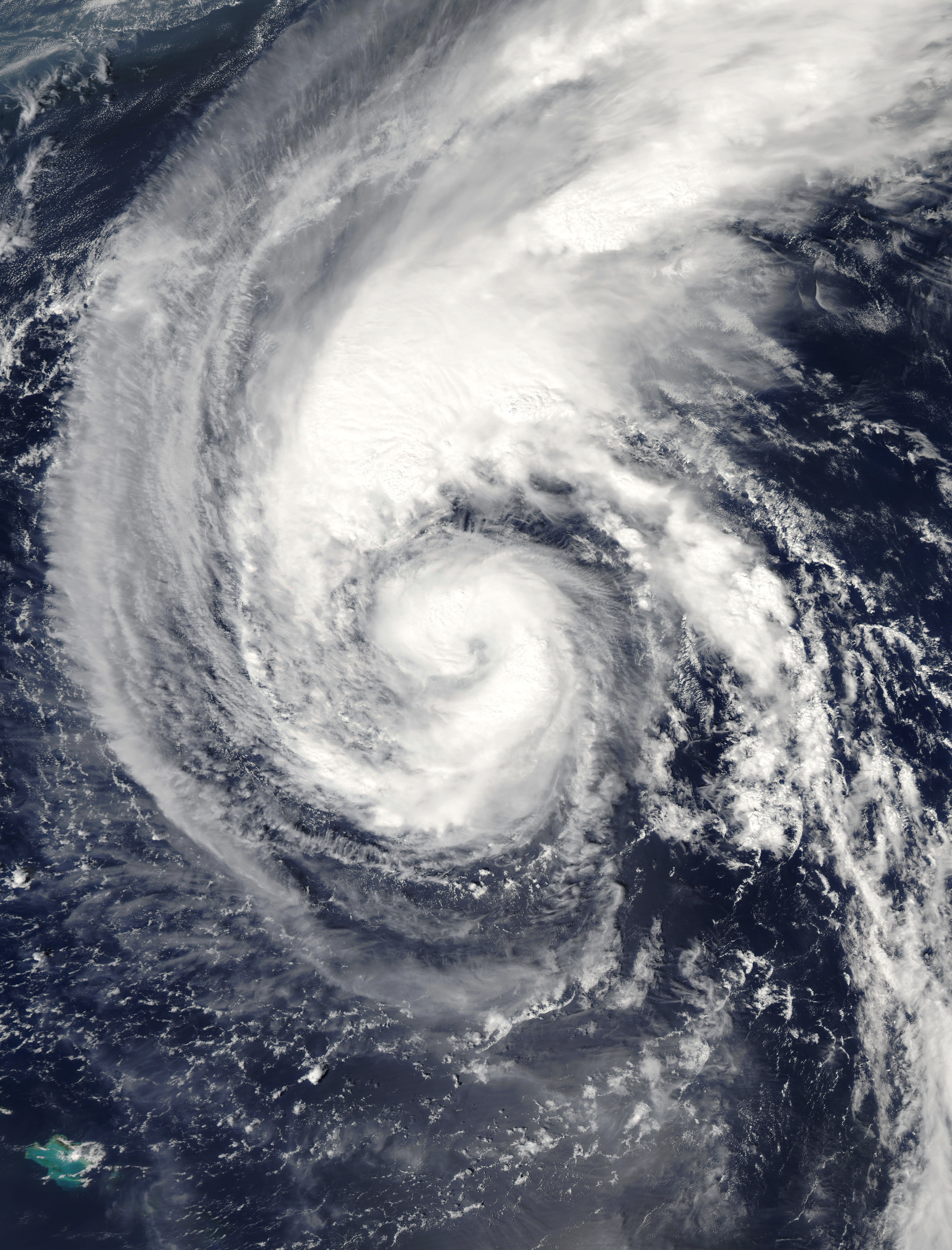
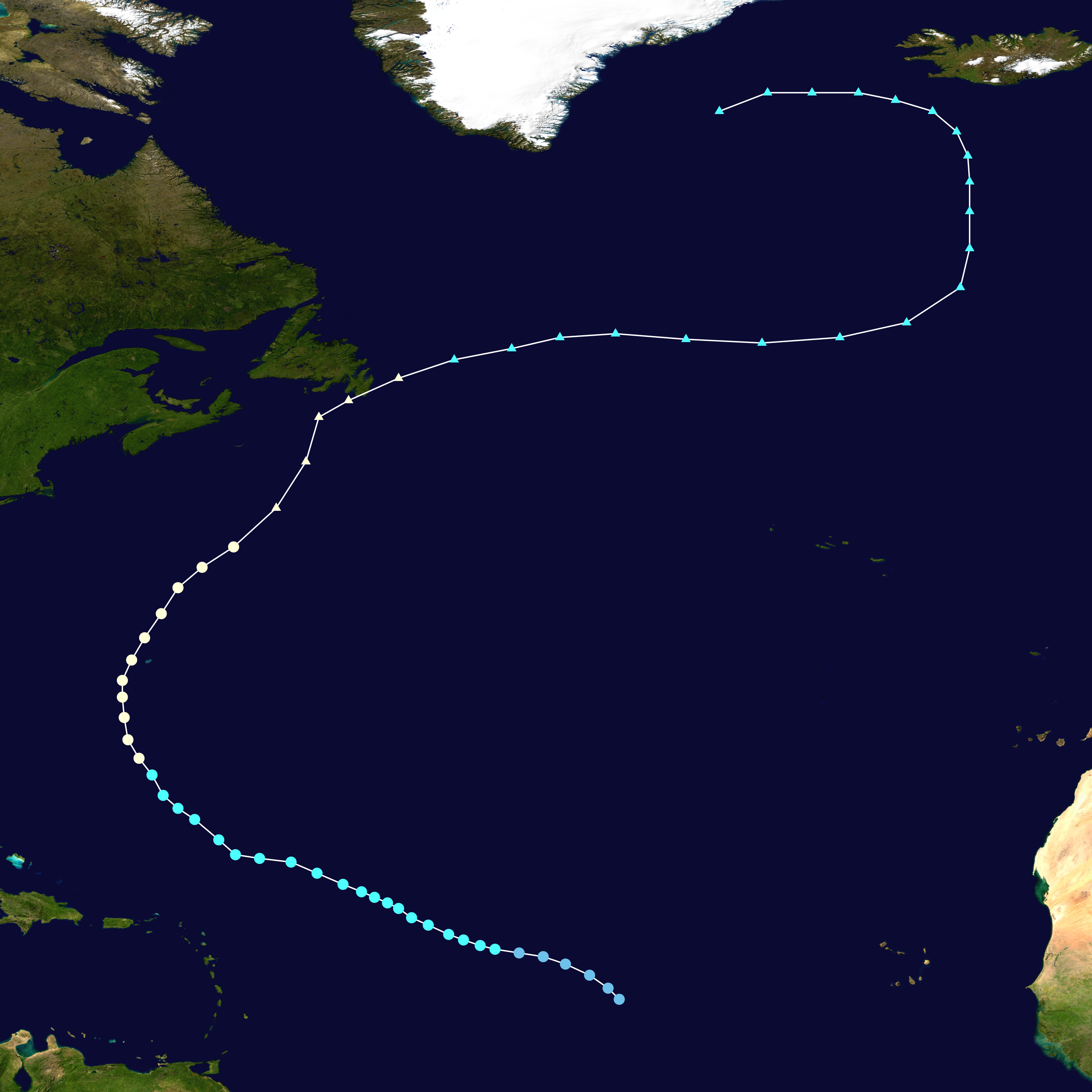
- Duration: September 3 – September 12
- Peak intensity: 90 mph (150 km/h) (1-min); 974 mbar (hPa)

Hurricane Florence originated on September 3 from the complex merging of two tropical waves, creating one large low-pressure area. The disturbance moved westward and became a tropical depression in the open waters of the Atlantic. On September 5, it organized further and was upgraded into Tropical Storm Florence. With a disorganized structure and multiple circulation centers, Florence remained a weak tropical storm for several days, even after external conditions became favorable for strengthening. Florence tracked west-northwest and intensified into a hurricane on September 10 while south of Bermuda. The storm passed just to the east of Bermuda as a Category 1 hurricane on the Saffir–Simpson scale as it reached its peak intensity of 90 mph (140 km/h). It moved north before losing its tropical characteristics and passing over the Canadian Maritimes as a strong extratropical storm.

Large swells, rip tide, and undertow were reported on Bermuda, the Leeward Islands, the Virgin Islands, and Hispaniola. Florence affected Bermuda with wind gusts up to 115 mph (185 km/h) and heavy rain which left 23,000 houses without electricity. In all, the storm caused $200,000 (2006 USD; $319,412 2026 USD) in damage. Florence then brought heavy rains across Newfoundland as an extratropical storm, destroying one house and causing minor damage to several others. There were no fatalities as a result of the hurricane.

=== Hurricane Gordon ===
- Category 3 hurricane (SSHWS)
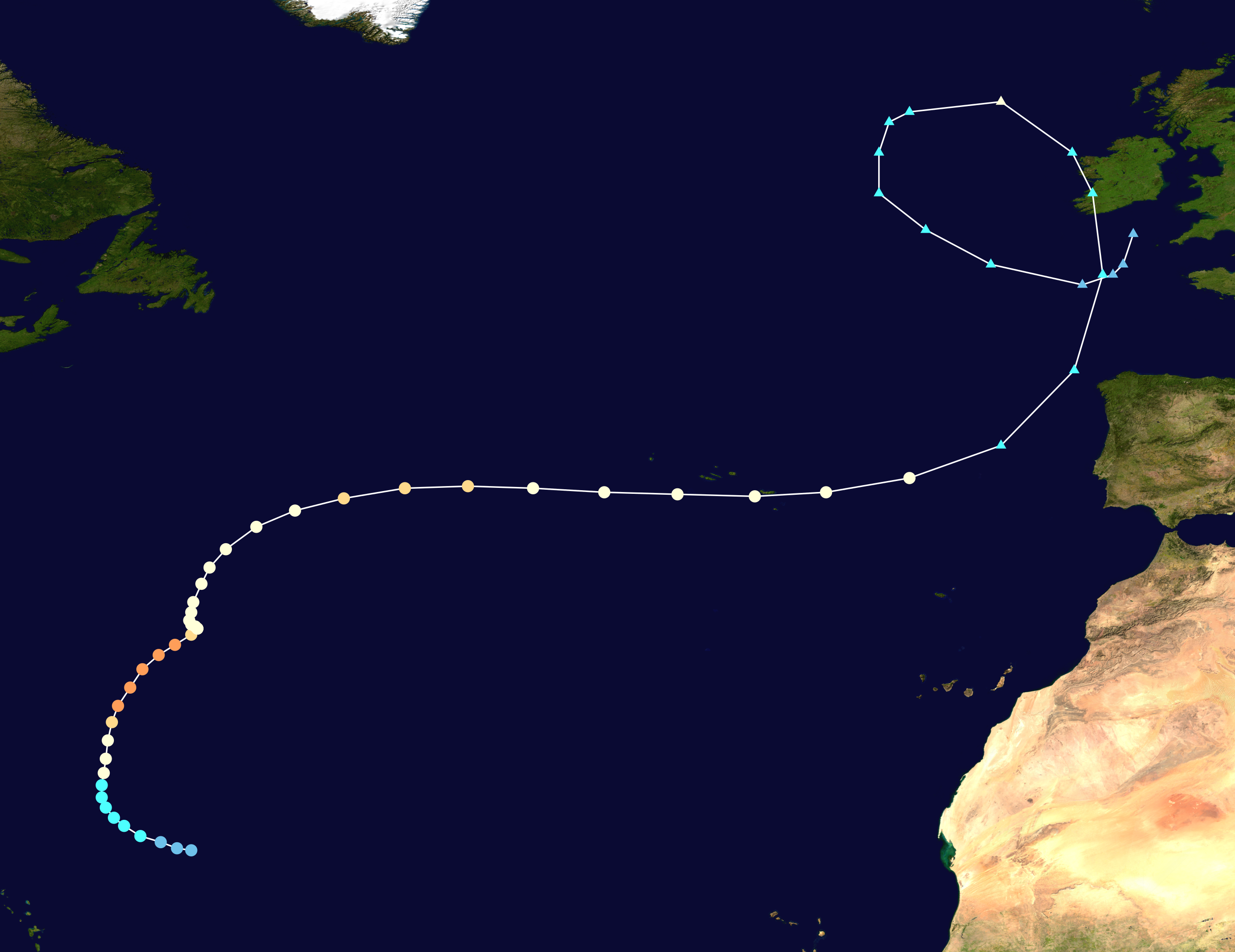
- Duration: September 10 – September 20
- Peak intensity: 120 mph (195 km/h) (1-min); 955 mbar (hPa)

A tropical wave moved off the coast of Africa on September 1. The wave tracked westward across the Atlantic for several days until it reached an area of relaxed wind shear and its associated low-pressure area organized into a tropical depression. It moved east-northeast and was upgraded to Tropical Storm Gordon on September 11, while located over the open waters of the Atlantic. Gordon turned north, and became a hurricane on September 13. It intensified to Category 3 status on the Saffir–Simpson scale and reached its peak intensity of 120 mph (190 km/h) on September 14. Tracking northward, it began to lose tropical characteristics. On September 20, the system affected Britain with high winds and heavy rain as an extratropical cyclone. During Gordon's passage through Britain, 120,000 homes were left without power after winds of 80 mph (130 km/h) affected the country.

=== Hurricane Helene ===
- Category 3 hurricane (SSHWS)
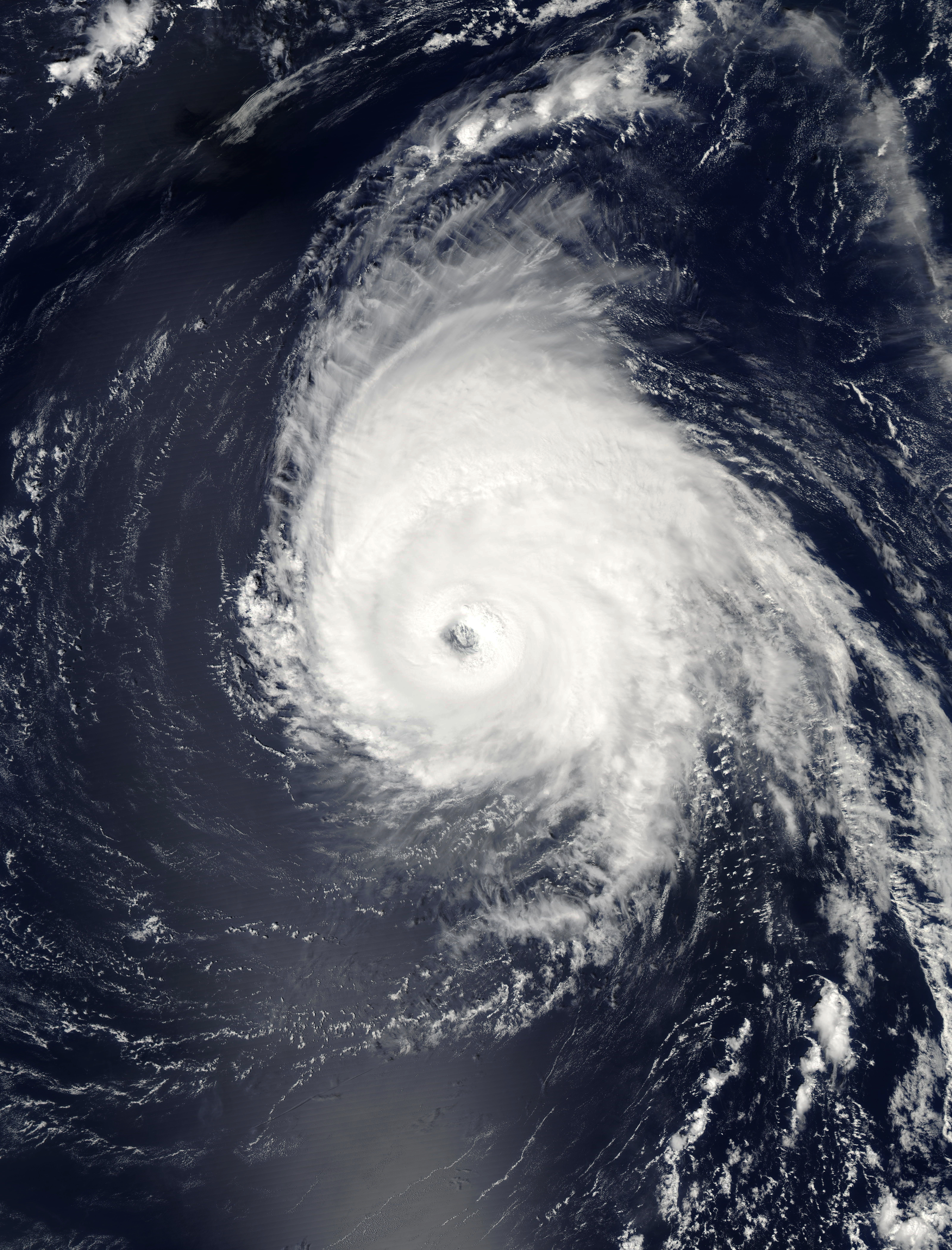
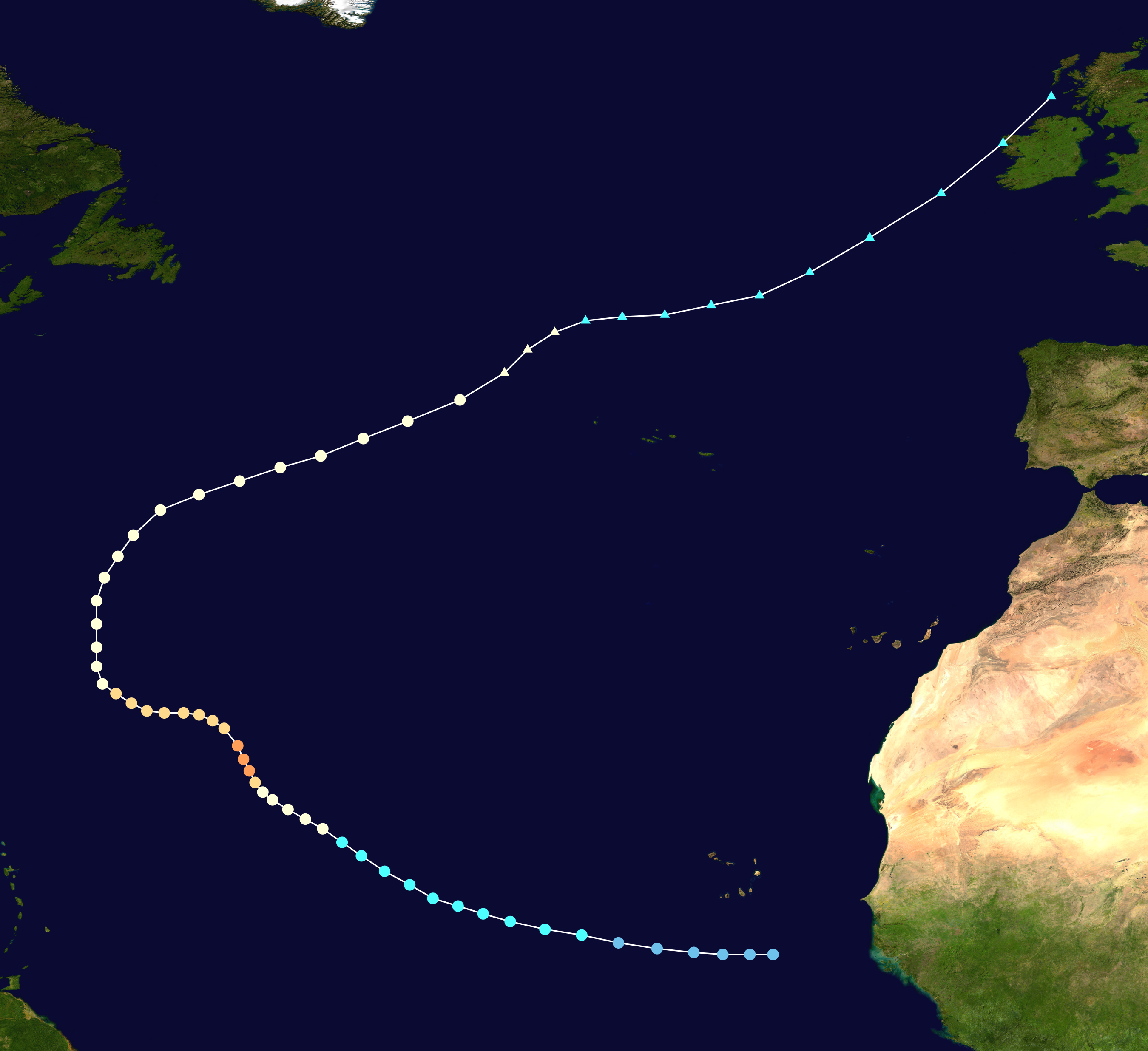
- Duration: September 12 – September 24
- Peak intensity: 120 mph (195 km/h) (1-min); 955 mbar (hPa)

On September 11, a vigorous tropical wave moved off the west coast of Africa, which the NHC expected would develop into a tropical cyclone. The convection increased and organized further, leading to the development of a tropical depression on September 12, located 270 mi (370 km) south-southeast of the Cape Verde Islands. While passing south of the islands, the depression struggled to intensify due to easterly wind shear and the cyclone's large size. Improved rainbands developed over the northern periphery, signaling that the depression intensified into Tropical Storm Helene on September 14. A day later, as wind shear decreased, Helene began intensifying, reaching hurricane intensity on September 16, as it developed a ragged eye in the center of the convection. On September 17, the intensification became more rapid and Helene quickly became a Category 2 hurricane that morning as the eye became clearer and surrounded by deep convection. Helene also turned more northward and slowed in the central Atlantic, which was in response to a weakness in the subtropical ridge farther north created by Gordon to the north. Early on September 18, Helene peaked as a Category 3 hurricane with winds of 120 mph (190 km/h).

At the time of peak intensity, Helene and Gordon were at roughly the same longitude in the open ocean, although the latter moved eastward. This caused a ridge to move southward, forcing Helene westward. Helene weakened slightly due to a lengthy eyewall replacement cycle and an elongated cloud pattern. Further weakening occurred on September 20 as wind shear increased. A day later, Helene turned back to the north and later northeast ahead of a trough that exited the east coast of the United States. The hurricane re-intensified slightly on September 23, although the structure resembled a hybrid cyclone at that time, with an asymmetric frontal-like appearance. Helene remained a warm-core cyclone until September 24, when it transitioned into an extratropical cyclone northwest of the Azores. Continuing northeast, the cyclone passed near Iceland on September 27. Later that day, the remnants of Helene merged with another larger extratropical cyclone north of the British Isles.

Helene produced high surf along the east coast of the United States. As a weakened extratropical system, strong wind gusts were reported in Ireland and northern Scotland. The strongest reported wind gust in Ireland was at the Valentia Observatory, where 56 mph (90 km/h) gusts were reported. In Scotland, the strongest gust was on South Uist Island in the Outer Hebrides, where 74 mph (119 km/h) gusts were reported.

=== Hurricane Isaac ===
- Category 1 hurricane (SSHWS)
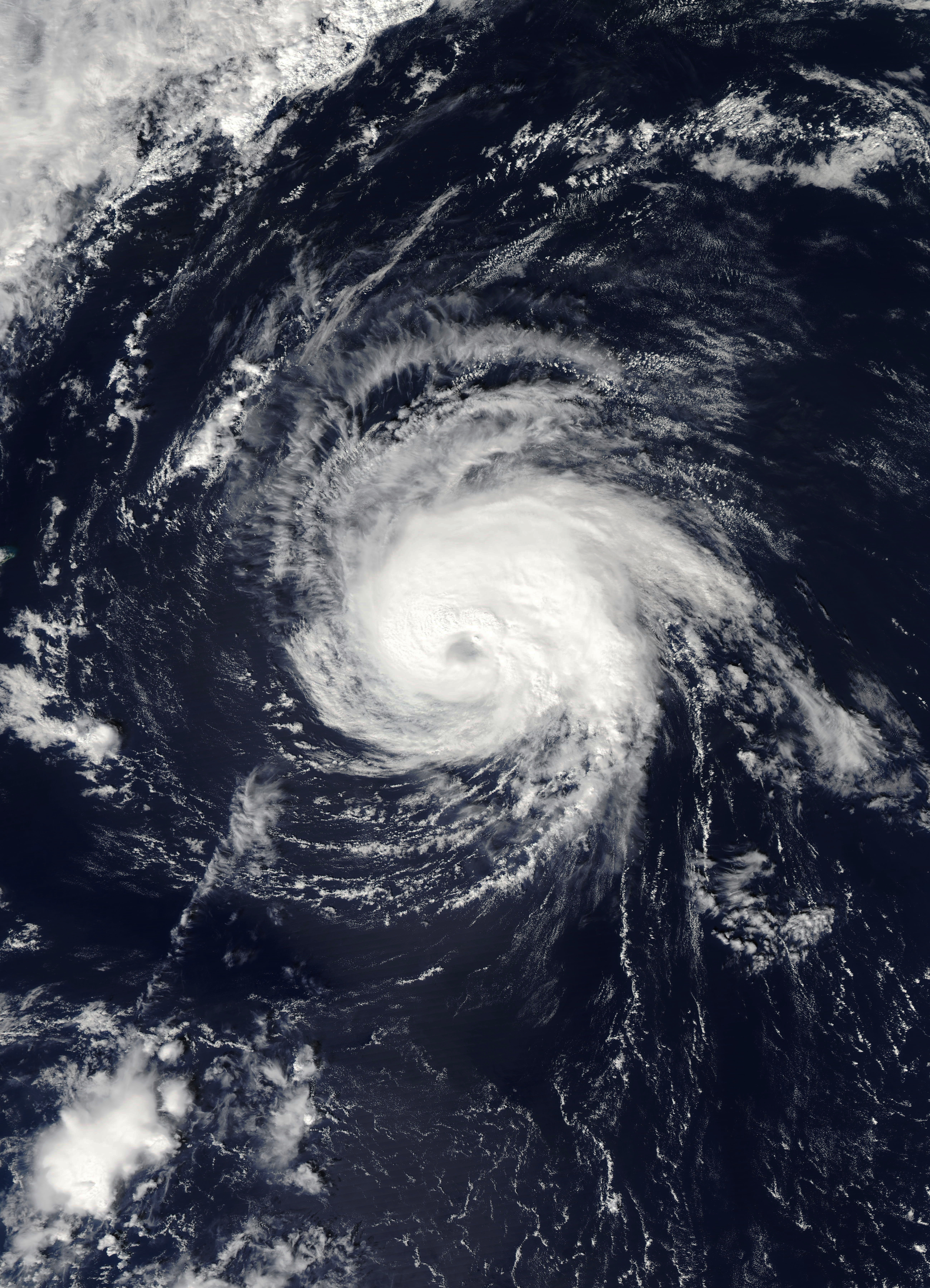
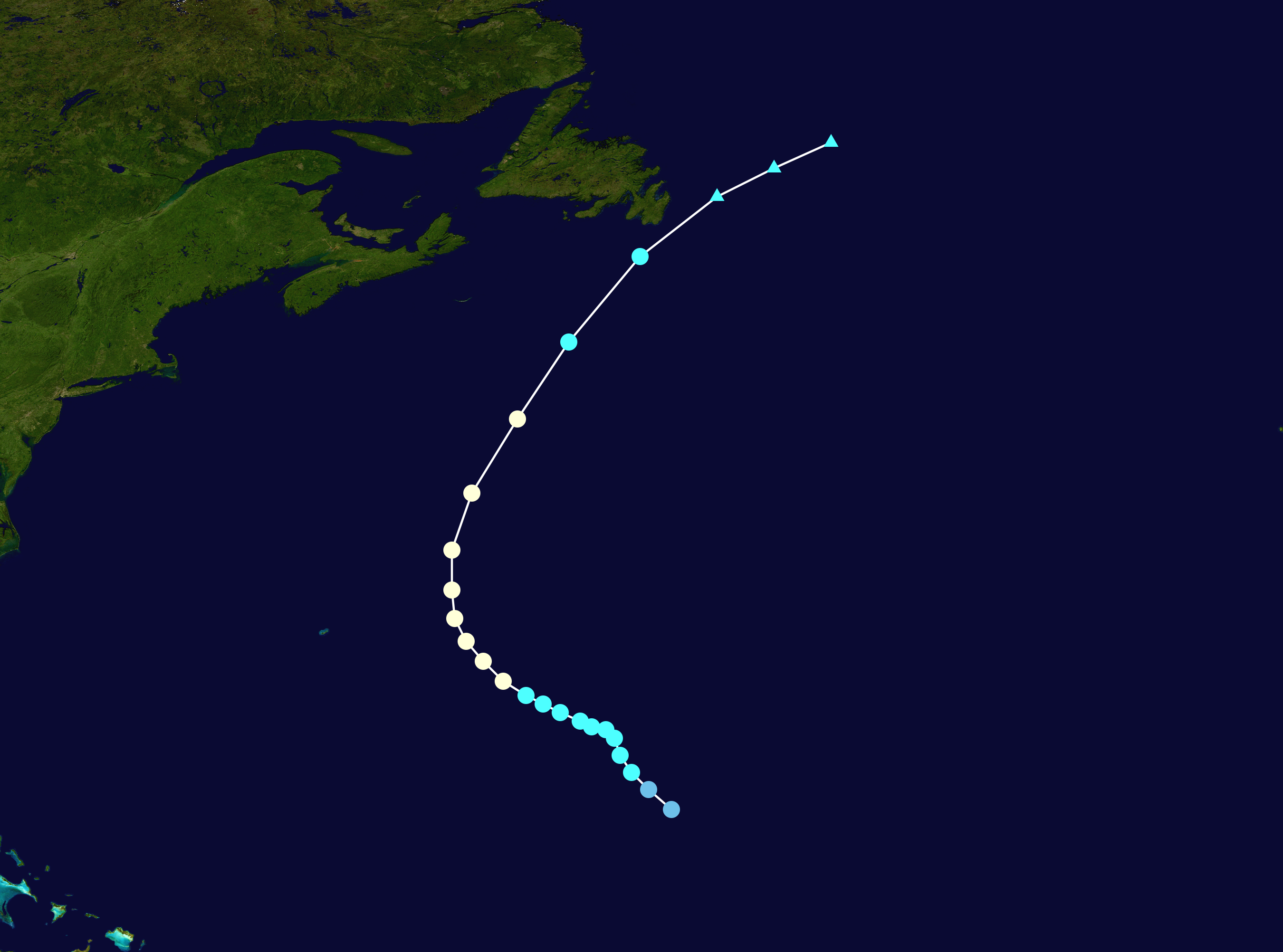
- Duration: September 27 – October 2
- Peak intensity: 85 mph (140 km/h) (1-min); 985 mbar (hPa)

A tropical wave exited the west coast of Africa on September 18. For several days, the system moved across the Atlantic, producing occasional pulses of convection. Wind shear limited development, until relaxing enough for a tropical depression to develop on September 27, located about 930 mi (1,500 km) southeast of Bermuda. On the next day, the depression intensified into Tropical Storm Isaac. Initially, the storm was tracking towards the northwest, between another low pressure system to its west and a low- to mid-level ridge to its east. Throughout the day, thunderstorm activity remained unstable, possibly as a result of cooler waters churned up by previous storms. In addition, mid- to upper-level dry air had become entrained into the circulation, and the storm contained some subtropical characteristics with a baroclinic-type cloud pattern. Slow intensification continued, and ISaac attained hurricane status on September 30. Early the next day, Isaac reached peak winds of 85 mph (140 km/h). Around that time, a ragged eye feature appeared on satellite imagery.

After reaching peak intensity, Isaac curved the periphery of the subtropical ridge, turning to the north-northeast. Stronger wind shear and cooler waters caused Isaac to weaken to a tropical storm on October 2. That day, Isaac passed about 40 mi (64 km) to the southeast of the Avalon Peninsula of Newfoundland. At Cape Race, sustained winds peaked at 46 mph (74 km/h), with gusts of up to 60 mph (97 km/h). Shortly after passing the island, Isaac transitioned into an extratropical cyclone, and on October 3 the remnants merged with a larger extratropical storm.

== Storm names ==
The following list of names was used for named storms that formed in the North Atlantic in 2006. This is the same list used for the 2000 season, except for Kirk, which replaced Keith. No names were used for the first time in 2006. No names were retired following the season for the first time since the 1997 season, and this list was used again for the 2012 season.

- Alberto
- Beryl
- Chris
- Debby
- Ernesto
- Florence
- Gordon
- Helene
- Isaac
- Joyce (unused)
- Kirk (unused)
- Leslie (unused)
- Michael (unused)
- Nadine (unused)
- Oscar (unused)
- Patty (unused)
- Rafael (unused)
- Sandy (unused)
- Tony (unused)
- Valerie (unused)
- William (unused)

== Season effects ==
This is a table of all of the storms that formed in the 2006 Atlantic hurricane season. It includes their name, duration, peak classification and intensities, areas affected, damage, and death totals. Deaths in parentheses are additional and indirect (an example of an indirect death would be a traffic accident), but were still related to that storm. Damage and deaths include totals while the storm was extratropical, a wave, or a low, and all of the damage figures are in 2006 USD.

Saffir–Simpson scale
TD	TS	C1	C2	C3	C4	C5

2006 Atlantic hurricane season statistics
Storm name	Dates active	Storm category at peak intensity	Max 1-min wind mph (km/h)	Min. press. (mbar)	Areas affected	Damage (US$)	Deaths	Ref(s).
Alberto	June 10–14	Tropical storm	70 (110)	995	Southeast United States, Atlantic Canada, Florida	$420,000	3	
Unnamed	July 17–18	Tropical storm	50 (85)	998	East Coast of the United States, Atlantic Canada	None	None	
Beryl	July 18–21	Tropical storm	60 (95)	1000	Long Island, Massachusetts, Atlantic Canada	Minimal	None	
Chris	August 1–4	Tropical storm	65 (100)	1001	Leeward Islands, Puerto Rico, Turks and Caicos Islands, Hispaniola, Bahamas, Eastern Cuba	Minimal	None	
Debby	August 21–26	Tropical storm	50 (85)	999	Cape Verde	None	None	
Ernesto	August 24 – September 1	Category 1 hurricane	75 (120)	985	Lesser Antilles, Greater Antilles, East Coast of the United States, Eastern Canada	$500 million	11	
Florence	September 3–12	Category 1 hurricane	90 (150)	974	Bermuda, Newfoundland, East Coast of the United States, Atlantic Canada, Iceland, Greenland	$200,000	None	
Gordon	September 10–20	Category 3 hurricane	120 (195)	955	Azores, Iberian Peninsula, British Isles	$3.8 million	None	
Helene	September 12–24	Category 3 hurricane	120 (195)	955	British Isles	None	None	
Isaac	September 27 – October 2	Category 1 hurricane	85 (140)	985	Newfoundland	Minimal	None	
Season aggregates
10 systems	June 10 – October 2		120 (190)	955		$504.42 million	7 (7)	

== See also ==
- Tropical cyclones in 2006
- 2006 Pacific hurricane season
- 2006 Pacific typhoon season
- 2006 North Indian Ocean cyclone season
- South-West Indian Ocean cyclone seasons: 2005–06, 2006–07
- Australian region cyclone seasons: 2005–06, 2006–07
- South Pacific cyclone seasons: 2005–06, 2006–07
- South Atlantic tropical cyclone
- Mediterranean tropical-like cyclone
