= Tropical Storm Grace (2009) =

Atlantic tropical storm in 2009

- Tropical Storm Grace at peak intensity on 5 October

Meteorological history
- Formed: 4 October 2009
- Extratropical: 6 October 2009
- Dissipated: 7 October 2009

Tropical storm
- 1-minute sustained (SSHWS/NWS)
- Highest winds: 65 mph (100 km/h)
- Lowest pressure: 986 mbar (hPa); 29.12 inHg

Overall effects
- Fatalities: None reported
- Damage: Minimal
- Areas affected: Azores, Portugal, Ireland, United Kingdom
- IBTrACS
- Part of the 2009 Atlantic hurricane season

Tropical Storm Grace was a highly unusual tropical cyclone that affected parts of eastern Europe and the Azores in October 2009. The seventh named storm of the 2009 Atlantic hurricane season, Grace formed from an extratropical cyclone over the Azores on 4 October. It strengthened to attain peak sustained winds of 65 mph (100 km/h) and developed an eye-like feature, although cold sea surface temperatures inhibited the development of thunderstorm activity near the center. The storm lost its tropical characteristics on 6 October, and the storm's remnants merged with a separate system near the British Isles on 7 October. At the time, Grace was the farthest northeast forming tropical cyclone in the Atlantic basin on record.

Grace had only minor effects on land, although while it was passing through the Azores, islands close to the storm's center recorded winds of up to 44 mph (71 km/h) and moderate rainfall. Although not solely related to the cyclone, heavy rainfall in Portugal led to some street flooding. The remnants also impacted parts of Ireland and the United Kingdom, where rainfall approaching 2 in (51 mm) and tropical storm-force winds were recorded. However, no significant damage occurred.

== Meteorological history ==
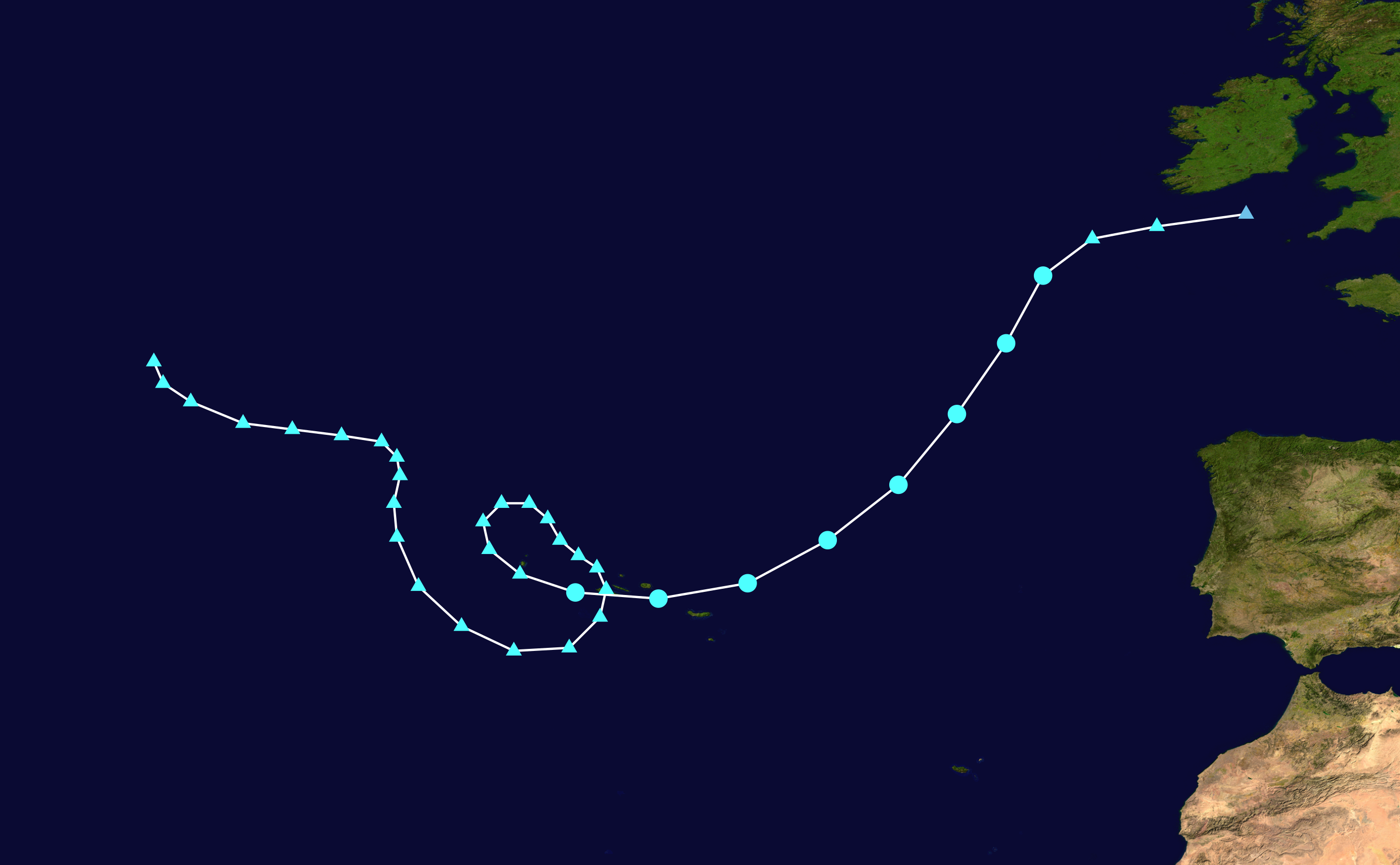
Map plotting the storm's track and intensity, according to the Saffir–Simpson scale Map key Saffir–Simpson scale Tropical depression (≤38 mph, ≤62 km/h) Tropical storm (39–73 mph, 63–118 km/h) Category 1 (74–95 mph, 119–153 km/h) Category 2 (96–110 mph, 154–177 km/h) Category 3 (111–129 mph, 178–208 km/h) Category 4 (130–156 mph, 209–251 km/h) Category 5 (≥157 mph, ≥252 km/h) Unknown Storm type Tropical cyclone Subtropical cyclone Extratropical cyclone, remnant low, tropical disturbance, or monsoon depression

Tropical Storm Grace originated from a large extratropical cyclone that formed along a cold front on 27 September, roughly 470 mi (755 km) east of Cape Race, Newfoundland. Initially attached to an occluded front, the low detached from the system and gradually acquired tropical characteristics. By 1 October, shower and thunderstorm activity began to develop near the center of the system as it tracked through the central Azores. However, the following day, convection began to decrease over the system, and the National Hurricane Center (NHC) ceased monitoring it. Over the following two days, the system executed a counter-clockwise loop near the Azores. During the afternoon of 4 October, convection redeveloped around the center of the low and was classified as a tropical storm near São Miguel Island. Although the storm was tropical at this time, the NHC did not issue advisories for several hours.

The first advisory from the NHC was issued at 11:00 AST on 4 October; at this time, the system was officially named Grace, the seventh named storm of the 2009 Atlantic hurricane season. The storm featured relatively deep convection around an eye-like feature. Although Grace was over waters normally not warm enough for tropical cyclogenesis, low wind shear allowed the convection to persist. A steady northeastward track was taken by the storm in response to a southerly flow over the northwestern Atlantic. The storm intensified slightly as it moved over decreasing sea surface temperatures, with winds estimated at 65 mph (100 km/h) early on 5 October; operationally it was held at 70 mph (110 km/h), but was downgraded due to uncertainties in the storm's intensity as it was progressing over cold waters.

A large extratropical cyclone near Grace caused the storm to deteriorate in organization, with convection weakening and becoming asymmetric. By this time, the storm was over 18 °C (64 °F) waters, likely inhibiting convective development. Shower and thunderstorm activity continued to diminish throughout the day on 5 October; however, Grace maintained tropical characteristics, namely a deep, warm core. Early on 6 October, the NHC issued their final advisory on Grace as it merged with a frontal system over the northeastern Atlantic. Just prior to merging, the lowest pressure in relation to the storm was recorded at 986 mbar (hPa; 29.12 inHg). The extratropical remnants of Grace persisted for roughly 18 hours before dissipating over the Celtic Sea early on 7 October. However, the United States Naval Research Laboratory continued to monitor the system for several more hours until it moved over the North Sea.

Although officially designated a tropical cyclone by the NHC, Météo-France, the French meteorological service, stated in their annual report to the World Meteorological Organization that Grace should not have been classified a tropical system. In their report, they argued that although the storm presented deep convection, an eye-like feature, and winds above 60 mph (95 km/h), the overall development of Grace was more similar to that of a mid-latitude non-tropical cyclone. However, operationally, Météo-France considered Grace to be a subtropical cyclone. They also criticized the NHC for warning on this system based on recent trends of the link between global warming and increased hurricane activity.

== Impact and records ==
Wettest tropical cyclones and their remnants in the United Kingdom Highest-known totals
Precipitation			Storm	Location	Ref.
Rank	mm	in	Storm	Location	Ref.
1	150.0	5.91	Bertha 2014	Inverness, Highland	
2	135.0	5.31	Charley 1986	Abergwyngregyn, Gwynedd	
3	130.0	5.12	Nadine 2012	Ravensworth, North Yorkshire	
4	76.0	2.99	Lili 1996	Chale Bay, Isle of Wight	
5	61.7	2.43	Zeta 2020	Chipping, Lancashire	
6	48.8	1.92	Grace 2009	Capel Curig, Conwy	
7	42.2	1.66	Gordon 2006	Wainfleet All Saints, Lincolnshire	
8	38.0	1.50	Gonzalo 2014	Glenmoriston, Highland	
9	31.0	1.22	Bill 2009	Shap, Cumbria	
10	30.0	1.18	Laura 2008	Windermere, Cumbria	

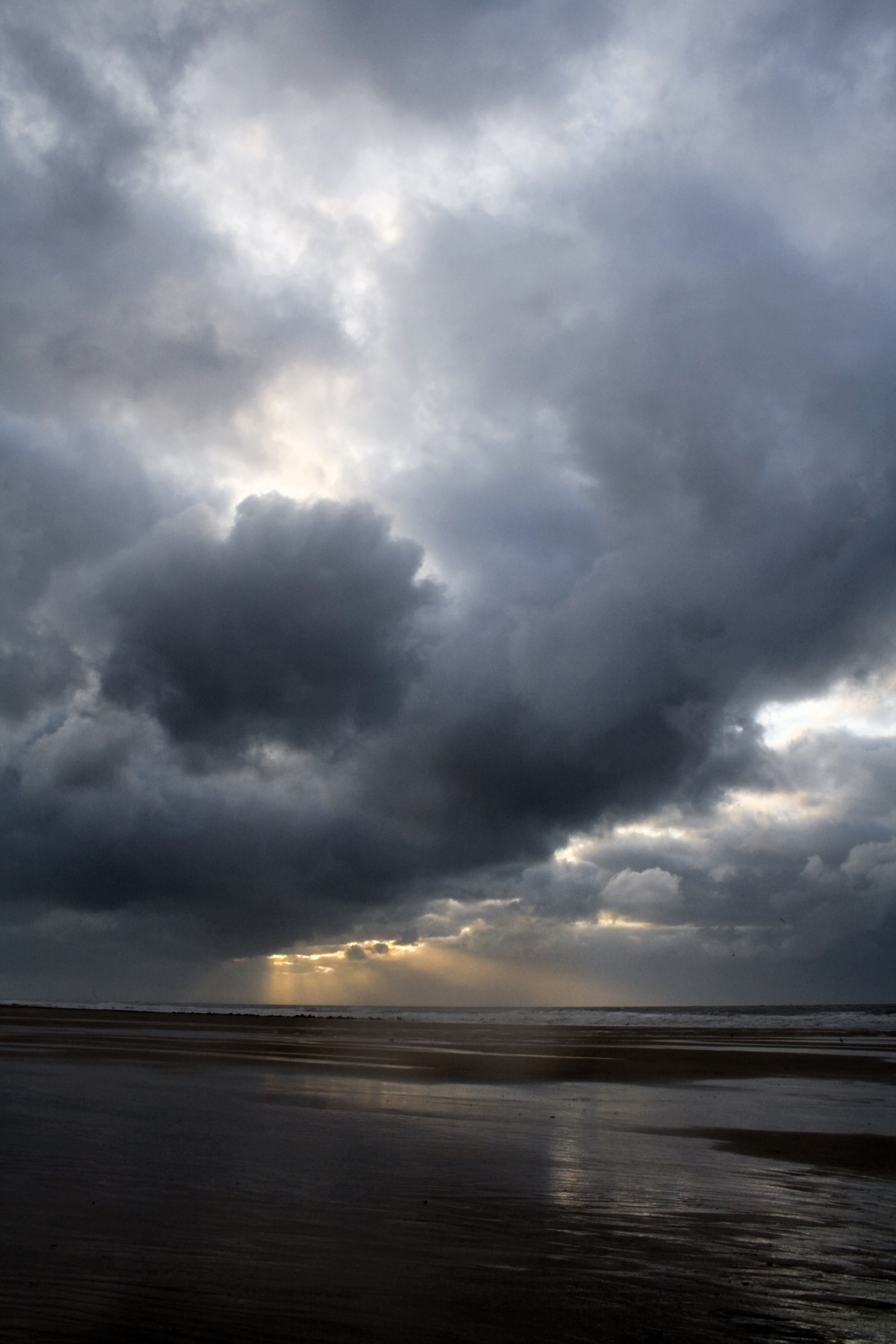
Overcast skies from the outskirts of Grace in Nijlen, Belgium

Upon being classified a tropical cyclone within the Azores, a few islands received minor rainfall and high winds. Gusts up to 44 mph (71 km/h) were recorded on Ponta Delgada. While merging with the frontal system on 6 October, the storm's outer bands produced heavy rains and strong winds over parts of Portugal, resulting in some street flooding. In higher elevations, wind gusts were estimated to have exceeded 80 km/h (50 mph).

Due to the storm's relatively rapid forward movement by the time it reached the United Kingdom, rainfall was limited. In Ireland, 1.18 in (30 mm) of precipitation fell in the city of Cork. Sustained winds in the city were recorded up to 23 mph (37 km/h). Rainfall in the country peaked at 48 mm (1.9 in) in Wexford. Near the coastline of Wales, a buoy recorded sustained winds up to 41 mph (66 km/h), equivalent to a minimal tropical storm. Late on 6 October, the remnants of Grace moved inland over Wales, bringing heavy rains and high winds to the region. Maximum rainfall in the United Kingdom reached 1.92 in (49 mm) in Capel Curig. One ship, the Cap Castillo (call sign A8PI5), recorded sustained winds of 45 mph (72 km/h) on 5 October, while located about 110 mi (180 km) south of the storm's center. Moisture from the storm's remnants fueled another, more powerful cyclone that caused flooding in parts of Belgium after producing upwards of 2.4 in (61 mm) of rain.

Operationally, Grace was not classified as a tropical storm until it reached latitude 41.2°N. However, a post-storm analysis concluded that Grace had actually become a tropical storm 12 hours earlier than initially estimated, placing its location of development further south, at 38.5°N. This marked the farthest northeast a tropical cyclone formed in the Atlantic basin, breaking the record set by Hurricane Vince in 2005.

In its Tropical Cyclone Report on Grace, the National Hurricane Center reported that the formation of Grace was poorly forecast. The first mention of the precursor low on 1 October predicted that it would not develop into a tropical or subtropical cyclone. Over the following three days, the system was not mentioned in the NHC's tropical weather outlooks until just prior to Grace's classification. The lack of preceding outlooks was attributed to the storm's unusual location and the sparsity of data for storms in the region.

== See also ==
- Other storms named Grace
- List of Azores hurricanes
- Tropical cyclone effects in Europe
