= Hurricane Nadine =

Category 1 Atlantic hurricane in 2012

- Hurricane Nadine at peak intensity on September 30

Meteorological history
- Formed: September 10, 2012
- Extratropical: October 3, 2012
- Dissipated: October 4, 2012
- Duration: 3 weeks and 3 days

Category 1 hurricane
- 1-minute sustained (SSHWS/NWS)
- Highest winds: 90 mph (150 km/h)
- Lowest pressure: 978 mbar (hPa); 28.88 inHg

Overall effects
- Fatalities: 2
- Damage: Minimal
- Areas affected: Azores, United Kingdom, Florida
- IBTrACS /
- Part of the 2012 Atlantic hurricane season

Hurricane Nadine was a very erratic Category 1 hurricane that became the fourth-longest-lived Atlantic hurricane on record. As the fourteenth tropical cyclone and named storm of the 2012 Atlantic hurricane season, Nadine developed from a tropical wave traveling west of Cape Verde on September 10. On the following day, it had strengthened into Tropical Storm Nadine. After initially tracking northwestward, Nadine turned northward, well away from any landmass. Early on September 15, Nadine reached hurricane status as it was curving eastward. Soon after, an increase in vertical wind shear weakened Nadine and by September 16 it was back to a tropical storm. On the following day, the storm began moving northeastward and threatened the Azores but late on September 19, Nadine veered east-southeastward before reaching the islands. Nonetheless, the storm produced tropical storm force winds on a few islands. On September 21, the storm curved south-southeastward while south of the Azores. Later that day, Nadine transitioned into a extratropical low pressure area.

Due to favorable conditions, the remnants of Nadine regenerated into a tropical cyclone on September 24. After re-developing, the storm executed a cyclonic loop and meandered slowly across the eastern Atlantic. Eventually, Nadine turned south-southwestward, at which time it became nearly stationary. By September 28, the storm curved northwestward and re-strengthened into a hurricane. The tenacious cyclone intensified further and peaked with winds of 90 mph (140 km/h) on September 30. By the following day, however, Nadine weakened back to a 65 mph (105 km/h) tropical storm, as conditions became increasingly unfavorable. Strong wind shear and decreasing sea surface temperatures significantly weakened the storm. Nadine transitioned into an extratropical cyclone on October 3, and merged with an approaching cold front northeast of the Azores soon after. The remnants of Nadine passed through the Azores on October 4 and again brought relatively strong winds to the islands.

== Origin and meteorological history ==
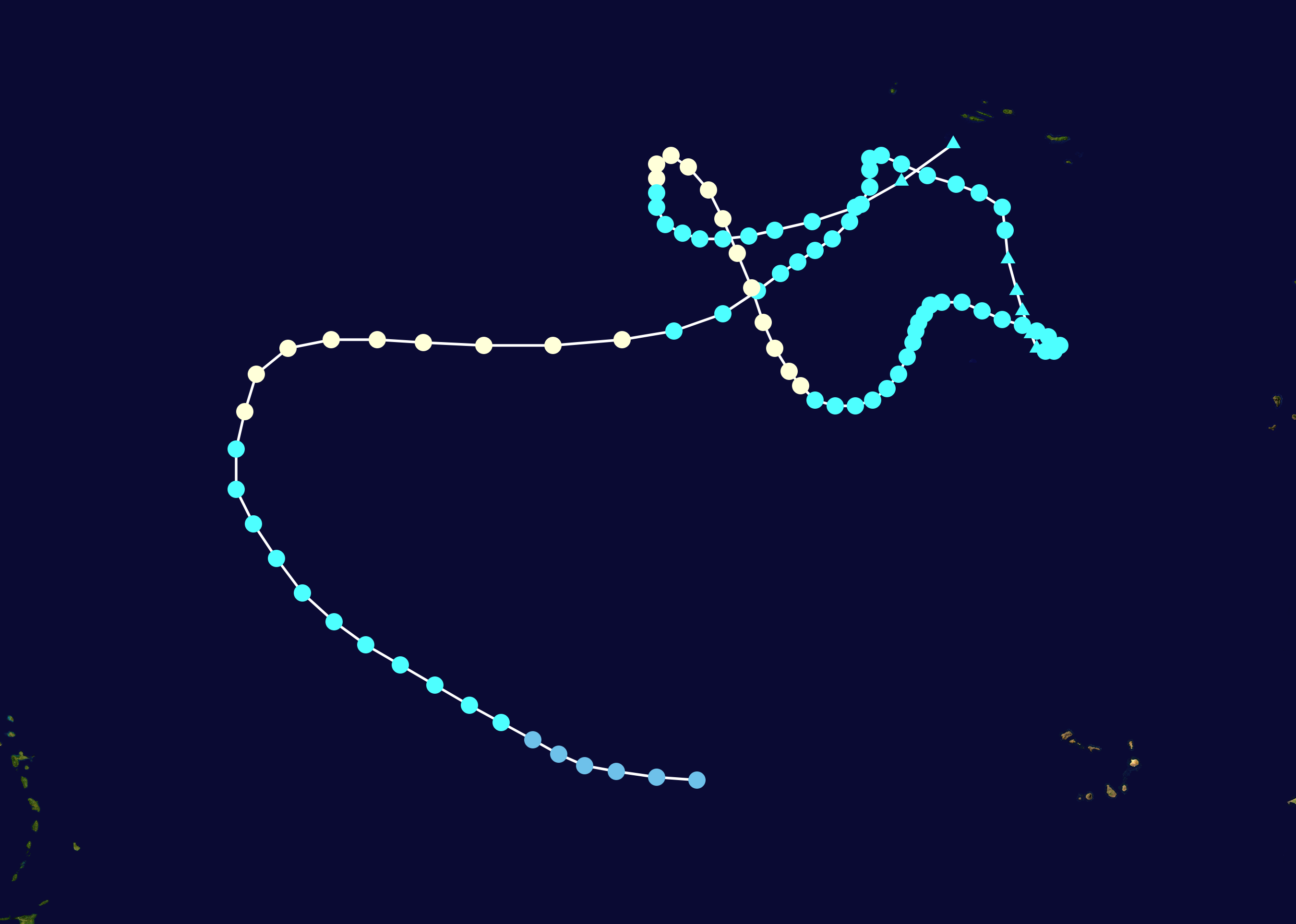
Map plotting the storm's track and intensity, according to the Saffir–Simpson scale Map key Saffir–Simpson scale Tropical depression (≤38 mph, ≤62 km/h) Tropical storm (39–73 mph, 63–118 km/h) Category 1 (74–95 mph, 119–153 km/h) Category 2 (96–110 mph, 154–177 km/h) Category 3 (111–129 mph, 178–208 km/h) Category 4 (130–156 mph, 209–251 km/h) Category 5 (≥157 mph, ≥252 km/h) Unknown Storm type Tropical cyclone Subtropical cyclone Extratropical cyclone, remnant low, tropical disturbance, or monsoon depression

A large tropical wave emerged into the Atlantic Ocean from the west coast of Africa, on September 7. The system passed south of Cape Verde on September 8, bringing disorganized showers and thunderstorms. Around that time, the National Hurricane Center gave the system a medium chance of tropical cyclogenesis within 48 hours. A low pressure area developed along the axis of the tropical wave on September 9, which further increased convective activity. The system was assessed with a high chance for tropical cyclone formation on September 10. Based on satellite intensity estimates, the National Hurricane Center declared the disturbance as Tropical Depression Fourteen at 1200 UTC on September 10, while the storm was about 885 miles (1,424 km) west of Cape Verde.

Although thunderstorm activity was initially minimal around the center of circulation, a convective band associated with the depression was becoming more organized. Late on September 10, convection began to increase slightly near the center, but because Dvorak intensity T-numbers were between 2.0 and 2.5, the depression was not upgraded to a tropical storm. However, dry air briefly caused showers and thunderstorms to decrease later that day. Initially, it headed just north of due west around the southern periphery of a large subtropical ridge. However, by September 11, the depression re-curved northwestward. Later that day, the depression began to regain deep convection. Geostationary satellite imagery and scatterometer data indicated that the depression strengthened into Tropical Storm Nadine at 0000 UTC on September 12.

== Strengthening and initial peak intensity ==
Hurricane Nadine at its initial peak intensity on September 15

By September 12, a central dense overcast developed and due to favorable conditions, the National Hurricane Center noted the possibility of rapid deepening. Intensification continued at a quicker albeit less than rapid rate on September 12. Later that day, sustained winds reached 65 mph (105 km/h). By early on September 13, convective banding wrapped almost completely around the center and cloud tops reached temperatures as low as −112 °F (−80 °C). However, because microwave satellite data could not determine if an eye had developed, Nadine's intensity was held at 70 mph (110 km/h)—–just below the threshold of hurricane status. The National Hurricane Center noted that "the window for Nadine to strengthen may be closing", citing computer model consensus of an increase in wind shear and little change in structure. The storm then began experiencing moderate southwesterly wind shear on September 13, generated by a mid- to upper-level trough and a shear axis a few hundred miles to the west of Nadine. As a result, the storm struggled to develop an eye and the center became more difficult to locate.

Although the storm was disorganized, a scatterometer pass indicated tropical storm force winds extended outward up to 230 miles (370 km). The satellite appearance of Nadine became more ragged by September 14. Despite this, the storm remained just below hurricane status and the National Hurricane Center noted the possibility of intensification if wind shear decreased in the next few days. Nadine turned northward on September 14 as it tracked along the periphery of a subtropical ridge. Soon after, a Tropical Rainfall Measuring Mission (TRMM) pass indicated that core convection began re-organizing. However, because wind shear displaced the mid-level circulation to the north of the low-level circulation, Nadine was not upgraded to a hurricane. Because Nadine would approach colder sea surface temperatures, significant strengthening was considered unlikely. Due to an increase in satellite intensity estimates and re-organization, Nadine was upgraded to a hurricane at 1800 UTC on September 14. Six hours later, Nadine reached an initial peak intensity with winds of 80 mph (130 km/h). Satellite imagery indicated that a ragged eye feature was attempting to develop late on September 15.

== Weakening and initial post-tropical transition ==
Tropical Storm Nadine passing south of the Azores on September 20

Late on September 15, National Hurricane Center forecaster Robbie Berg noted that Nadine began "to look a little more ragged", as microwave data observations noted shearing of deep convection to the northeast of the center. Late on September 16, the eye became tilted and disappeared, convective bands began disorganizing, and the overall shower and thunderstorm activity waned since early that day. Nadine weakened back to a tropical storm on September 17 and a trough reduced its satellite appearance.

Dry air began impacting Nadine on September 17, though outflow from the storm prevented significant weakening. Despite a large flare of deep convection over the northern semicircle, Nadine weakened slightly later that day. Further weakening occurred on the following day, after the burst in deep convection on September 17 deteriorated. Later on September 18, most of the deep convection dissipated. The strongest showers and thunderstorms that remained were in a band to the west and northwest of Nadine's center.

Nadine threatened the Azores while moving northeastward and then northward between September 18 and September 19, though a blocking ridge prevented the storm from approaching closer to the islands. Its closest approach to the Azores was about 150 miles (240 km) south-southwest of Flores Island on September 19. The storm then re-curved east-southeastward on September 20, after the ridge weakened and the mid- to upper-level trough deepened. By late on September 21, much of the remaining deep convection was composed of only a ragged convective band with warming cloud tops. Operationally, the National Hurricane Center re-classified Nadine as a subtropical storm at 2100 UTC on September 21, due to an above-average, asymmetrical wind field and an upper-level low pressure area near the center. However, post-season analysis concluded that Nadine degenerated into a non-tropical low pressure area three hours earlier.

== Regeneration, peak intensity, and demise ==
Tropical Storm Nadine on September 25

Early on September 22, the National Hurricane Center noted that regeneration into a tropical cyclone was a distinct possibility. The remnant low pressure area soon moved over warmer seas and a low-shear environment, causing deep convection to re-develop. Thus, Nadine became a tropical storm at 0000 UTC on September 23. Another blocking ridge over the Azores forced Nadine to move west-northwestward on September 24, causing it to execute a small cyclonic loop. Although winds increased to 60 mph (95 km/h), the storm weakened again and decreased to a 45 mph (72 km/h) tropical storm on September 25. Despite this regression, satellite imagery indicated that Nadine developed an eye-like feature. However, the National Hurricane Center later noted that it was a cloud-free region near the center of the storm. By September 26, Nadine curved south-southwestward to southwestward around the southeastern portion of a mid- to upper-level ridge over the western Atlantic.

After minimal change in strength for several days, Nadine finally began to intensify on September 27, due to sea surface temperatures warmer than 79 °F (26 °C). At 1200 UTC on September 28, Nadine re-strengthened into a Category 1 hurricane on the Saffir–Simpson hurricane wind scale. Around that time, satellite imagery indicated that the storm re-developed an eye feature. After becoming disorganized, the National Hurricane Center erroneously downgraded Nadine to a tropical storm on September 29 before upgrading it to a hurricane again six hours later. Nadine had actually remained a hurricane and was intensifying further. Winds increased to 85 mph (140 km/h) on September 30, after the eye became more distinct. At 1200 UTC, the storm attained its peak intensity with maximum sustained winds of 90 mph (150 km/h) and a minimum barometric pressure of 978 mbar (28.9 inHg).

After peak intensity, Nadine began weakening once again and deteriorated to a tropical storm at 1200 UTC, on October 1. Northwesterly winds began to increase on October 3, after an upper-level trough that was causing low wind shear moved eastward. A few hours later, the low-level center became partially exposed, before becoming fully separated from the convection by 1500 UTC. Due to strong wind shear and cold sea surface temperatures, showers and thunderstorms rapidly diminished, and by late on October 3, Nadine became devoid of any deep convection. At 0000 UTC on October 4, Nadine transitioned into an extratropical low-pressure area, while about 195 miles (314 km) southwest of the central Azores. The low rapidly moved northeastward, degenerated into a trough of low pressure, and was absorbed by a cold front later that day.

== Impact and records ==
Wettest tropical cyclones and their remnants in the United Kingdom Highest-known totals
| Precipitation | | | Storm | Location | Ref. |
| Rank | mm | in | Storm | Location | Ref. |
|---|---|---|---|---|---|
| 1 | 150.0 | 5.91 | Bertha 2014 | Inverness, Highland | |
| 2 | 135.0 | 5.31 | Charley 1986 | Abergwyngregyn, Gwynedd | |
| 3 | 130.0 | 5.12 | Nadine 2012 | Ravensworth, North Yorkshire | |
| 4 | 76.0 | 2.99 | Lili 1996 | Chale Bay, Isle of Wight | |
| 5 | 61.7 | 2.43 | Zeta 2020 | Chipping, Lancashire | |
| 6 | 48.8 | 1.92 | Grace 2009 | Capel Curig, Conwy | |
| 7 | 42.2 | 1.66 | Gordon 2006 | Wainfleet All Saints, Lincolnshire | |
| 8 | 38.0 | 1.50 | Gonzalo 2014 | Glenmoriston, Highland | |
| 9 | 31.0 | 1.22 | Bill 2009 | Shap, Cumbria | |
| 10 | 30.0 | 1.18 | Laura 2008 | Windermere, Cumbria | |

Tropical Storm Nadine re-approaching the Azores on October 3

Tropical cyclone warnings and watches were issued on two separate occasions as Nadine approached the Azores. At 1000 UTC on September 18, a tropical storm watch was issued for the islands of Flores and Corvo. Although the tropical storm watch was discontinued at 2100 UTC, a tropical storm warning was implemented at that time for the islands of Corvo, Faial, Flores, Graciosa, Pico, São Jorge, and Terceira. At 1500 UTC on September 19, a tropical storm warning was also issued for São Miguel and Santa Maria. All watches and warnings were discontinued by late on September 21. After re-generating, Nadine posed a threat to the Azores again, which resulted in a tropical storm watch for the entire archipelago at 1500 UTC on October 1. Nine hours later, 0000 UTC on the following day, the watch was upgraded to a tropical storm warning. After Nadine became extratropical, the warning was discontinued. On the storm's second approach toward the Azores, schools were closed and flight were cancelled.

Late on September 20, Flores reported a wind gust of 46 mph (74 km/h). A sustained wind speed of 62 mph (100 km/h) and a gust up to 81 mph (130 km/h) were reported at Horta on the island of Faial, as Nadine passed to the south on September 21. During the second Azores impact on October 4, the highest sustained wind speed reported was 38 mph (61 km/h) on São Miguel, while the strongest gust was 87 mph (140 km/h) at the Wind Power Plant on Santa Maria. On Pico Island, the pavement of the sports hall of the primary and secondary school in Lajes do Pico was destroyed. The remnants of Nadine produced a plume of moisture that dropped heavy rainfall over the United Kingdom, particularly in England and Wales, reaching 5.12 in (130 mm) at Ravensworth in the former. The rains flooded houses and disrupted roads and rails.

In Florida, two people drowned due to rip currents.

Nadine lasted a total of 24 days as a tropical, subtropical, and post-tropical cyclone, including 22.25 days as a tropical system. This makes it the fourth longest-lasting Atlantic tropical cyclone on record, only behind the 1899 San Ciriaco hurricane at 28 days, Hurricane Ginger in 1971 at 27.25 days, and Hurricane Inga in 1969 at 24.75 days. When only counting time spent as a tropical storm or hurricane – 20.75 days – Nadine is the third longest-lasting, behind only Hurricane Ginger in 1971 and the 1899 San Ciriaco hurricane. When Nadine was upgraded to a hurricane at 1800 UTC on September 14, it marked the third-earliest forming eighth hurricane, behind only an unnamed system in 1893 and Ophelia in 2005.

== See also ==
- List of Azores hurricanes
- Hurricane Alberto (2000)
- Hurricane Gordon (2006)
- Hurricane Leslie (2018)
