= Hurricane Gordon (2006) =

Category 3 Atlantic hurricane

- Gordon at peak intensity on September 14

Meteorological history
- Formed: September 10, 2006
- Extratropical: September 20, 2006
- Dissipated: September 24, 2006

Category 3 major hurricane
- 1-minute sustained (SSHWS/NWS)
- Highest winds: 120 mph (195 km/h)
- Lowest pressure: 955 mbar (hPa); 28.20 inHg

Overall effects
- Fatalities: None
- Damage: $3.8 million (2006 USD)
- Areas affected: Azores, Iberian Peninsula, British Isles
- IBTrACS
- Part of the 2006 Atlantic hurricane season

Hurricane Gordon was a powerful tropical cyclone that affected the Azores as a hurricane, and then parts of western Europe as an extratropical cyclone. The eighth tropical storm, third hurricane, and first major hurricane of the 2006 Atlantic hurricane season, Gordon formed on September 10 in the tropical Atlantic Ocean. It gradually matured into a hurricane as it tracked northward, reaching its peak intensity with winds of 195 km/h (121 mph) early on September 14 while located about 925 km (575 mi) southeast of Bermuda. After becoming nearly stationary, Gordon weakened to minimal hurricane status, although it re-intensified after accelerating to the east. It weakened again after moving over cooler waters, and passed through the Azores on September 20. Shortly thereafter, it became an extratropical cyclone and subsequently affected Spain, Ireland, and the United Kingdom.

The first tropical cyclone since 1992 to directly affect the Azores as a hurricane, the archipelago sustained little damage, in spite of wind gusts' reaching hurricane force on Santa Maria Island. Impact was much more significant from the storm in its extratropical phase. In Spain, wind gusts reached 183 km/h (114 mph) along the northwest coast and left 100,000 people without power. Five people in the country sustained storm-related injuries. Further north, the storm brought a surge of tropical air to Ireland and the United Kingdom, contributing to record warm temperatures. In Northern Ireland, high winds left 120,000 people without power and caused one injury.

== Meteorological history ==
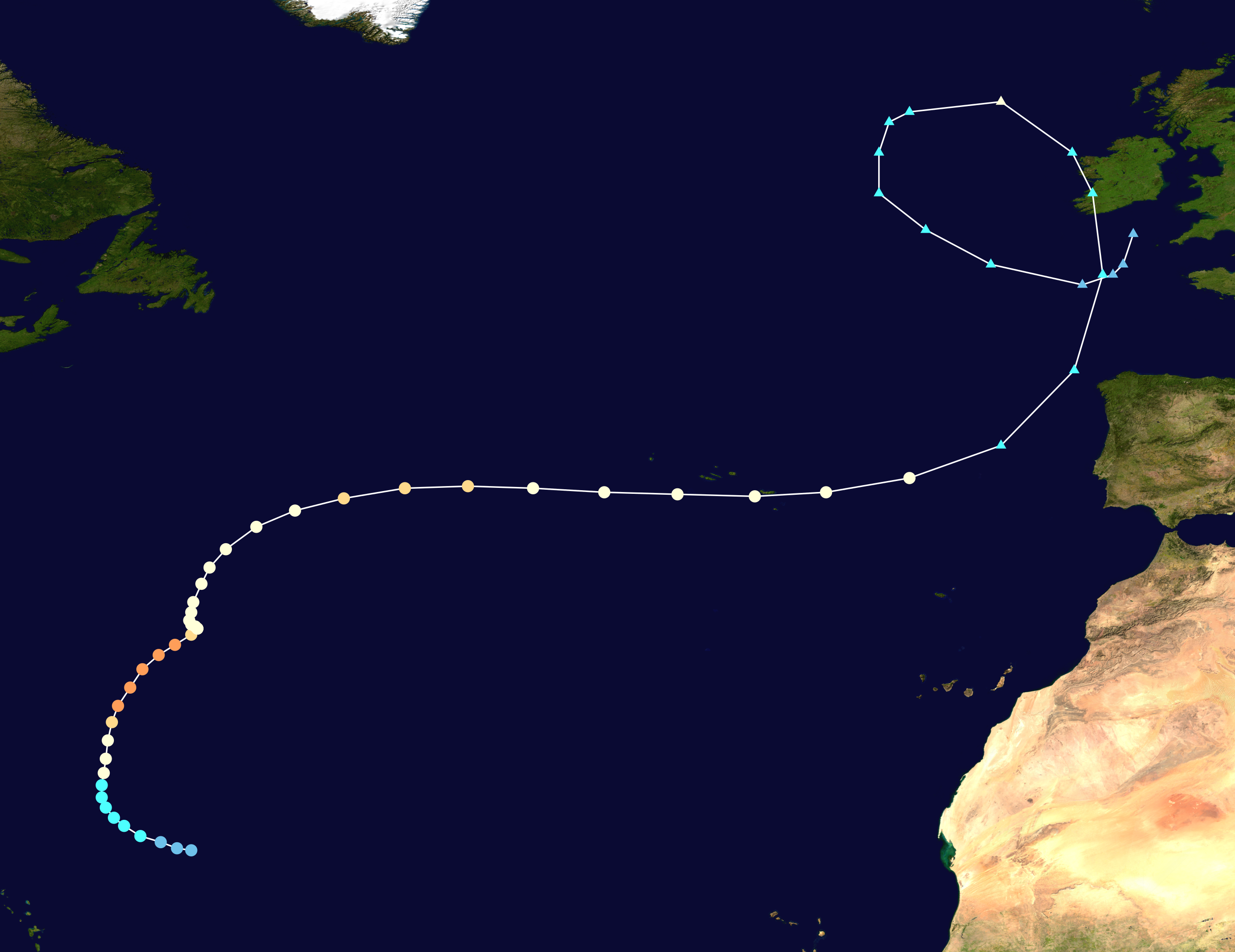
Map plotting the storm's track and intensity, according to the Saffir–Simpson scale Map key Saffir–Simpson scale Tropical depression (≤38 mph, ≤62 km/h) Tropical storm (39–73 mph, 63–118 km/h) Category 1 (74–95 mph, 119–153 km/h) Category 2 (96–110 mph, 154–177 km/h) Category 3 (111–129 mph, 178–208 km/h) Category 4 (130–156 mph, 209–251 km/h) Category 5 (≥157 mph, ≥252 km/h) Unknown Storm type Tropical cyclone Subtropical cyclone Extratropical cyclone, remnant low, tropical disturbance, or monsoon depression

On September 1, a tropical wave exited the west coast of Africa and quickly showed signs of organization. It possessed a low pressure area and some convection as the system moved generally westward. The United States National Hurricane Center (NHC) first pinpointed the system as an area for potential development late on September 2 while it was about 1,210 km (750 mi) west-southwest of Cape Verde. However, an upper level trough associated with the developing Hurricane Florence to its west increased wind shear across the region, which prevented significant tropical cyclone development over the next week. However, on September 5, the NHC noted the potential for the storm system to organize into a tropical depression within the next several days, but its close proximity to Florence continued to stall its strengthening. By September 9, the trough moved far enough away from the system to allow wind shear to yield, signalling an increase in convective thunderstorm activity. Around 18:00 UTC that day, the system developed into a tropical depression about 870 km (540 mi) east-northeast of the Lesser Antilles.

Upon developing, the depression, small in physical size, moved slowly west-north-westward. Initially, the NHC faced difficulties in forecasting the future of the system due to the potential for resumed strong wind shear, as well as uncertainty in its path of direction. It gradually organized and intensified, and based on observations from the Hurricane Hunters, the NHC assessed the depression as a tropical storm late on September 11; upon doing so, they named it Gordon. As it strengthened, Gordon developed more large outflow and increasing banding features. On September 12, the storm slowed and turned toward the north through a weakness in the subtropical ridge created by Florence. Wind shear decreased further, and the storm's convection became more symmetric with an intermittent eye feature in the center. Based on the presence of the eye and estimates from satellite imagery, it is estimated that Gordon intensified into a hurricane early on September 13.

Hurricane Gordon as seen from Space Shuttle Atlantis (STS-115) on September 17

After becoming a hurricane, Gordon underwent rapid deepening as the eye became better defined and more intense. In 24 hours, the winds increased by 72 km/h (45 mph) to a peak intensity of 195 km/h (121 mph) early on September 14, while located about 925 km (575 mi) southeast of Bermuda. This made Gordon a major hurricane, specifically a Category 3 on the Saffir-Simpson scale, the first of 2006. As it curved to the northeast, the hurricane maintained its peak intensity for about 24 hours, during which the eye decreased in size and the eyewall convection weakened. Afterward, Gordon began weakening due to moving over an area of cooler water temperatures. On September 15, the trough that was previously guiding the hurricane moved farther away, allowing the ridge to build to the north and causing Gordon's motion to become nearly stationary. Increased wind shear imparted further weakening, and the hurricane's slow motion resulted in upwelling – the motion of cooler water to the ocean's surface. On September 17, a building ridge to the east caused Gordon to begin a steady northeast motion. By that time, the convection had diminished significantly and the winds weakened to minimal hurricane-force. One NHC forecast predicted extratropical transition to occur within 48 hours.

Hurricanes Gordon (top) and Helene on September 18

On September 18, Hurricane Gordon began accelerating to the northeast around a strengthening ridge, and later toward the east as guided by a trough. Wind shear decreased, which allowed for convection to redevelop near the eye. Unexpectedly, the hurricane began restrengthening, despite moving over slightly cooler waters; instability from cooler upper-level temperatures allowed for the reintensification. Despite continued forecasts of a weakening trend, Gordon's resiliency presented a rare threat – the first since Hurricane Charley in 1992 – to the Azores, a Portuguese archipelago in the northeast Atlantic Ocean. At about 06:00 UTC on September 19, the hurricane attained its secondary peak intensity of 169 km/h (105 mph) about 775 km (482 mi) west-southwest of the Azores. By that time, the cyclone consisted of a solid ring of convection around a contracting eye. Shortly thereafter, Gordon began steadily weakening due to the combination of increasing wind shear and even cooler water temperatures. Its motion became just south of due east, causing the strongest winds to remain south of the islands. Around 09:00 UTC on September 20, Gordon passed through the Azores between the islands of Santa Maria and São Miguel, producing hurricane-force wind gusts on the former island. At the time, its sustained winds were estimated around 121 km/h (75 mph), which remained south of any landmasses. The cloud pattern had become less organized and more ragged.

After passing the Azores, Gordon began interacting with an approaching cold front. Early on September 21, it completed the transition into an extratropical storm while simultaneously weakening below hurricane-force, located about 443 km (275 mi) west-northwest of the west coast of Portugal. The cyclone maintained its identity as the system turned sharply northeastward and later northward, after passing about 160 km (99 mi) northwest of the Spanish province of Galicia. Its forward motion accelerated to about 97 km/h (60 mph), steered by another extratropical storm, while still maintaining sustained winds of 105 km/h (65 mph). After moving along the west coast of Ireland, the extratropical remnants of Gordon turned to the northwest and intensified to hurricane-force winds. It turned to the southwest and later to the southeast, completing a large cyclonic loop before dissipating on September 24 to the south of Ireland.

== Preparations and impact ==
Wettest tropical cyclones and their remnants in the United Kingdom Highest-known totals
Precipitation			Storm	Location	Ref.
Rank	mm	in	Storm	Location	Ref.
1	150.0	5.91	Bertha 2014	Inverness, Highland	
2	135.0	5.31	Charley 1986	Abergwyngregyn, Gwynedd	
3	130.0	5.12	Nadine 2012	Ravensworth, North Yorkshire	
4	76.0	2.99	Lili 1996	Chale Bay, Isle of Wight	
5	61.7	2.43	Zeta 2020	Chipping, Lancashire	
6	48.8	1.92	Grace 2009	Capel Curig, Conwy	
7	42.2	1.66	Gordon 2006	Wainfleet All Saints, Lincolnshire	
8	38.0	1.50	Gonzalo 2014	Glenmoriston, Highland	
9	31.0	1.22	Bill 2009	Shap, Cumbria	
10	30.0	1.18	Laura 2008	Windermere, Cumbria	

Late on September 18, while Gordon was beginning to accelerate to the northeast, a tropical storm watch was issued for all of the Azores. The hurricane was expected to weaken to tropical storm-force before affecting the islands. When it became apparent that Gordon would continue intensifying, a hurricane warning replaced the watch about 27 hours before the strongest winds affected the region. The advance of the storm forced the closure of all schools in the region. Concurrently, officials increased the number of emergency workers on stand-by. The two westernmost islands – Corvo and Flores – were placed under a red alert, the highest on a four-level scale, which indicated the greatest threat for severe weather. The remainder of the archipelago was placed on low alert. Ultimately, the Azores escaped significant damage as the hurricane passed farther south than expected. Overall impact was limited to toppled trees and power lines, leaving portions of Santa Maria Island without electrical service. Santa Maria recorded sustained winds of 56 mph (90 km/h), with gusts to 82 mph (132 km/h).

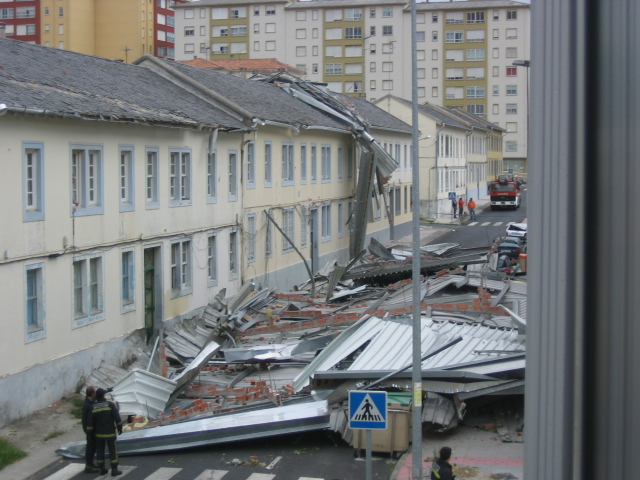
Wind damage from the remnants of Hurricane Gordon in Ferrol, Spain

In Portugal, coastal regions were put under a yellow alert, the second lowest level, since the extratropical remnants of Gordon were expected to produce rough seas and heavy rains. In Spain, the Galicia region was placed on red alert by authorities in anticipation of the storm. Classes on September 21 were also suspended by the regional education ministry. Eleven other regions of Spain, extending as far east as Madrid and as far south as Andalusia, received lower levels of warning. The storm's threat also prompted the cancellation or delay of flights along the coast. While passing northwest of Spain, the remnants of Gordon produced strong wind gusts, reaching 183 km/h (114 mph) at Punta Candieira in Galicia on the country's northwest coast. The nearby city of A Coruña recorded sustained winds of 43 mph (69 km/h), while further inland, a station near Madrid reported winds of 107 km/h (66 mph). Along the coast, waves reached 7 m (23 ft) in height, while rainbands dropped heavy precipitation, including a total of 65.5 mm (2.58 in) in Canfranc. Wind-blown debris injured four people in the country, and a fifth storm-related injury occurred as the result of a tree falling onto an occupied vehicle. The winds downed trees, traffic lights, and power lines, leaving about 100,000 people without power. Throughout Galicia, total monetary losses reached €3 million (US$3.8 million; 2006 USD).

Stormy conditions threatened to affect the 2006 Ryder Cup in Straffan, County Kildare, Ireland at the K Club, and September 25 was set aside as an additional "reserve day". The club's media center was briefly evacuated, and one woman at the event was injured after being struck by a tree branch broken by the storm. The remnants of Gordon caused stormy conditions that left at least 5,000 people without power in eastern and southern Ireland. One electric company had more than 400 workers on duty to restore power in affected areas. High winds blowing down trees were responsible for power outages which affected 126,000 people in Northern Ireland.

The remnants of Gordon affected the United Kingdom with strong winds, including gusts to 97 km/h (60 mph) in the Isles of Scilly off the southwest coast and 81 mph (130 km/h) on the mainland. The storm interfered with an archaeological excavation undertaken by Time Team at Mount Murray on the Isle of Man, which was broadcast as part of the first episode of the 14th series. The storm system produced heavy precipitation and thunderstorms that caused localized flooding. Wainfleet, Lincolnshire recorded 42.2 mm (1.66 in) of rainfall, of which almost half fell within the span of an hour. High winds delayed rail service, and in Dawlish, the rail line was damaged by coastal flooding. More than 1,000 homes were left without power in Truro, Cornwall. The storm brought moist air northward that contributed to record warm temperatures across portions of the UK.

== See also ==
- Other storms of the same name
- List of Azores hurricanes
- Tropical cyclone effects in Europe
