= State Line, Mississippi =

- Town
- Flag

- Location of State Line, Mississippi

- Location in the United States
- Coordinates: 31°26′16″N 88°28′34″W
- Country: United States
- State: Mississippi
- Counties: Greene, Wayne

Area
  - Total: 4.30 sq mi (11.13 km^{2})
  - Land: 4.26 sq mi (11.04 km^{2})
  - Water: 0.035 sq mi (0.09 km^{2})
- Elevation: 253 ft (77 m)

Population (2020)
  - Total: 452
  - Density: 106.0/sq mi (40.93/km^{2})
- Time zone: UTC-6 (Central (CST))
  - Summer (DST): UTC-5 (CDT)
- ZIP code: 39362
- Area code: 601
- FIPS code: 28-70320
- GNIS feature ID: 0678229

State Line is a town in Greene and Wayne counties, Mississippi, in the United States. The population was 452 at the 2020 census.

== History ==
In 1854, the Mobile and Ohio Railroad laid track and built a train station at State Line.

A post office was established in 1856, and the town incorporated in 1875. State Line was located on the Mobile and Ohio Railroad, built through Mississippi in the 1850s. The next station north was in Eret, 2.5 miles (4.0 km) away.

== Geography ==
State Line is located at 31°26′16″N 88°28′34″W (31.437799, -88.476104). The town is on the border between Wayne County on the north and Greene County on the south, with the town's area approximately equally in both. In the 2010 census, 304 of the town's 565 residents (53.8%) lived in Greene County and 261 (46.2%) in Wayne County.

The town center is 1.5 miles (2.4 km) west of the Alabama–Mississippi border. U.S. Route 45 passes through the northeast corner of the town, leading northwest 20 miles (32 km) to Waynesboro, the Wayne County seat, and southeast 63 miles (101 km) to Mobile, Alabama. Mississippi Highway 57 passes through the east side of State Line, leading south 23 miles (37 km) to Leakesville, the Greene County seat. Mississippi Highway 42 passes through the center of State Line as St. Peter Street, leading west 53 miles (85 km) to Hattiesburg.

According to the United States Census Bureau, the town of State Line has a total area of 4.30 square miles (11.1 km^{2}), of which 4.27 square miles (11.1 km^{2}) is land and 0.03 square miles (0.078 km^{2}) (0.70%) is water.

== Demographics ==
Historical population
Census	Pop.	Note	%±
1880	97		—
1900	379		—
1910	363		−4.2%
1930	358		—
1940	542		51.4%
1950	492		−9.2%
1960	653		32.7%
1970	598		−8.4%
1980	484		−19.1%
1990	395		−18.4%
2000	555		40.5%
2010	565		1.8%
2020	452		−20.0%
U.S. Decennial Census

=== Racial and ethnic composition ===
State Line town, Mississippi – Racial and ethnic composition Note: the US Census treats Hispanic/Latino as an ethnic category. This table excludes Latinos from the racial categories and assigns them to a separate category. Hispanics/Latinos may be of any race.
Race / Ethnicity (NH = Non-Hispanic)	Pop 2000	Pop 2010	Pop 2020	% 2000	% 2010	% 2020
White alone (NH)	237	235	184	42.70%	41.59%	40.71%
Black or African American alone (NH)	316	323	245	56.94%	57.17%	54.20%
Native American or Alaska Native alone (NH)	0	1	3	0.00%	0.18%	0.66%
Asian alone (NH)	0	0	1	0.00%	0.00%	0.22%
Native Hawaiian or Pacific Islander alone (NH)	0	0	0	0.00%	0.00%	0.00%
Other race alone (NH)	0	0	1	0.00%	0.00%	0.22%
Mixed race or Multiracial (NH)	2	2	11	0.36%	0.35%	2.43%
Hispanic or Latino (any race)	0	4	7	0.00%	0.71%	1.55%
Total	555	565	452	100.00%	100.00%	100.00%

=== 2020 census ===
As of the 2020 United States census, there were 452 people, 250 households, and 176 families residing in the town.

=== 2000 census ===
As of the census of 2000, there were 555 people, 197 households, and 148 families residing in the town. The population density was 130.1 inhabitants per square mile (50.2/km^{2}). There were 230 housing units at an average density of 53.9 units per square mile (20.8 units/km^{2}). The racial makeup of the town was 42.70% White, 56.94% African American, and 0.36% from two or more races.

There were 197 households, out of which 39.1% had children under the age of 18 living with them, 41.1% were married couples living together, 29.9% had a female householder with no husband present, and 24.4% were non-families. 21.8% of all households were made up of individuals, and 9.6% had someone living alone who was 65 years of age or older. The average household size was 2.82 and the average family size was 3.29.

In the town, the population was spread out, with 34.4% under the age of 18, 11.4% from 18 to 24, 26.8% from 25 to 44, 16.8% from 45 to 64, and 10.6% who were 65 years of age or older. The median age was 28 years. For every 100 females, there were 82.6 males. For every 100 females age 18 and over, there were 72.5 males.

The median income for a household in the town was $22,500, and the median income for a family was $27,083. Males had a median income of $26,563 versus $20,625 for females. The per capita income for the town was $9,030. About 28.4% of families and 33.6% of the population were below the poverty line, including 46.9% of those under age 18 and 25.4% of those age 65 or over.

== Education ==
The Wayne County portion of State Line is served by the Wayne County School District. The Greene County portion is served by the Greene County School District.
