= Wabo =

Wabo may refer to:

- Wabo language, a Malayo-Polynesian language of Papua, Indonesia
- Charlie Wabo (born 1984), Papua New Guinean rugby league footballer
- Norman Wabo (born 1998), English association footballer
- WABO (AM), a radio station in Waynesboro, Mississippi
- WABO-FM, a radio station in Waynesboro, Mississippi

== See also ==
- Cabo Wabo, a nightclub and restaurant in Cabo San Lucas, Mexico
