= Central dense overcast =

Large central area of thunderstorms surrounding its circulation center

Tropical Storm Ana (2009) with its small CDO

The central dense overcast, or CDO, of a tropical cyclone or strong subtropical cyclone is the large central area of thunderstorms surrounding its circulation center, caused by the formation of its eyewall. It can be round, angular, oval, or irregular in shape. This feature shows up in tropical cyclones of tropical storm or hurricane strength. How far the center is embedded within the CDO, and the temperature difference between the cloud tops within the CDO and the cyclone's eye, can help determine a tropical cyclone's intensity with the Dvorak technique. Locating the center within the CDO can be a problem with strong tropical storms and minimal hurricanes as its location can be obscured by the CDO's high cloud canopy. This center location problem can be resolved through the use of microwave satellite imagery.

After a cyclone strengthens to around hurricane intensity, an eye appears at the center of the CDO, defining its center of low pressure and its cyclonic wind field. Tropical cyclones with changing intensity have more lightning within their CDO than steady state storms. Tracking cloud features within the CDO using frequently updated satellite imagery can also be used to determine a cyclone's intensity. The highest maximum sustained winds within a tropical cyclone, as well as its heaviest rainfall, are usually located under the coldest cloud tops in the CDO.

== Characteristics ==
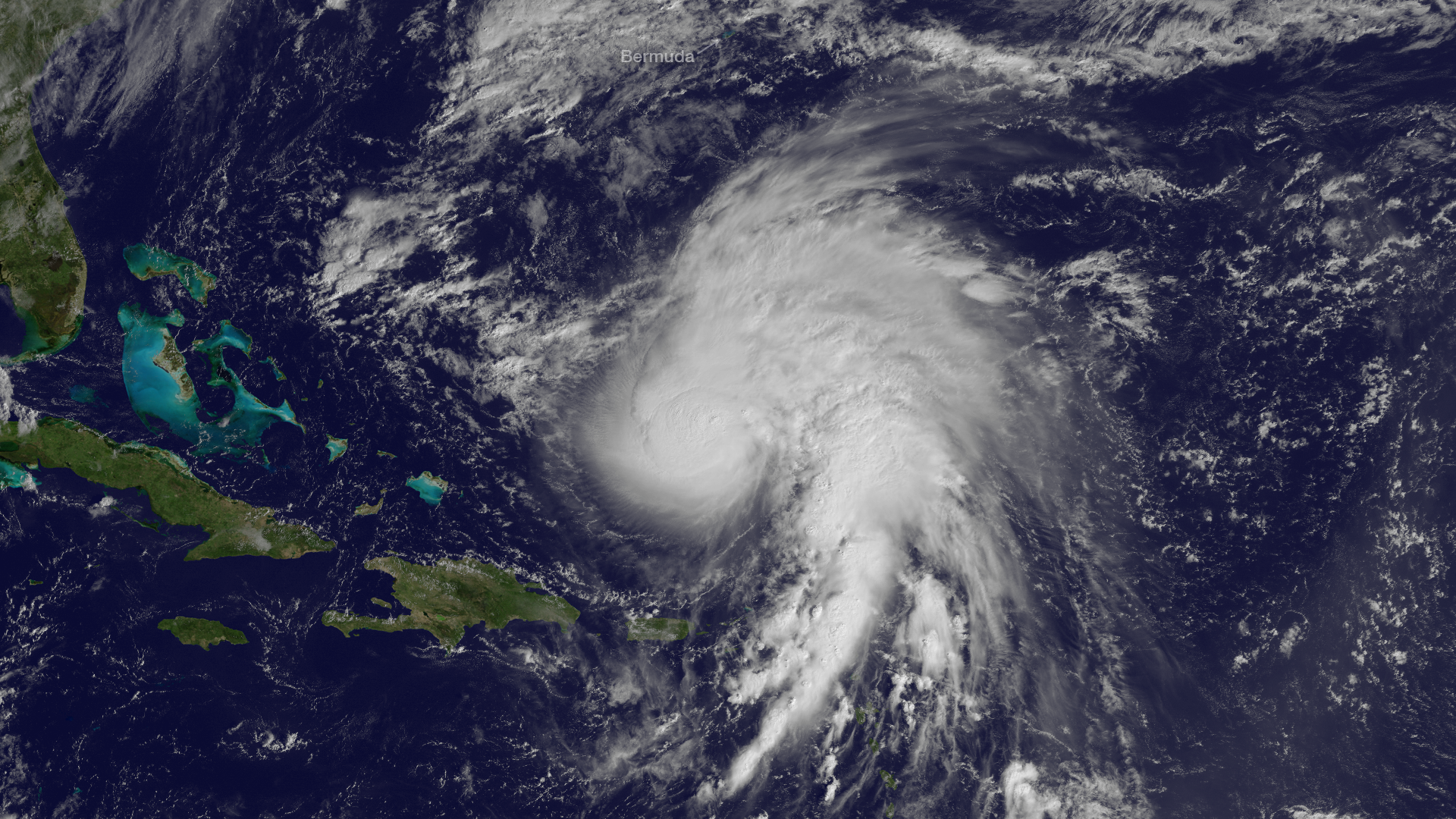
Tropical storm Rafael displaying an example of a CDO.

It is a large region of thunderstorms surrounding the center of stronger tropical and subtropical cyclones which shows up brightly (with cold cloud tops) on satellite imagery. The CDO forms due to the development of an eyewall within a tropical cyclone. Its shape can be round, oval, angular, or irregular. Its development can be preceded by a narrow, dense, C-shaped convective band. Early in its development, the CDO is often angular or oval in shape, which rounds out, increases in size, and appears more smooth as a tropical cyclone intensifies. Rounder CDO shapes occur in environments with low levels of vertical wind shear.

The strongest winds within tropical cyclones tend to be located under the deepest convection within the CDO, which is seen on satellite imagery as the coldest cloud tops. The radius of maximum wind is usually collocated with the coldest cloud tops within the CDO, which is also the area where a tropical cyclone's rainfall reaches its maximum intensity. For mature tropical cyclones that are steady state, the CDO contains nearly no lightning activity, though lightning is more common within weaker tropical cyclones and for systems fluctuating in intensity.

== Eye ==
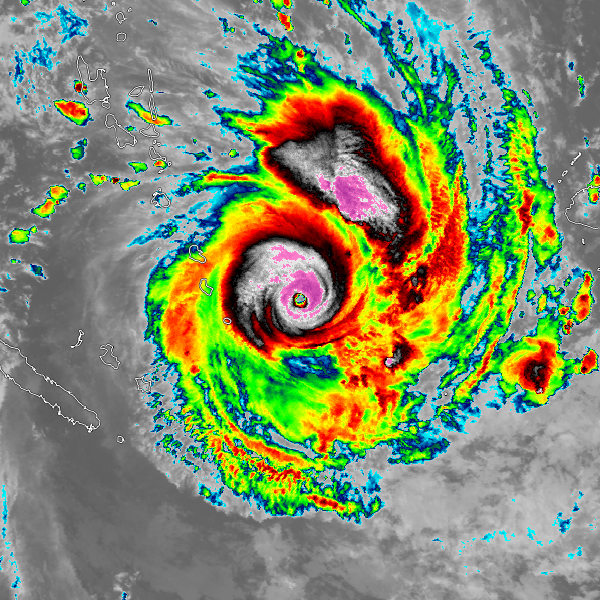
Cyclone Winston in the Southern Hemisphere with a large CDO surrounding its eye

The eye is a region of mostly calm weather at the center of the CDO of strong tropical cyclones. The eye of a storm is a roughly circular area, typically 30–65 kilometres (19–40 mi) in diameter. It is surrounded by the eyewall, a ring of towering thunderstorms surrounding its center of circulation. The cyclone's lowest barometric pressure occurs in the eye, and can be as much as 15% lower than the atmospheric pressure outside the storm. In weaker tropical cyclones, the eye is less well-defined or nonexistent, and can be covered by cloudiness caused by cirrus cloud outflow from the surrounding central dense overcast.

== Use as a tropical cyclone strength indicator ==
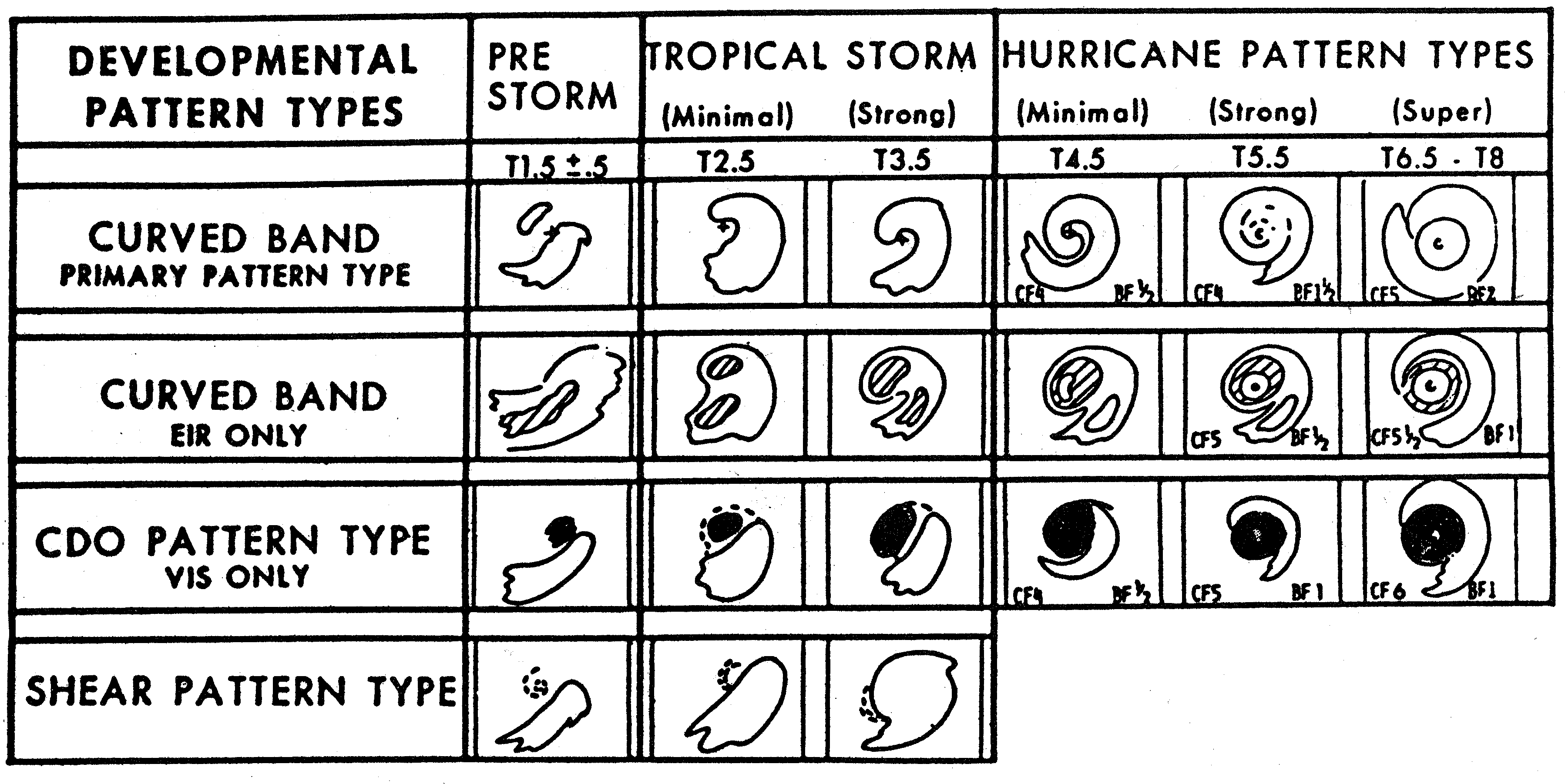
Common developmental patterns seen during tropical cyclone development, and their Dvorak-assigned intensities

Within the Dvorak satellite strength estimate for tropical cyclones, there are several visual patterns that a cyclone may take on which define the upper and lower bounds on its intensity. The central dense overcast (CDO) pattern is one of those patterns. The central dense overcast utilizes the size of the CDO. The CDO pattern intensities start at T2.5, equivalent to minimal tropical storm intensity, 64 km/h (40 mph). The shape of the central dense overcast is also considered. The farther the center is tucked into the CDO, the stronger it is deemed. Banding features can be utilized to objectively determine the tropical cyclone's center, using a ten degree logarithmic spiral. Using the 85–92 GHz channels of polar-orbiting microwave satellite imagery can definitively locate the center within the CDO.

Tropical cyclones with maximum sustained winds between 105 km/h (65 mph) and 160 km/h (100 mph) can have their center of circulations obscured by cloudiness within visible and infrared satellite imagery, which makes diagnosis of their intensity a challenge. Winds within tropical cyclones can also be estimated by tracking features within the CDO using rapid scan geostationary satellite imagery, whose pictures are taken minutes apart rather than every half-hour.
