= Wayne County, Mississippi =

County in Mississippi, United States

- County
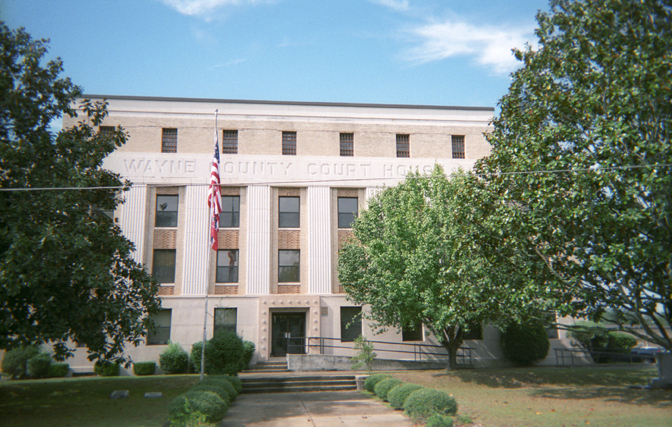
- Wayne County Courthouse in Waynesboro

- Location within the U.S. state of Mississippi
- Coordinates: 31°38′N 88°42′W
- Country: United States
- State: Mississippi
- Founded: 1809
- Named for: Anthony Wayne
- Seat: Waynesboro
- Largest city: Waynesboro

Area
  - Total: 814 sq mi (2,110 km^{2})
  - Land: 811 sq mi (2,100 km^{2})
  - Water: 2.8 sq mi (7.3 km^{2}) 0.3%

Population (2020)
  - Total: 19,779
  - Estimate (2025): 19,807 ▲
  - Density: 24.4/sq mi (9.42/km^{2})
- Time zone: UTC−6 (Central)
  - Summer (DST): UTC−5 (CDT)
- Congressional district: 4th
- Website: www.waynecounty.ms

Wayne County is a county located in the U.S. state of Mississippi. As of the 2020 census, the population was 19,779. Its county seat is Waynesboro. The county is named for General Anthony Wayne.

== Geography ==
According to the U.S. Census Bureau, the county has a total area of 814 square miles (2,110 km^{2}), of which 811 square miles (2,100 km^{2}) is land and 2.8 square miles (7.3 km^{2}) (0.3%) is water. It is the fifth-largest county in Mississippi by land area.

=== Major highways ===
- U.S. Highway 45
- U.S. Highway 84
- Mississippi Highway 63

=== Adjacent counties ===
- Clarke County (north)
- Choctaw County, Alabama (northeast)
- Washington County, Alabama (southeast)
- Greene County (south)
- Perry County (southwest)
- Jones County (west)
- Jasper County (northwest)

=== National protected area ===
- De Soto National Forest (part)

== Demographics ==
Historical population
Census	Pop.	Note	%±
1810	1,253		—
1820	3,323		165.2%
1830	2,781		−16.3%
1840	2,120		−23.8%
1850	2,892		36.4%
1860	3,691		27.6%
1870	4,206		14.0%
1880	8,741		107.8%
1890	9,817		12.3%
1900	12,539		27.7%
1910	14,709		17.3%
1920	15,467		5.2%
1930	15,295		−1.1%
1940	16,928		10.7%
1950	17,010		0.5%
1960	16,258		−4.4%
1970	16,650		2.4%
1980	19,135		14.9%
1990	19,517		2.0%
2000	21,216		8.7%
2010	20,747		−2.2%
2020	19,779		−4.7%
2025 (est.)	19,807	▲	0.1%
U.S. Decennial Census; 1790–1960 1900–1990; 1990–2000 2010–2013

=== Racial and ethnic composition ===
Wayne County, Mississippi – Racial and ethnic composition Note: the US Census treats Hispanic/Latino as an ethnic category. This table excludes Latinos from the racial categories and assigns them to a separate category. Hispanics/Latinos may be of any race.
Race / Ethnicity (NH = Non-Hispanic)	Pop 1980	Pop 1990	Pop 2000	Pop 2010	Pop 2020	% 1980	% 1990	% 2000	% 2010	% 2020
White alone (NH)	12,651	12,469	12,955	12,243	11,313	66.11%	63.89%	61.06%	59.01%	57.20%
Black or African American alone (NH)	6,313	6,920	8,017	8,035	7,708	32.99%	35.46%	37.79%	38.73%	38.97%
Native American or Alaska Native alone (NH)	9	19	14	38	31	0.05%	0.10%	0.07%	0.18%	0.16%
Asian alone (NH)	12	32	31	34	35	0.06%	0.16%	0.15%	0.16%	0.18%
Native Hawaiian or Pacific Islander alone (NH)	x	x	2	2	2	x	x	0.01%	0.01%	0.01%
Other race alone (NH)	1	2	0	3	11	0.01%	0.01%	0.00%	0.01%	0.06%
Mixed race or Multiracial (NH)	x	x	63	146	336	x	x	0.30%	0.70%	1.70%
Hispanic or Latino (any race)	149	75	134	246	343	0.78%	0.38%	0.63%	1.19%	1.73%
Total	19,135	19,517	21,216	20,747	19,779	100.00%	100.00%	100.00%	100.00%	100.00%

=== 2020 census ===
As of the 2020 census, the county had a population of 19,779. The median age was 40.1 years. 24.0% of residents were under the age of 18 and 17.8% of residents were 65 years of age or older. For every 100 females there were 91.4 males, and for every 100 females age 18 and over there were 87.8 males age 18 and over.

The racial makeup of the county was 57.4% White, 39.1% Black or African American, 0.2% American Indian and Alaska Native, 0.2% Asian, <0.1% Native Hawaiian and Pacific Islander, 1.1% from some other race, and 2.1% from two or more races. Hispanic or Latino residents of any race comprised 1.7% of the population.

<0.1% of residents lived in urban areas, while 100.0% lived in rural areas.

There were 7,977 households in the county, of which 31.8% had children under the age of 18 living in them. Of all households, 43.4% were married-couple households, 18.8% were households with a male householder and no spouse or partner present, and 33.2% were households with a female householder and no spouse or partner present. About 29.2% of all households were made up of individuals and 12.8% had someone living alone who was 65 years of age or older.

There were 9,031 housing units, of which 11.7% were vacant. Among occupied housing units, 78.5% were owner-occupied and 21.5% were renter-occupied. The homeowner vacancy rate was 1.2% and the rental vacancy rate was 9.8%.

== Communities ==
=== Cities ===
- Waynesboro (county seat)

=== Towns ===
- State Line (mainly located in Greene County)

=== Census-designated places ===
- Buckatunna
- Clara

=== Unincorporated communities ===
- Chicora
- Eret
- Matherville
- Eucutta
- Robinsons Junction (or Robinson's Junction)

=== Ghost towns ===
- Winchester

== Politics ==
Wayne County was originally a Democratic stronghold, but like many parts of Mississippi it swung to the Republican Party beginning in the 1960s. The last Democrat to win the county was Jimmy Carter in 1976, and in 2024 Donald Trump earned the highest share of the votes in the county for a Republican since the lopsided 1972 election.

United States presidential election results for Wayne County, Mississippi
Year	Republican		Democratic		Third party(ies)	
Year	No.	%	No.	%	No.	%
1912	15	2.29%	569	86.87%	71	10.84%
1916	47	5.41%	787	90.67%	34	3.92%
1920	112	15.84%	547	77.37%	48	6.79%
1924	56	5.83%	905	94.17%	0	0.00%
1928	289	23.96%	917	76.04%	0	0.00%
1932	23	2.19%	1,023	97.43%	4	0.38%
1936	44	3.12%	1,367	96.81%	1	0.07%
1940	22	1.56%	1,388	98.44%	0	0.00%
1944	35	2.47%	1,380	97.53%	0	0.00%
1948	4	0.29%	137	9.96%	1,235	89.75%
1952	717	30.89%	1,604	69.11%	0	0.00%
1956	373	17.52%	1,493	70.13%	263	12.35%
1960	490	21.94%	707	31.66%	1,036	46.39%
1964	3,539	92.77%	276	7.23%	0	0.00%
1968	247	4.87%	739	14.56%	4,089	80.57%
1972	4,648	82.08%	975	17.22%	40	0.71%
1976	3,022	47.06%	3,306	51.48%	94	1.46%
1980	3,844	52.07%	3,494	47.32%	45	0.61%
1984	5,000	63.81%	2,818	35.96%	18	0.23%
1988	4,496	60.64%	2,889	38.97%	29	0.39%
1992	3,874	49.78%	3,064	39.37%	845	10.86%
1996	3,219	49.60%	2,652	40.86%	619	9.54%
2000	4,635	60.16%	2,981	38.69%	89	1.16%
2004	5,562	63.25%	3,193	36.31%	39	0.44%
2008	6,070	60.57%	3,890	38.81%	62	0.62%
2012	6,111	59.15%	4,148	40.15%	73	0.71%
2016	5,990	62.40%	3,524	36.71%	85	0.89%
2020	6,307	62.72%	3,624	36.04%	125	1.24%
2024	6,013	65.94%	3,028	33.21%	78	0.86%

== Education ==
There are three school districts in the county, Wayne County School District, Wayne Central School District and Waynesboro Riverview School.

The county is in the zone for Jones College.

== See also ==
- National Register of Historic Places listings in Wayne County, Mississippi
