= Timeline of the 2009 Atlantic hurricane season =

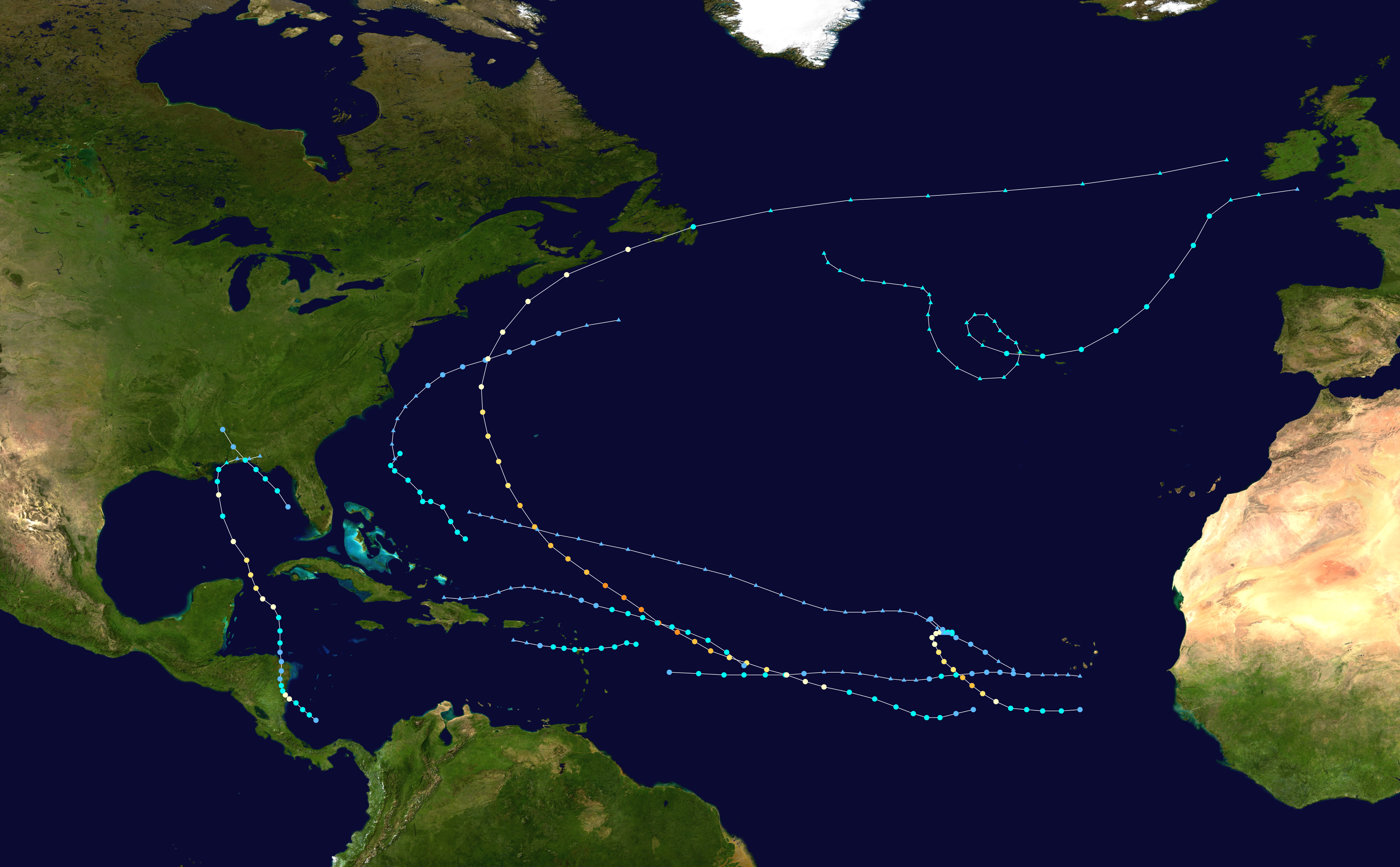
- Season summary map

Season boundaries
- First system formed: May 28, 2009
- Last system dissipated: November 10, 2009

Strongest system
- Name: Bill
- Maximum winds: 130 mph (215 km/h) (1-minute sustained)
- Lowest pressure: 943 mbar (hPa; 27.85 inHg)

Longest lasting system
- Name: Bill
- Duration: 9 days
Storm articles
- Tropical Storm Ana (2009)
- Hurricane Bill (2009)
- Tropical Storm Claudette (2009)
- Tropical Storm Danny (2009)
- Tropical Storm Erika (2009)
- Tropical Storm Grace (2009)
- Hurricane Ida (2009)

The 2009 Atlantic hurricane season was an event in the annual tropical cyclone season in the North Atlantic Ocean. It was a below-average Atlantic hurricane season with nine named storms, the fewest since the 1997 season. (Note: An average season, as defined by the National Oceanic and Atmospheric Administration, has twelve tropical storms, six hurricanes and two major hurricanes.) The season officially began on June 1, 2009, and ended on November 30, 2009, dates that conventionally delimit the period of each year when most tropical cyclones develop in the Atlantic basin. The first storm to form was Tropical Depression One on May 28, 2009 (one of three in 2009 that did not become a tropical storm), while the last storm, Hurricane Ida, dissipated on November 10.

Of the year's nine named storms, three became hurricanes with two intensifying further into major hurricanes. (Note: Hurricanes reaching Category 3 (wind speeds of 111 miles per hour (179 km/h)) or higher on the 5-level Saffir–Simpson wind speed scale are considered major hurricanes.) The inactivity throughout the basin was linked to the formation of an El Niño, which increased wind shear. The two most significant storms of the season, in terms of loss of life and damage, were Hurricanes Bill and Ida. Hurricane Bill was an unusually large storm and was also the season's strongest, attaining winds of 135 mph (215 km/h). Tropical Storm Claudette was the only storm in 2009 to make landfall in the United States; Hurricane Ida became extratropical shortly before coming ashore in Alabama.

This timeline documents tropical cyclone formations, strengthening, weakening, landfalls, extratropical transitions, and dissipations during the season. It includes information that was not released throughout the season, meaning that data from post-storm reviews by the National Hurricane Center, such as a storm that was not initially warned upon, has been included.

The time stamp for each event is first stated using Coordinated Universal Time (UTC), the 24-hour clock where 00:00 = midnight UTC. The NHC uses both UTC and the time zone where the center of the tropical cyclone is currently located. The time zones utilized (east to west) prior to 2020 were: Atlantic, Eastern, and Central. In this timeline, the respective area time is included in parentheses. Additionally, figures for maximum sustained winds and position estimates are rounded to the nearest 5 units (miles, or kilometers), following National Hurricane Center practice. Direct wind observations are rounded to the nearest whole number. Atmospheric pressures are listed to the nearest millibar and nearest hundredth of an inch of mercury.

== Timeline of events ==
=== May ===
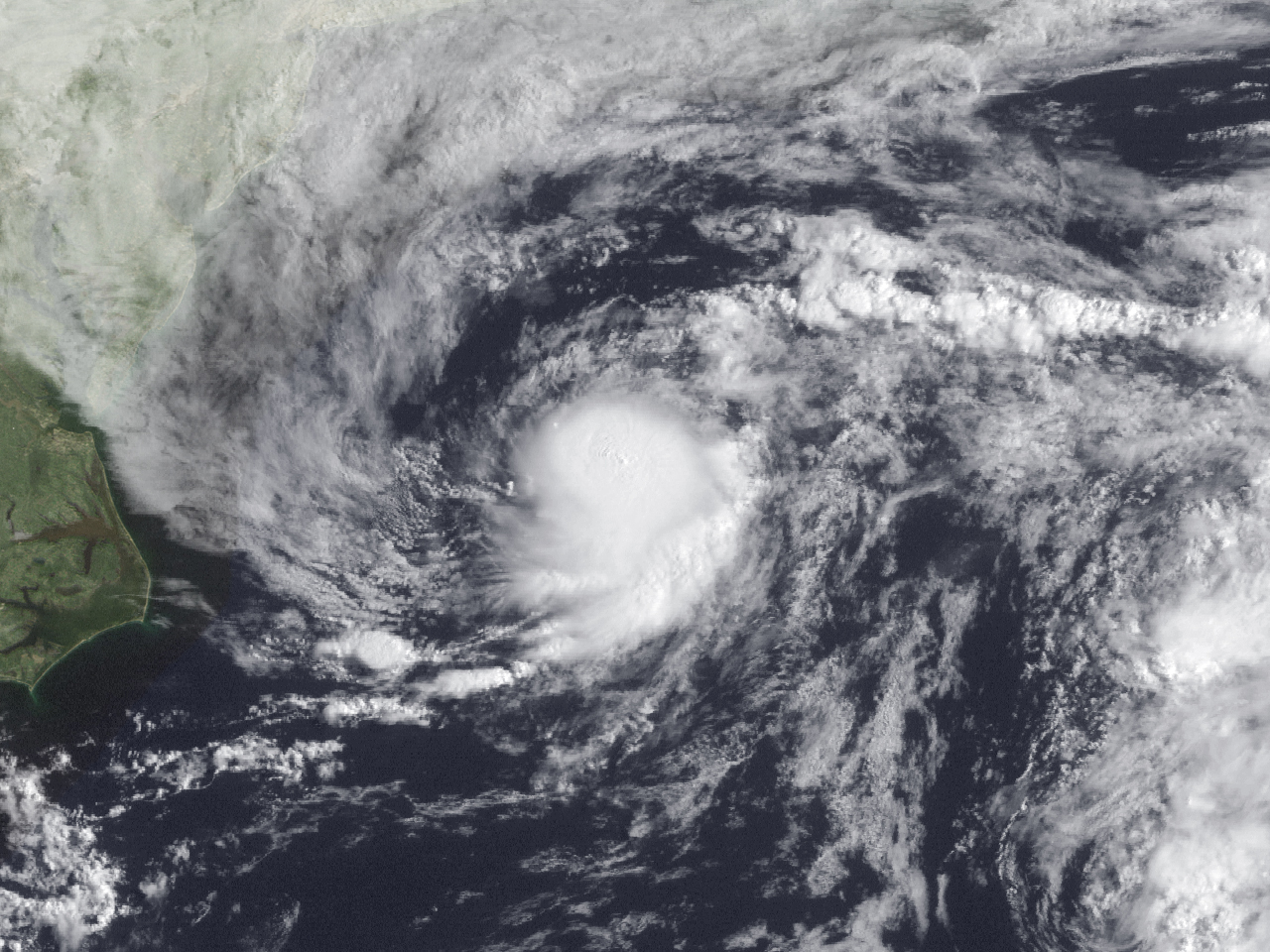
Pre-season Tropical Depression One on May 28

May 28

- 1 a.m. EDT (0600 UTC) – Tropical Depression One develops from an area of low pressure roughly 175 mi (280 km) east-northeast of Cape Hatteras, North Carolina.
- 1 p.m. EDT (1800 UTC) – Tropical Depression One attains its peak intensity with winds of 35 mph (55 km/h) and a barometric pressure of 1006 mbar (hPa; 29.71 inHg).

May 29

- 7 p.m. EDT (0000 UTC on May 30) – Tropical Depression One degenerates into a non-convective remnant low-pressure area roughly 345 mi (555 km) south-southeast of Halifax, Nova Scotia.

=== June ===
- No tropical cyclones formed during the month of June.

June 1

- 12 a.m. EDT (0400 UTC) – The 2009 Atlantic hurricane season officially begins.

=== July ===
- No tropical cyclones formed during the month of July, making the 2009 season one of fourteen since 1944 in which no tropical storms developed during June and July.

=== August ===
Hurricane Bill near peak intensity

August 11

- 2:00 a.m. AST (0600 UTC) – Tropical Depression Two develops from a tropical wave roughly 230 mi (370 km) west of the Cape Verde Islands.

August 12

- 8:00 a.m. AST (1200 UTC) – Post-season research indicated that at this time, Tropical Depression Two attained tropical storm status. However, as it was not operationally recognized as such, it was not named.
- 8:00 p.m. AST (0000 UTC on August 13) – Tropical Storm Ana weakens into a tropical depression.

August 13

- 2:00 a.m. AST (0600 UTC) – Tropical Depression Two degenerates into a non-convective remnant low about 775 mi (1,250 km) west of the Cape Verde Islands.

August 14

- 8:00 p.m. AST (0000 UTC on August 15) – The remnants of Tropical Depression Two regenerate into a tropical depression roughly 1,075 mi (1,730 km) east of the Lesser Antilles.

August 15

- 2:00 a.m. AST (0600 UTC) – Tropical Depression Two strengthens into Tropical Storm Ana. The storm also attains its peak intensity with winds of 40 mph (65 km/h) and a minimum pressure of 1003 mbar (hPa; 29.62 inHg).
- 2:00 a.m. AST (0600 UTC) – Tropical Depression Three forms out of a tropical wave roughly 380 mi (610 km) west-southwest of the Cape Verde islands.
- 2:00 p.m. AST (1800 UTC) – Tropical Depression Three strengthens into Tropical Storm Bill.

August 16

- 1:00 a.m. EDT (0600 UTC) – Tropical Depression Four develops over the eastern Gulf of Mexico, roughly 60 mi (95 km) west-southwest of Sarasota, Florida.
- 7:00 a.m. EDT (1200 UTC) – Tropical Depression Four strengthens into Tropical Storm Claudette.
- 8:00 a.m. AST (1200 UTC) – Tropical Storm Ana weakens into a tropical depression shortly before degenerating into a trough of low pressure roughly 400 mi (645 km) east of the Lesser Antilles.
- 1:00 p.m. EDT (1800 UTC) – Tropical Storm Claudette attains its peak winds of 60 mph (95 km/h) while situated roughly 40 mi (65 km) south of Apalachicola, Florida.
- 7:00 p.m. EDT (0000 UTC on August 17) – Tropical Storm Claudette attains its minimum pressure of 1005 mbar (hPa; 29.68 inHg) just off the Florida coastline.

August 17

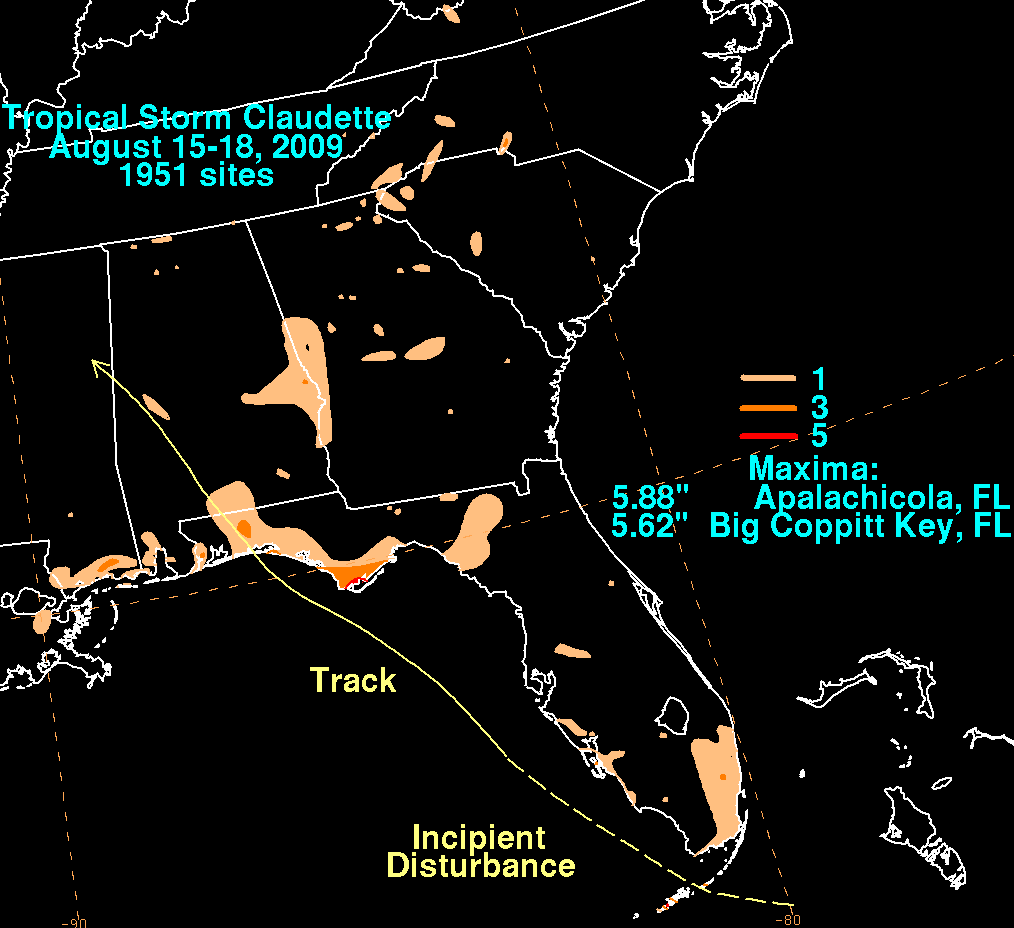
Rainfall totals from Tropical Storm Claudette in the Southeast United States

- 12:30 a.m. EDT (0530 UTC) – Tropical Storm Claudette makes landfall near Fort Walton Beach, Florida with winds of 45 mph (70 km/h).
- 2:00 a.m. AST (0600 UTC) – Tropical Storm Bill strengthens into a Category 1 hurricane midway between the Lesser Antilles and the Cape Verde Islands.
- 7:00 a.m. EDT (1200 UTC) – Tropical Storm Claudette weakens to a tropical depression over Alabama.
- 7:00 p.m. EDT (0000 UTC on August 18) – Tropical Depression Claudette dissipates over eastern Mississippi.
- 8:00 p.m. AST (0000 UTC on August 18) – Hurricane Bill strengthens to a Category 2 hurricane.

August 18

- 2:00 p.m. AST (1800 UTC) – Hurricane Bill strengthens into a major hurricane—a storm with winds of 111 mph (179 km/h) or higher.

August 19

- 2:00 a.m. AST (0600 UTC) – Hurricane Bill strengthens to a Category 4 hurricane, attaining its peak winds of 135 mph (215 km/h).

August 20

- 8:00 a.m. AST (1200 UTC) – Hurricane Bill weakens to a Category 3 hurricane.
- 8:00 a.m. AST (0000 UTC on August 21) – Hurricane Bill attains its secondary peak intensity with winds of 125 mph (200 km/h) and a minimum pressure of 943 mbar (hPa; 27.85 inHg), the lowest pressure recorded in any storm during the 2009 season.

August 21

- 2:00 p.m. AST (1800 UTC) – Hurricane Bill weakens to a Category 2 hurricane.

August 22

Tropical Storm Danny shortly after peak intensity

- 2:00 a.m. AST (0600 UTC) – Hurricane Bill makes its closest approach to Bermuda, passing roughly 175 mi (280 km) west of the island with winds of 105 mph (170 km/h).
- 2:00 p.m. AST (1800 UTC) – Hurricane Bill weakens to a Category 1 hurricane.

August 23

- 2:00 p.m. AST (1800 UTC) – Hurricane Bill brushes the coastline of Nova Scotia with winds of 80 mph (130 km/h).
- 10:00 p.m. AST (0200 UTC on August 24) – Hurricane Bill weakens to a tropical storm just off the southern coast of Newfoundland
- 11:00 a.m. AST (0300 UTC) – Tropical Storm Bill makes landfall at Point Rosie on the Burin Peninsula of Newfoundland with winds of 70 mph (115 km/h).

August 24

- 8:00 a.m. AST (1200 UTC) – Tropical Storm Bill transitions into an extratropical cyclone over the north Atlantic Ocean as it rapidly tracks eastward towards the United Kingdom.

August 26

- 4:00 a.m. EDT (0900 UTC) – Tropical Storm Danny develops from a disorganized area of low pressure roughly 495 mi (795 km) east of Nassau, Bahamas.
- 7:00 p.m. EDT (0000 UTC on August 27) – Tropical Storm Danny attains its peak intensity with winds of 60 mph (95 km/h) and a minimum pressure of 1006 mbar (hPa; 29.71 inHg).

August 29

- 1:00 a.m. EDT (0600 UTC) – Tropical Storm Danny degenerates into a trough of low pressure shortly before being absorbed by a larger low-pressure system.

=== September ===
September 1

- 2:00 p.m. AST (1800 UTC) – Tropical Storm Erika forms roughly 290 mi (465 km) east of Guadeloupe.
- 8:00 p.m. AST (0000 UTC on September 2) – Tropical Storm Erika attains its peak intensity with winds of 50 mph (80 km/h) and a minimum pressure of 1004 mbar (hPa; 29.65 inHg).

September 2

- 2:30 p.m. AST (1830 UTC) – Tropical Storm Erika passes over the island of Guadeloupe with winds of 40 mph (65 km/h).

September 3

- 2:00 p.m. AST (1800 UTC) – Tropical Storm Erika weakens to a tropical depression.
- 8:00 p.m. AST (0000 UTC on September 4) – Tropical Depression Erika degenerates into a non-covective remnant low over the eastern Caribbean.

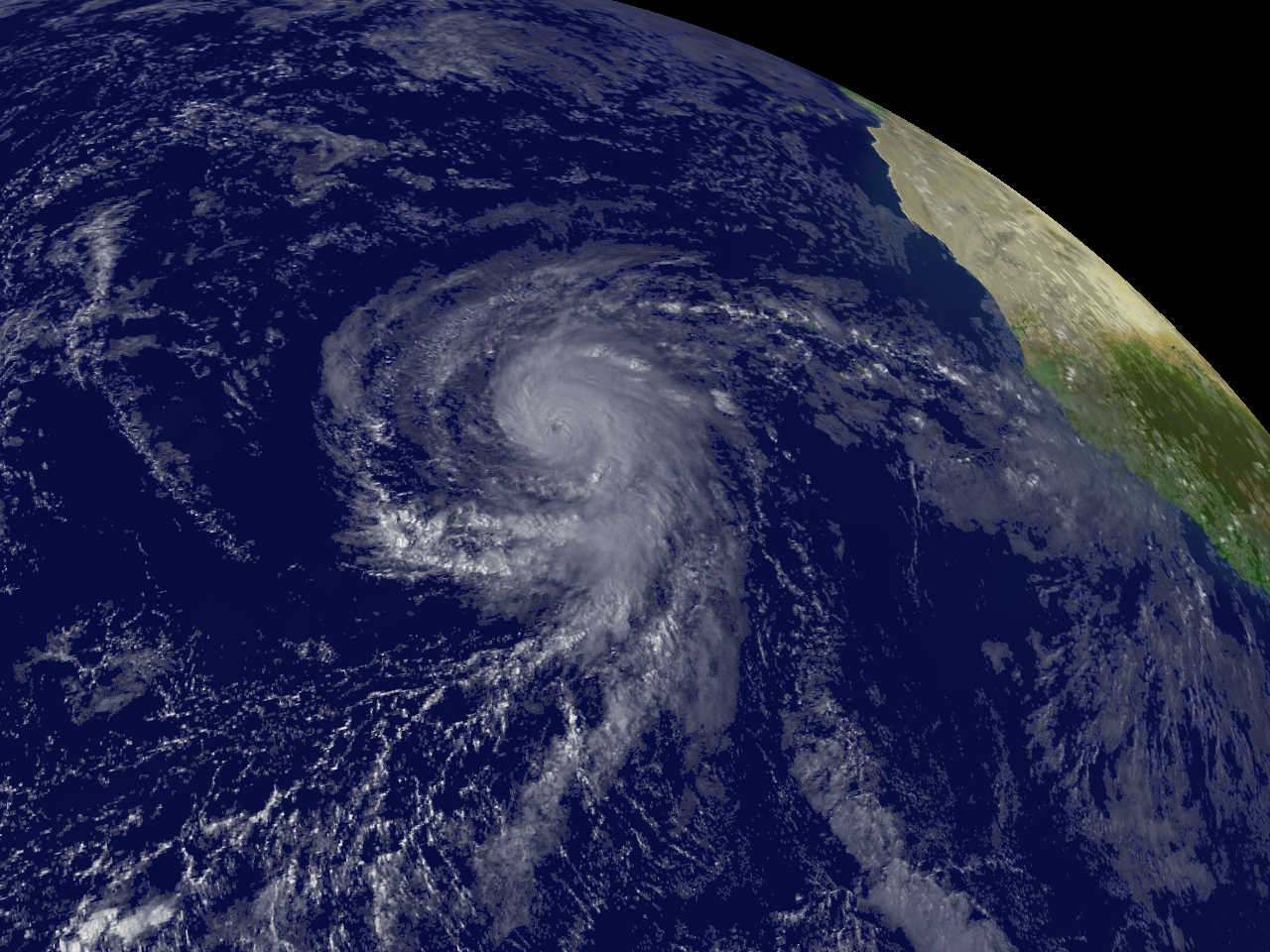
Computer visualization of Hurricane Fred on September 9 showing the storm's proximity to Africa

September 7

- 2:00 p.m. AST (1800 UTC) – Tropical Depression Seven develops out of an area of low pressure roughly 220 mi (355 km) south of Brava, Cape Verde.
- 8:00 p.m. AST (0000 UTC on September 8) – Tropical Depression Seven intensifies into Tropical Storm Fred.

September 8

- 8:00 p.m. AST (0000 UTC on September 9) – Tropical Storm Fred intensifies into a hurricane, the second of the season.

September 9

- 2:00 a.m. AST (0600 UTC) – Hurricane Fred intensifies into a Category 2 hurricane.
- 8:00 a.m. AST (1200 UTC) – Hurricane Fred further intensifies into a Category 3 hurricane and attains its peak intensity with winds of 120 mph (195 km/h) and a minimum pressure of 958 mbar (hPa; 28.29 inHg), becoming the strongest known hurricane on record south of 30°N and east of 35°W.
- 8:00 p.m. AST (0000 UTC on September 10) – Hurricane Fred weakens to a Category 2 hurricane.

September 10

- 2:00 p.m. AST (1800 UTC) – Hurricane Fred weakens to a Category 1 hurricane.

September 11

- 2:00 p.m. AST (1800 UTC) – Hurricane Fred weakens to a tropical storm as it stalls northwest of the Cape Verde Islands.

September 12

- 2:00 p.m. AST (1800 UTC) – Tropical Storm Fred degenerates into a non-convective remnant low roughly 570 mi (915 km) west of Santo Antão, Cape Verde. The remnants of Fred would persist for nearly a week before fully dissipating south of Bermuda on September 19.

September 25

- 2:00 p.m. AST (1800 UTC) – Tropical Depression Eight forms roughly 225 mi (360 km) southwest of the Cape Verde Islands.

September 26

- 2:00 p.m. AST (1800 UTC) – Tropical Depression Eight degenerates into a remnant low west of the Cape Verde Islands.

=== October ===
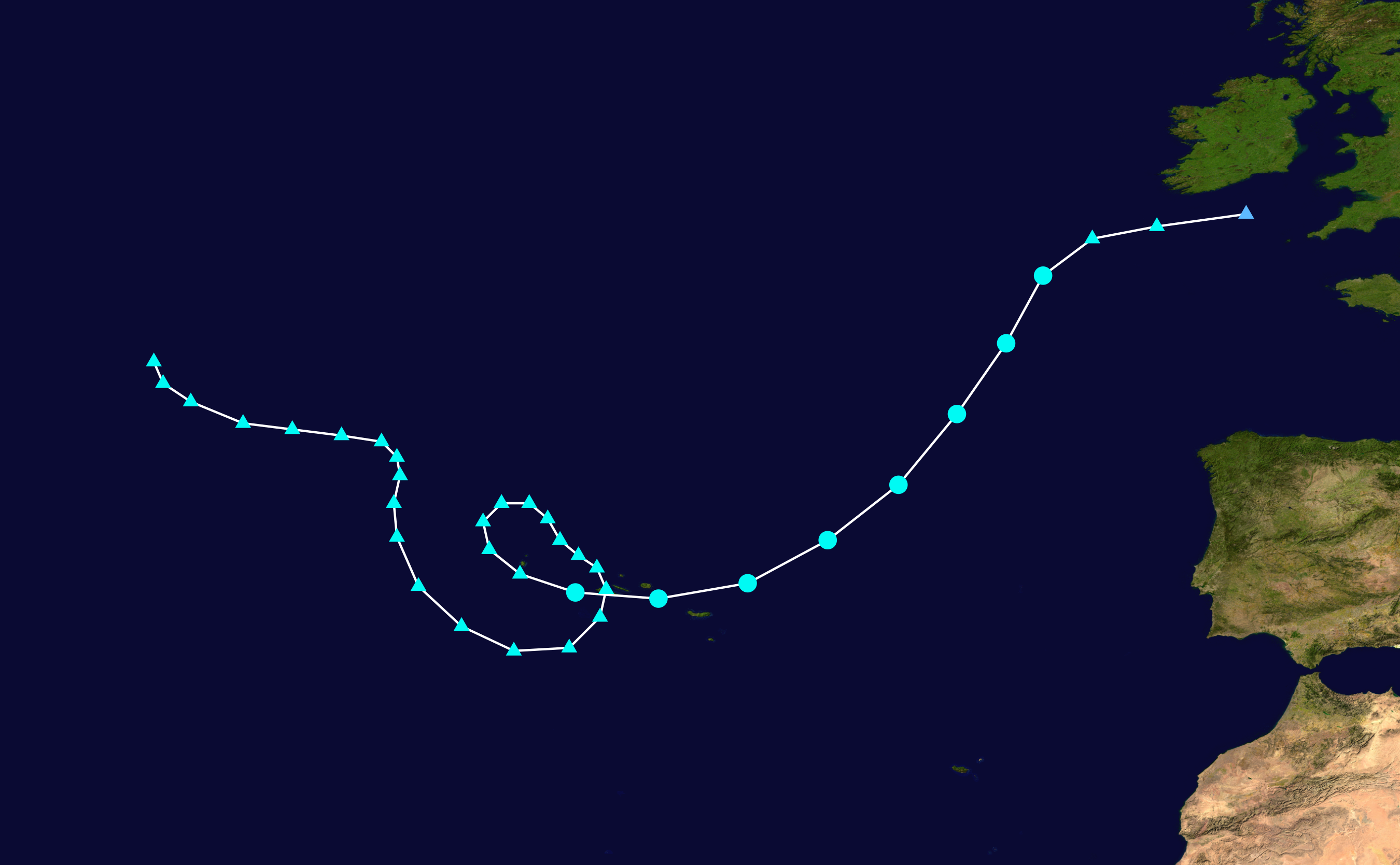
Track of Tropical Storm Grace

October 4

- 2:00 a.m. AST (0600 UTC) – Tropical Storm Grace forms out of an extratropical system roughly 135 mi (215 km) west of Lajes, Azores, becoming the northeasternmost forming cyclone in the Atlantic on record.
- 8:00 p.m. AST (0000 UTC on October 5) – Tropical Storm Grace attains its peak winds of 65 mph (105 km/h).

October 5

- 2:00 p.m. AST (1800 UTC) – Tropical Storm Grace attains its minimum pressure of 986 mbar (hPa; 29.12 inHg).
- 8:00 p.m. AST (0000 UTC on October 6) – The tenth tropical depression of the season forms roughly 775 mi (1,250 km) east of the Lesser Antilles.

October 6

- 2:00 a.m. AST (0600 UTC) – Tropical Storm Grace transitions into an extratropical cyclone roughly 230 mi (370 km) west-southwest of Cork, Ireland.
- 2:00 a.m. AST (0600 UTC) – The tropical depression east of the Lesser Antilles strengthens into Tropical Storm Henri.

October 7

- 2:00 a.m. AST (0600 UTC) – Tropical Storm Henri attains its peak intensity with winds of 50 mph (80 km/h) and a minimum pressure of 1005 mbar (hPa; 29.68 inHg).

October 8

- 2:00 a.m. AST (0600 UTC) – Tropical Storm Henri weakens to a tropical depression.
- 2:00 p.m. AST (1800 UTC) – Tropical Depression Henri degenerates into a remnant low roughly 155 mi (250 km) north of Anguilla.

=== November ===
November 4

- 12:00 a.m. CDT (0600 UTC) – Tropical Depression Eleven forms over the southwestern Caribbean Sea near San Andres Island.
- 6:00 a.m. CDT (1200 UTC) – Tropical Depression Eleven intensifies into Tropical Storm Ida.

November 5

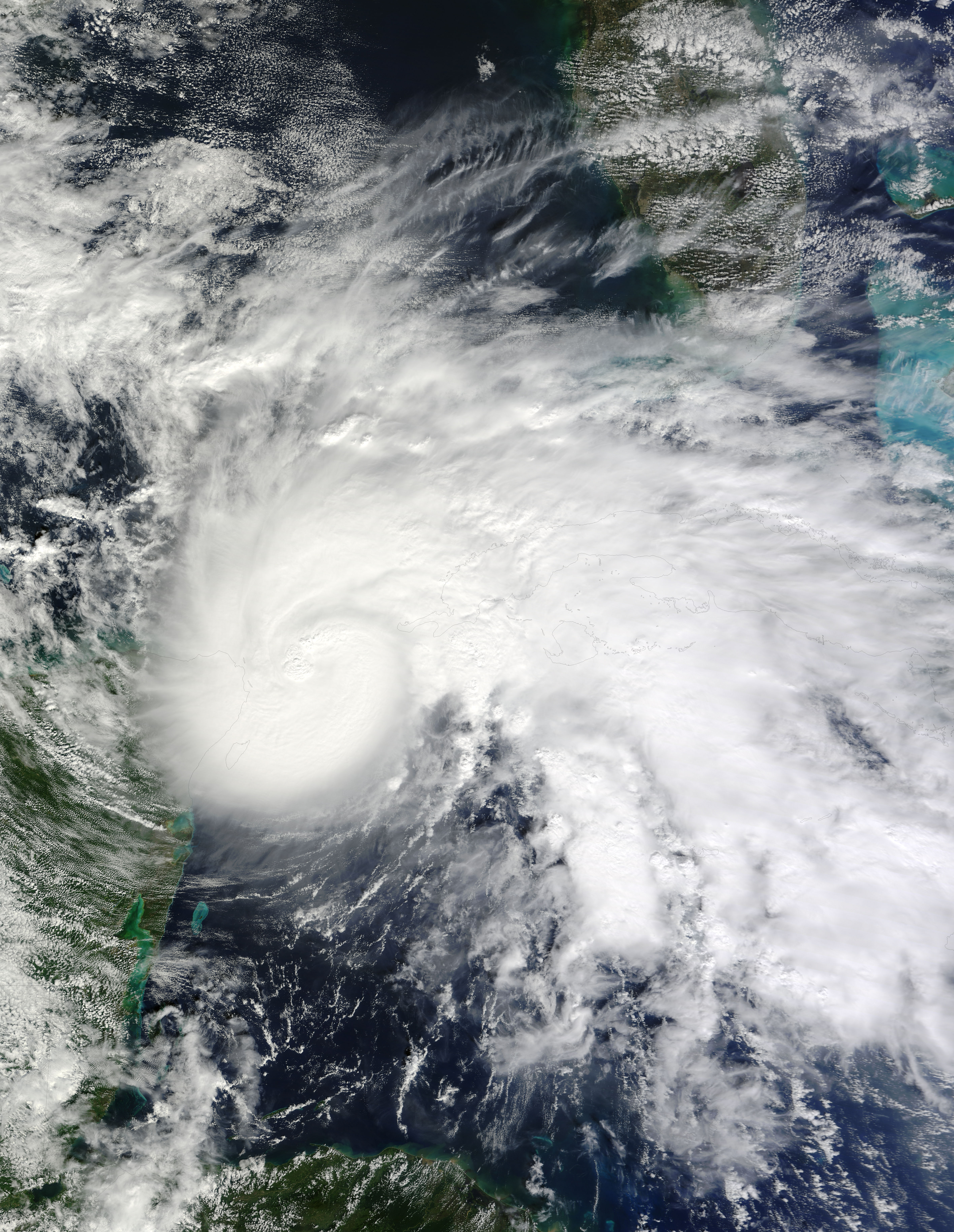
Hurricane Ida over the Yucatán Channel near peak intensity on November 8

- 12:00 a.m. CDT (0600 UTC) – Tropical Storm Ida strengthens into a Category 1 hurricane as it passes near the Corn Islands with winds of 75 mph (120 km/h).
- 6:00 a.m. CDT (1200 UTC) – Hurricane Ida makes landfall near Rio Grande, Nicaragua with winds of 80 mph (130 km/h).
- 12:00 p.m. CDT (1800 UTC) – Hurricane Ida weakens into a tropical storm over the high terrain of Nicaragua.

November 6

- 12:00 a.m. CDT (0600 UTC) – Tropical Storm Ida further weakens to a tropical depression as it nears Honduras.

November 7

- 12:00 a.m. CDT (0600 UTC) – Tropical Depression Ida restrengthens into a tropical storm after moving over the warm waters of the northwestern Caribbean Sea.
- 6:00 p.m. CDT (0000 UTC on November 8) – Tropical Storm Ida regains hurricane status.

November 8

- 6:00 a.m. CDT (1200 UTC) – Hurricane Ida intensifies into a Category 2 hurricane.
- 12:00 p.m. CDT (1800 UTC) – Hurricane Ida attains its minimum pressure of 975 mbar (hPa; 28.79 inHg).
- 6:00 p.m. CDT (0000 UTC on November 9) – Hurricane Ida attains its peak winds of 105 mph (170 km/h) over the Yucatán Channel.

November 9

- 12:00 a.m. CDT (0600 UTC) – Hurricane Ida weakens to a Category 1 hurricane.
- 6:00 a.m. CDT (1200 UTC) – Hurricane Ida quickly weakens to a tropical storm.
- 12:00 p.m. CDT (1800 UTC) – Tropical Storm Ida regains hurricane status for a third time.
- 3:00 p.m. CDT (2100 UTC) – Hurricane Ida attains its secondary peak intensity with winds of 85 mph (135 km/h).
- 6:00 p.m. CDT (0000 UTC) – Hurricane Ida weakens to a tropical storm as it nears the United States Gulf Coast.

November 10

- 3:00 a.m. CDT (0900 UTC) – Tropical Storm Ida transitions into an extratropical cyclone just before moving inland over southern Alabama.

November 30

- The 2009 Atlantic hurricane season officially ends.

== See also ==
- Lists of Atlantic hurricanes
- Timeline of the 2009 Pacific hurricane season
