= List of storms named Ana =

The name Ana has been used for eleven tropical cyclones worldwide: eight in the Atlantic Ocean, one in the Central Pacific Ocean, one in the South Pacific Ocean, and one in the South-West Indian Ocean. Ana has also been used for two European windstorms.

In the Atlantic:

- Tropical Storm Ana (1979) – the first June Atlantic storm since 1933 to develop east of the Lesser Antilles.
- Tropical Storm Ana (1985) – affected Atlantic Canada.
- Tropical Storm Ana (1991) – dropped precipitation in Florida prior to becoming tropical.
- Tropical Storm Ana (1997) – resulted in multiple sea rescues in North Carolina.
- Tropical Storm Ana (2003) – the first recorded Atlantic tropical storm to form and receive a name in April.
- Tropical Storm Ana (2009) – degenerated into a remnant low in the middle of its tropical lifespan.
- Tropical Storm Ana (2015) – the earliest-landfalling United States tropical cyclone.
- Tropical Storm Ana (2021) – formed in an area with no other recorded May tropical storm formation since 1950.

In the Central Pacific:

- Hurricane Ana (2014) – a Category 1 hurricane that became the longest-lived Central Pacific hurricane to remain within the region.

In the South Pacific:

- Cyclone Ana (2021) – a Category 3 severe tropical cyclone that caused extensive damage in Fiji.

After its only South Pacific usage, the name Ana was retired from the basin's naming lists, being replaced by Aru.

In the South-West Indian:

- Tropical Storm Ana (2022) – caused over 100 fatalities across Madagascar, Malawi, and Mozambique.

In Europe:

- Storm Ana (2017) – the first cyclone to be officially named by France, Portugal, or Spain during a windstorm season.
- Storm Ana (2022) – caused 12 fatalities in Italy.

== See also ==
Storms with similar names:

- Cyclone Anais (2012) – the earliest intense tropical cyclone on record in the South-West Indian Ocean.
- Cyclone Anatol (1999) – a European windstorm that affected Denmark, Germany, and Sweden, causing over 800 injuries.
- Cyclone Anja (2009) – a South-West Indian Ocean tropical cyclone that did not affect land.
- Storm Dorothea (2024) – a European windstorm named Anka by the Free University of Berlin.
- Cyclone Asna (2024) – a North Indian Ocean tropical cyclone that affected India and Pakistan.
