= Tropical Storm Ana (2009) =

Atlantic tropical storm

- Ana shortly after being upgraded to a tropical storm on August 12

Meteorological history
- Formed: August 11, 2009
- Dissipated: August 16, 2009

Tropical storm
- 1-minute sustained (SSHWS/NWS)
- Highest winds: 40 mph (65 km/h)
- Lowest pressure: 1003 mbar (hPa); 29.62 inHg

Overall effects
- Fatalities: None reported
- Damage: Minimal
- Areas affected: Lesser Antilles, Puerto Rico, Hispaniola, Cuba and The Bahamas
- IBTrACS
- Part of the 2009 Atlantic hurricane season

Tropical Storm Ana was the latest forming first named storm in the Atlantic since Tropical Storm Arthur in 1984. Forming out of an area of low pressure associated with a tropical wave on August 11, Ana briefly attained tropical storm intensity on August 12 before weakening back to a depression. The following day, the system degenerated into a non-convective remnant low as it tracked westward. On August 14, the depression regenerated roughly 1,075 mi (1,730 km) east of the Leeward Islands. Early on August 15, the storm re-attained tropical storm status, at which time it was named Ana. After reaching a peak intensity with winds of 40 mph (64 km/h) and a barometric pressure of 1,003 mbar (1,003 hPa; 29.6 inHg), the storm began to weaken again due to increasing levels of wind shear and the unusually fast movement of Ana. In post-storm analysis, it was discovered that Ana had degenerated into a tropical wave once more on August 16, before reaching any landmasses.

Numerous tropical storm watches were issued for the Lesser Antilles, Puerto Rico, Dominican Republic between August 15 and 17. Several islands took minor precautions for the storm, including St. Croix which evacuated 40 residents from flood-prone areas ahead of the storm. In the Dominican Republic, officials took preparations by setting up relief agencies and setting up shelters. Impact from Ana was minimal, mainly consisting of light to moderate rainfall. In Puerto Rico, up to 2.76 in (70 mm) of rain was reported, causing street flooding and forcing the evacuation of three schools.

== Meteorological history ==
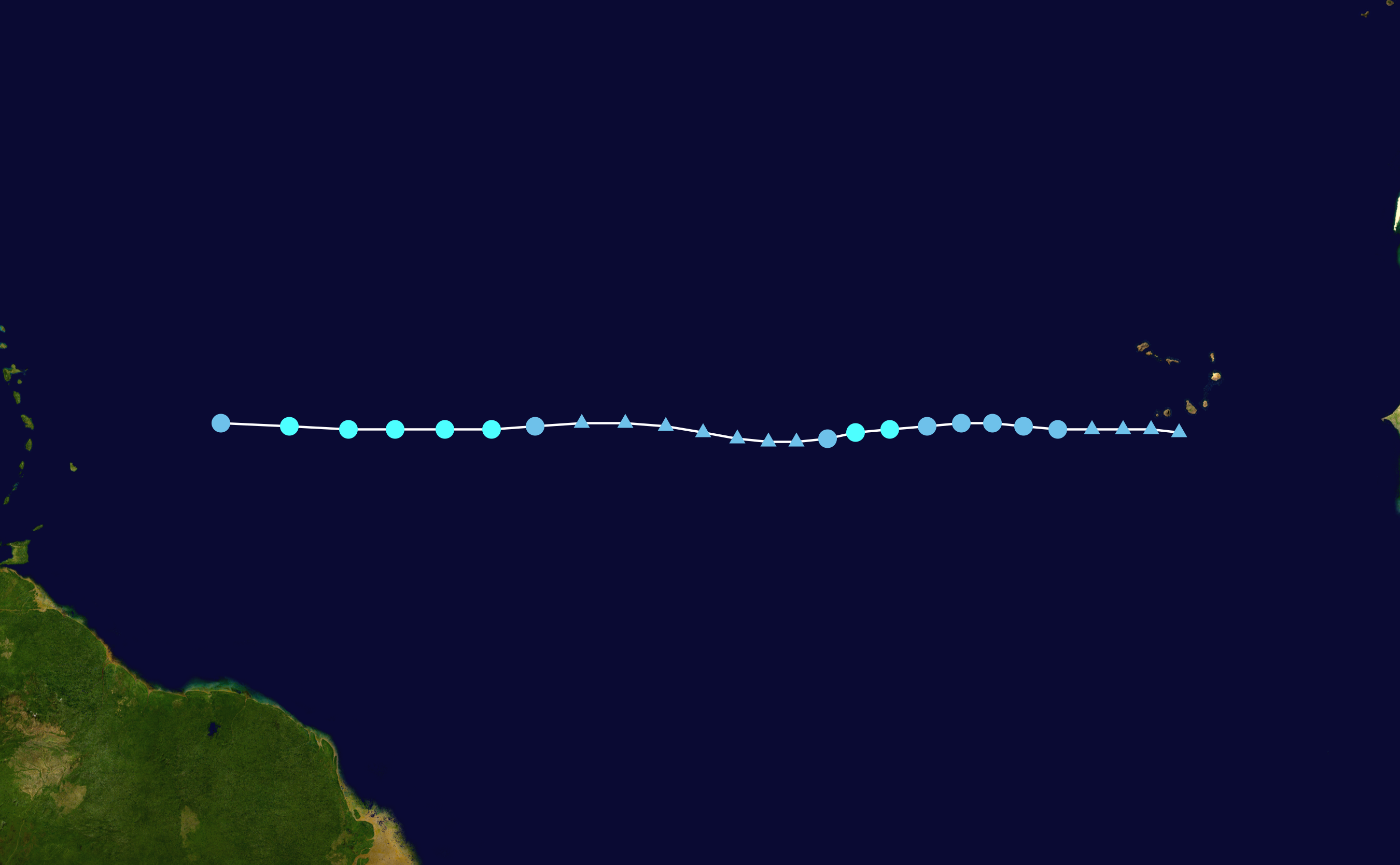
Map plotting the storm's track and intensity, according to the Saffir–Simpson scale Map key Saffir–Simpson scale Tropical depression (≤38 mph, ≤62 km/h) Tropical storm (39–73 mph, 63–118 km/h) Category 1 (74–95 mph, 119–153 km/h) Category 2 (96–110 mph, 154–177 km/h) Category 3 (111–129 mph, 178–208 km/h) Category 4 (130–156 mph, 209–251 km/h) Category 5 (≥157 mph, ≥252 km/h) Unknown Storm type Tropical cyclone Subtropical cyclone Extratropical cyclone, remnant low, tropical disturbance, or monsoon depression

On August 9, the National Hurricane Center (NHC) began monitoring a tropical wave associated with a small area of convective activity between the Cape Verde Islands and the western coast of Africa. The system eventually spawned an area of low pressure as it tracked towards the west. After slowly organising for a few days, the NHC reported early on August 11, that the system had developed into a tropical depression. The system at this time was located about 280 mi (450 km), west of the Cape Verde Islands. The depression developed deep convection around the center of circulation and continued to track generally towards the west in response to a mid-level subtropical ridge to the north. The depression was expected to gradually intensify as it moved over marginally warm sea surface temperatures and into an area of low wind shear; however it was anticipated that dry air would hamper the depressions chances of intensifying further.

By August 12, the NHC reported that Tropical Depression Two was near tropical storm intensity after a burst of deep convection over the center. At this point, the system was not upgraded to a tropical storm; however, in a post-storm analysis, it was determined that the system had attained tropical storm-force winds, peaking at 40 mph (64 km/h) for 12 hours on August 12. Several hours later, the system became disorganized due to increased wind shear. By the afternoon of August 13, the system had weakened to a tropical depression and shortly thereafter, degenerated into a non-convective remnant low-pressure area as it failed to maintain convection around the center for 24 hours. At this time, the NHC issued their final advisory on the system but noted that there was the possibility of regeneration.

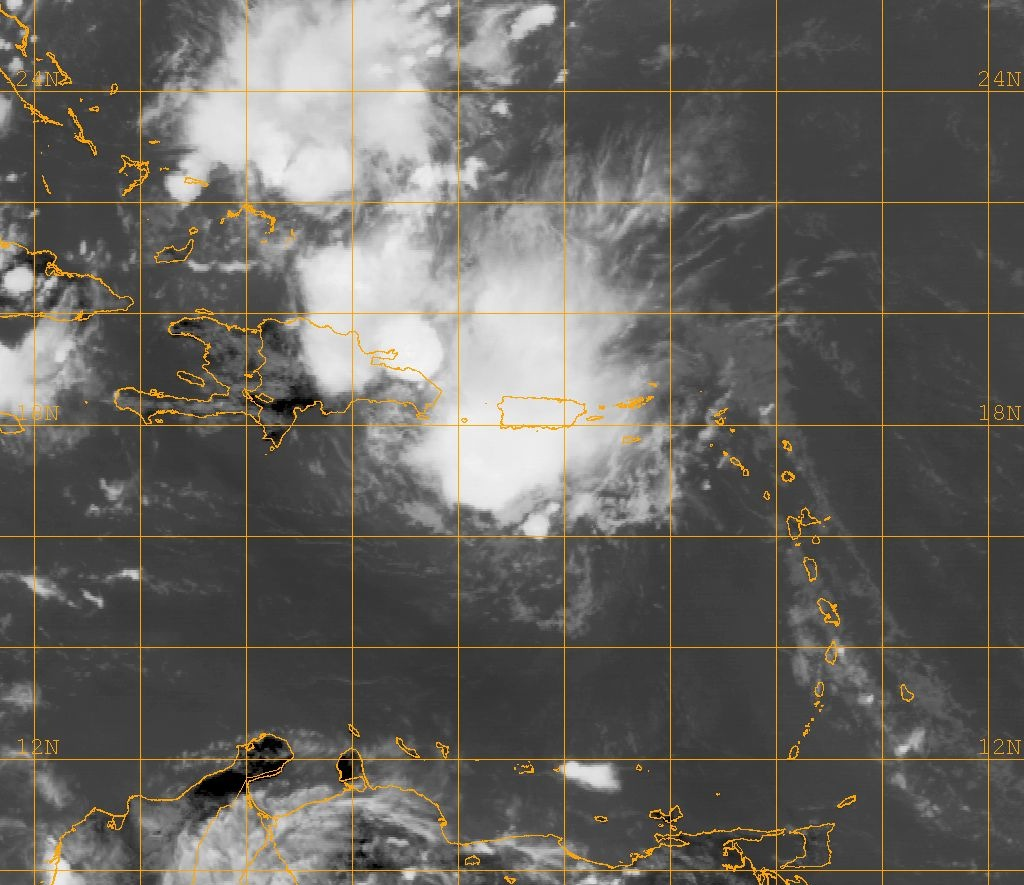
Remnants of Ana near Puerto Rico on August 17

On August 14, roughly 24 hours after degenerating into a remnant low, convection began to redevelop over the system. Later that day, a Hurricane Hunter reconnaissance plane deployed dropsondes into the system. They found that the system was regenerating and shortly after, the NHC began re-issuing advisories on the depression when it was located roughly 1,075 mi (1,730 km) east of the Leeward Islands. The depression continued to track westward in response to an upper-level high over the north Atlantic. Early on August 15, the NHC upgraded the depression to a tropical storm, giving it the name Ana as deep convection developed around the center of circulation. Later that day, wind shear caused convection to become displaced from the circulation, exposing the center of Ana again.

By August 16, the forward motion of Ana began to increase, and the storm quickly entered a region of dry, stable air. By the afternoon, a Hurricane Hunter reconnaissance mission did not find any evidence of tropical storm-force winds, resulting in Ana being downgraded to a tropical depression. It was determined in post-storm analysis, that Ana had degenerated into a tropical wave shortly afterwards, and was no longer a tropical cyclone. Several hours later, the system redeveloped convection as it raced towards the west-northwest at 26 mph (42 km/h). Early on August 17, radar imagery from Guadeloupe and San Juan, Puerto Rico depicted a system without a closed, low-level circulation. Despite this, the NHC continued operational advisories until confirmation could be made with visible satellite imagery. Later that day, a final reconnaissance plane flew into the storm and did not find a low-level circulation. Following this, the NHC stated that Ana had dissipated off the coast of Puerto Rico, despite having already degenerated into a tropical wave the previous day. The remnants of Ana were once more monitored for signs of regeneration, but land interaction with Hispaniola and Cuba destroyed any chance of redevelopment.

== Preparations and impact ==
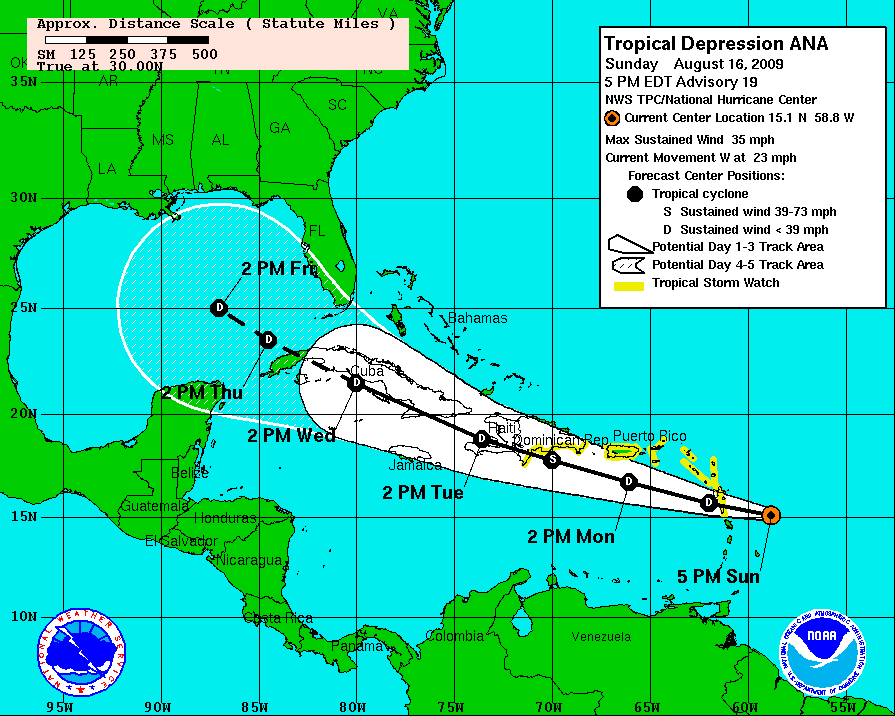
Forecast track for Ana on August 16 and tropical storm watches at the 19th advisory

On August 15, a tropical storm watch was issued for much of the Leeward Islands. Two days later, the watch was expanded to include Puerto Rico and areas in the eastern Dominican Republic between Cabo Engaño and Cabo Beata. As Ana weakened and dissipated, the watches were discontinued.

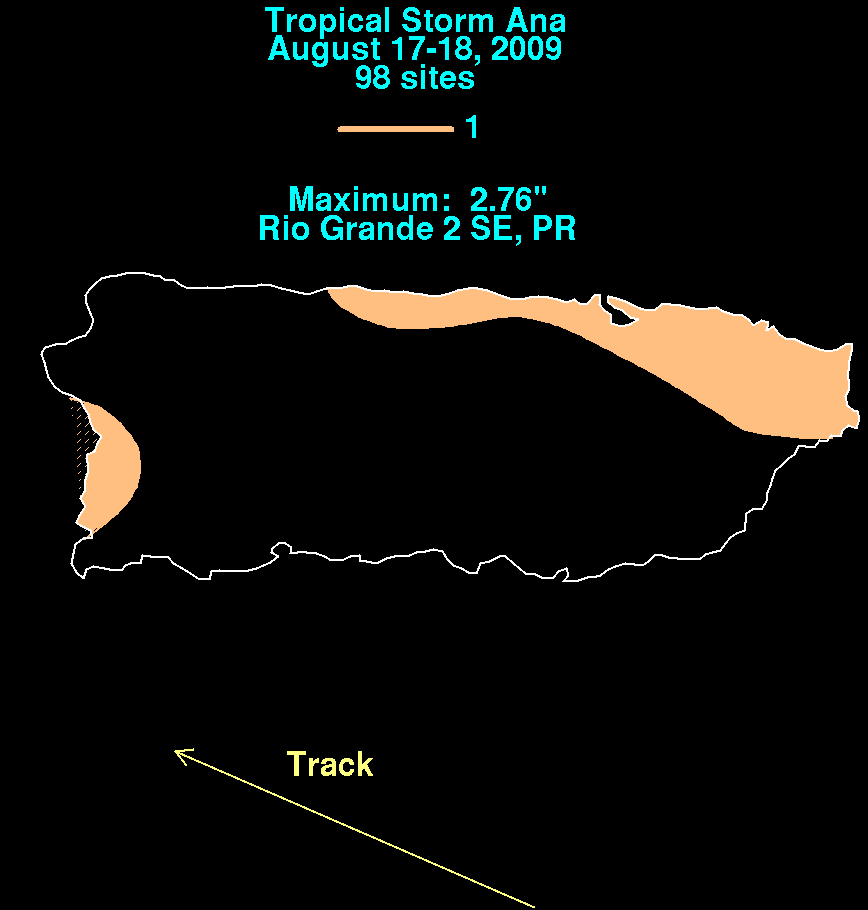
Map of rainfall from Ana in Puerto Rico

In Saint Maarten, cruise agencies redirected ships to avoid the storm and secured vessels docked at port. Several ships were moved to Simpson Bay Lagoon where waves are generally small. In St. Kitts, officials evacuated 40 families in flood-prone areas to shelters ahead of the storm. On August 17, the National Weather Service in San Juan, Puerto Rico issued an Urban and Small Stream Flood Advisory for all of the eastern municipalities on the island. Flights in the area were delayed by several hours to avoid the depression. In the Dominican Republic, officials posted flood alerts for 12 provinces as the remnants of Ana were forecast to produce up to 6 in (150 mm) of rain in the country. General Luna Paulino of the civil army activated relief agencies ahead of the storm and notified residents of possible mandatory evacuations. Officials inspected the dams threatened by the storm to protect several towns and villages. Emergency officials stated that roughly 35,000 personnel were on standby in case of a disaster. Shelters were also prepped throughout the country; however, these were not opened and the residents who had voluntarily evacuated had returned home by the afternoon of August 17. In nearby Haiti, officials placed the country under yellow alert as the remnants of Ana could produce heavy rainfall over mountainous areas.

In St. Thomas, sustained winds reached 28 mph (45 km/h) and gusts peaked at 40 mph (64 km/h). In Puerto Rico, rainfall was limited due to the storms' fast motion, triggering minor flooding but little damage. A maximum of 2.76 in (70 mm) of rain fell in Río Grande. The rains caused the Río Fajardo to rise, resulting in the issuance of an alert as officials warned it could overflow its banks. Several streets were temporarily shut down due to flooding, including one tunnel, and three schools had to be evacuated. Throughout the island, roughly 6,000 people were left without power as numerous branches were snapped off trees and knocked down power lines. There were also reports of waterspouts and tornadoes associated with Ana in Puerto Rico. Winds on the island gusted up to 42 mph (68 km/h). The remnants of Ana produced widespread rainfall across Hispaniola.

== See also ==
- Other storms of the same name
- Timeline of the 2009 Atlantic hurricane season
- Hurricane Lee (2017) – Another storm that degenerated into a low and regenerated into a tropical cyclone
