= WABO-FM =

- Waynesboro, Mississippi; United States
- Frequency: 105.5 MHz
- Branding: Waybo Radio

Programming
- Format: Variety hits

Ownership
- Owner: James Heathcock, Jr.; (Heathcock Communications, LLC)
- Sister stations: WABO

History
- First air date: 1973
- Former call signs: WABO (1979)

Technical information
- Licensing authority: FCC
- Facility ID: 40489
- Class: A
- ERP: 6,000 watts
- HAAT: 44 meters
- Transmitter coordinates: 31°40′48″N 88°40′34″W

Links
- Public license information: Public file; LMS
- Webcast: Listen Live
- Website: wabo105.com

WABO-FM (105.5 MHz) is a radio station broadcasting a variety hits format. Licensed to Waynesboro, Mississippi, United States, the station is currently owned by Jamie Heathcock, through licensee Heathcock Communications, LLC.

== History ==
The station went on the air as WABO-FM on 1979-02-01.
