= Eret, Mississippi =

- Unincorporated community
- Location of Eret in Mississippi
- Coordinates: 31°28′13″N 88°28′56″W
- Country: United States
- State: Mississippi
- County: Wayne
- Elevation: 194 ft (59 m)
- Time zone: UTC-6 (Central (CST))
  - Summer (DST): UTC-5 (CDT)
- Area codes: 601 & 769
- GNIS feature ID: 691847
- Other name: Pine Bluff

Eret is an unincorporated community in Wayne County, Mississippi, United States.

The town was named for the late wife of Fred Clark, who owned most of the land in the area.

Eret was located on the Mobile and Ohio Railroad, built through Mississippi in the 1850s. The town never had a post office, and never incorporated.
