= WABO (AM) =

Simulcasting WABO-FM Waynesboro
- Waynesboro, Mississippi; United States
- Frequency: 990 kHz
- Branding: Waybo Radio

Programming
- Format: Variety hits

Ownership
- Owner: James Heathcock, Jr.; (Heathcock Communications, LLC)

History
- First air date: 1954
- Call sign meaning: WAynesBOro

Technical information
- Licensing authority: FCC
- Facility ID: 40488
- Class: D
- Power: 1,000 watts day 100 watts night
- Transmitter coordinates: 31°40′48″N 88°40′34″W

Links
- Public license information: Public file; LMS
- Webcast: Listen Live
- Website: wabo105.com

WABO (990 kHz, "Waybo Radio") is an AM radio station licensed to serve Waynesboro, Mississippi. The station is owned by James Heathcock Jr., through licensee Heathcock Communications, LLC. It airs a variety hits format, simulcasting WABO-FM 105.5 Waynesboro.

The station has been assigned this call sign by the Federal Communications Commission since it was initially licensed.
