= Wayne County School District (Mississippi) =

School district in Mississippi, United States

Address
- 810 Chickasawhay Street Waynesboro, Mississippi, 39367; United States

District information
- Type: Public
- Grades: K–12
- NCES District ID: 2804530

Students and staff
- Students: 2,927
- Teachers: 215.72
- Staff: 241.23
- Student–teacher ratio: 13.57

Other information
- Website: www.wcsdms.com

The Wayne County School District is a public school district based in Waynesboro, Mississippi (USA). The district's boundaries parallel that of Wayne County.

== Schools ==
- Wayne County High School
- Waynesboro Middle School (Grades 5-8)
- Waynesboro Elementary School (Grades K-4)
- Beat Four Elementary School (Grades K-8)
- Buckatunna Elementary School (Grades K-8)
- Clara Elementary School (Grades K-8)

== Demographics ==
=== 2006-07 school year ===
There were a total of 3,896 students enrolled in the Wayne County School District during the 2006–2007 school year. The gender makeup of the district was 51% female and 49% male. The racial makeup of the district was 54.36% African American, 45.07% White, 0.23% Hispanic, 0.21% Asian, and 0.13% Native American. 65.5% of the district's students were eligible to receive free lunch.

=== Previous school years ===
| School Year | Enrollment | Gender Makeup | | Racial Makeup | | | | |
| School Year | Enrollment | Female | Male | Asian | African American | Hispanic | Native American | White |
|---|---|---|---|---|---|---|---|---|
| 2005-06 | 4054 | 50% | 50% | 0.23% | 53.59% | 0.08% | 0% | 45.97% |
| 2004-05 | 3,924 | 50% | 50% | 0.23% | 53.59% | 0.08% | 0.13% | 45.97% |
| 2003-04 | 3,969 | 50% | 50% | 0.25% | 53.14% | 0.10% | 0.13% | 46.38% |
| 2002-03 | 3,941 | 50% | 50% | 0.28% | 52.91% | 0.15% | 0.10% | 46.56% |

== Accountability statistics ==
| | 2006-07 | 2005-06 | 2004-05 | 2003-04 | 2002-03 |
|---|---|---|---|---|---|
| District Accreditation Status | Accredited | Accredited | Accredited | Accredited | Accredited |
School Performance Classifications
| Level 5 (Superior Performing) Schools | 3 | 3 | 3 | 2 | 2 |
| Level 4 (Exemplary) Schools | 0 | 0 | 1 | 0 | 2 |
| Level 3 (Successful) Schools | 3 | 3 | 2 | 3 | 2 |
| Level 2 (Under Performing) Schools | 0 | 0 | 0 | 1 | 0 |
| Level 1 (Low Performing) Schools | 0 | 0 | 0 | 0 | 0 |
| Not Assigned | 0 | 0 | 0 | 0 | 0 |

== See also ==
- List of school districts in Mississippi
