= Waynesboro, Mississippi =

- City
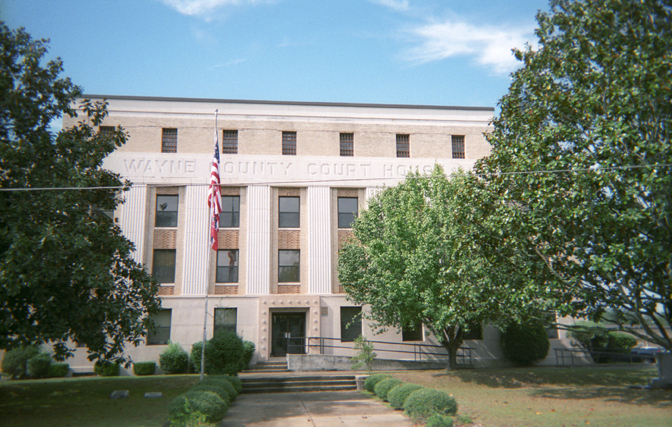
- Wayne County Courthouse in Waynesboro

- Flag Seal

- Location of Waynesboro, Mississippi

- Location in the United States
- Coordinates: 31°40′26″N 88°38′37″W
- Country: United States
- State: Mississippi
- County: Wayne

Area
  - Total: 12.70 sq mi (32.90 km^{2})
  - Land: 12.69 sq mi (32.87 km^{2})
  - Water: 0.0077 sq mi (0.02 km^{2})
- Elevation: 190 ft (58 m)

Population (2020)
  - Total: 4,567
  - Density: 359.8/sq mi (138.92/km^{2})
- Time zone: UTC-6 (Central (CST))
  - Summer (DST): UTC-5 (CDT)
- ZIP code: 39367
- Area code: 601
- FIPS code: 28-78360
- GNIS feature ID: 0690942
- Website: http://waynesboroms.us/

Waynesboro (/ˈweɪnzbʌroʊ/) is a city in Wayne County, Mississippi, United States. As of the 2020 census, Waynesboro had a population of 4,567. It is the county seat of Wayne County.

== History ==
In 1854, the Mobile and Ohio Railroad was built through Wayne County, and Waynesboro Station was built about five miles north of Winchester. Around Waynesboro Station, the railroad laid the future town of Waynesboro and sold property. In 1867, Waynesboro replaced Winchester as the county seat.

The discovery of oil in Wayne County during the 1940s drove an economic and population boom. In the 1940s, Waynesboro's population more than doubled, increasing from 1,445 residents in 1940 to 3,442 residents in 1950.

Two radio stations are licensed to Waynesboro. WABO (AM) began broadcasting in 1954 and WABO-FM in 1973.

== Geography ==
Waynesboro is located at 31°40′26″N 88°38′37″W (31.674026, -88.643553), just east of the Chickasawhay River.

According to the United States Census Bureau, the city has a total area of 6.7 square miles (17 km^{2}), of which 6.7 square miles (17 km^{2}) is land and 0.15% is water.

=== Climate ===
Waynesboro has a humid subtropical climate (Köppen: Cfa) with long, hot summers and short, mild winters. The record high of 106 °F (41 °C) was recorded on July 14 and 15, 1980 and August 27, 2023, and the record low of −2 °F (−19 °C) was recorded on February 13, 1899. The average date of first frost is November 7, and the average date of last frost is March 16. This gives it a frost-free season length of 235 days. Waynesboro averages 47.6 nights at or below freezing annually. The record one day snowfall of 10.0 inches (25 cm) fell on December 31, 1963.

Climate data for Waynesboro, Mississippi (1991–2020 normals, extremes 1892–1929, 1954–present)
| Month | Jan | Feb | Mar | Apr | May | Jun | Jul | Aug | Sep | Oct | Nov | Dec | Year |
|---|---|---|---|---|---|---|---|---|---|---|---|---|---|
| Record high °F (°C) | 85 (29) | 88 (31) | 90 (32) | 96 (36) | 101 (38) | 105 (41) | 106 (41) | 106 (41) | 105 (41) | 99 (37) | 89 (32) | 85 (29) | 106 (41) |
| Mean maximum °F (°C) | 75.4 (24.1) | 79.1 (26.2) | 84.4 (29.1) | 87.1 (30.6) | 92.4 (33.6) | 95.8 (35.4) | 97.4 (36.3) | 97.5 (36.4) | 94.9 (34.9) | 89.9 (32.2) | 82.0 (27.8) | 77.0 (25.0) | 98.6 (37.0) |
| Mean daily maximum °F (°C) | 59.2 (15.1) | 63.4 (17.4) | 70.7 (21.5) | 77.3 (25.2) | 84.4 (29.1) | 89.8 (32.1) | 91.8 (33.2) | 91.8 (33.2) | 87.6 (30.9) | 78.9 (26.1) | 68.4 (20.2) | 61.1 (16.2) | 77.0 (25.0) |
| Daily mean °F (°C) | 47.7 (8.7) | 51.1 (10.6) | 58.0 (14.4) | 64.6 (18.1) | 72.3 (22.4) | 79.0 (26.1) | 81.3 (27.4) | 81.0 (27.2) | 76.3 (24.6) | 65.8 (18.8) | 55.2 (12.9) | 49.5 (9.7) | 65.1 (18.4) |
| Mean daily minimum °F (°C) | 36.1 (2.3) | 38.8 (3.8) | 45.3 (7.4) | 52.0 (11.1) | 60.2 (15.7) | 68.2 (20.1) | 70.8 (21.6) | 70.3 (21.3) | 65.0 (18.3) | 52.8 (11.6) | 42.1 (5.6) | 37.9 (3.3) | 53.3 (11.8) |
| Mean minimum °F (°C) | 19.1 (−7.2) | 23.2 (−4.9) | 28.2 (−2.1) | 35.0 (1.7) | 45.0 (7.2) | 58.6 (14.8) | 64.9 (18.3) | 62.3 (16.8) | 51.0 (10.6) | 35.3 (1.8) | 26.1 (−3.3) | 23.3 (−4.8) | 17.3 (−8.2) |
| Record low °F (°C) | 0 (−18) | −2 (−19) | 14 (−10) | 26 (−3) | 35 (2) | 42 (6) | 52 (11) | 51 (11) | 32 (0) | 24 (−4) | 14 (−10) | 5 (−15) | −2 (−19) |
| Average precipitation inches (mm) | 6.06 (154) | 5.15 (131) | 5.87 (149) | 4.92 (125) | 4.52 (115) | 5.88 (149) | 5.37 (136) | 4.41 (112) | 4.06 (103) | 3.55 (90) | 4.25 (108) | 6.01 (153) | 60.05 (1,525) |
| Average snowfall inches (cm) | 0.1 (0.25) | 0.0 (0.0) | 0.5 (1.3) | 0.0 (0.0) | 0.0 (0.0) | 0.0 (0.0) | 0.0 (0.0) | 0.0 (0.0) | 0.0 (0.0) | 0.0 (0.0) | 0.0 (0.0) | 0.0 (0.0) | 0.6 (1.5) |
| Average precipitation days (≥ 0.01 in) | 9.4 | 8.2 | 8.2 | 7.0 | 7.9 | 9.8 | 10.9 | 9.2 | 6.9 | 5.3 | 6.8 | 8.5 | 98.1 |
| Average snowy days (≥ 0.1 in) | 0.0 | 0.0 | 0.0 | 0.0 | 0.0 | 0.0 | 0.0 | 0.0 | 0.0 | 0.0 | 0.0 | 0.1 | 0.1 |
Source: NOAA

== Demographics ==
Historical population
| Census | Pop. | Note | %± |
|---|---|---|---|
| 1880 | 156 | | — |
| 1890 | 458 | | 193.6% |
| 1900 | 436 | | −4.8% |
| 1910 | 652 | | 49.5% |
| 1920 | 689 | | 5.7% |
| 1930 | 1,120 | | 62.6% |
| 1940 | 1,445 | | 29.0% |
| 1950 | 3,442 | | 138.2% |
| 1960 | 3,892 | | 13.1% |
| 1970 | 4,368 | | 12.2% |
| 1980 | 5,349 | | 22.5% |
| 1990 | 5,143 | | −3.9% |
| 2000 | 5,197 | | 1.0% |
| 2010 | 5,043 | | −3.0% |
| 2020 | 4,567 | | −9.4% |
U.S. Decennial Census

=== 2020 census ===
As of the 2020 census, Waynesboro had a population of 4,567. The median age was 39.0 years. 24.0% of residents were under the age of 18 and 17.4% of residents were 65 years of age or older. For every 100 females there were 83.4 males, and for every 100 females age 18 and over there were 78.2 males age 18 and over.

0.0% of residents lived in urban areas, while 100.0% lived in rural areas.

There were 1,893 households in Waynesboro, of which 31.5% had children under the age of 18 living in them. Of all households, 29.1% were married-couple households, 21.1% were households with a male householder and no spouse or partner present, and 44.5% were households with a female householder and no spouse or partner present. About 34.0% of all households were made up of individuals and 13.0% had someone living alone who was 65 years of age or older.

There were 2,177 housing units, of which 13.0% were vacant. The homeowner vacancy rate was 2.5% and the rental vacancy rate was 9.6%.

Racial composition as of the 2020 census
| Race | Number | Percent |
|---|---|---|
| White | 1,379 | 30.2% |
| Black or African American | 2,900 | 63.5% |
| American Indian and Alaska Native | 7 | 0.2% |
| Asian | 18 | 0.4% |
| Native Hawaiian and Other Pacific Islander | 1 | 0.0% |
| Some other race | 154 | 3.4% |
| Two or more races | 108 | 2.4% |
| Hispanic or Latino (of any race) | 208 | 4.6% |

=== 2010 census ===
As of the 2010 United States census, there were 5,043 people living in the city. 61.9% were African American, 35.2% White, 0.2% Native American, 0.3% Asian, 0.1% Pacific Islander, 1.4% from some other race and 1.0% of two or more races. 1.9% were Hispanic or Latino of any race.

=== 2000 census ===
As of the census of 2000, there were 5,197 people, 1,982 households, and 1,335 families living in the city. The population density was 781.6 inhabitants per square mile (301.8/km^{2}). There were 2,276 housing units at an average density of 342.3 per square mile (132.2/km^{2}). The racial makeup of the city was 41.54% White, 57.28% African American, 0.21% Native American, 0.37% Asian, 0.25% from other races, and 0.35% from two or more races. Hispanic or Latino of any race were 0.94% of the population.

There were 1,982 households, out of which 36.3% had children under the age of 18 living with them, 36.5% were married couples living together, 26.8% had a female householder with no husband present, and 32.6% were non-families. 29.6% of all households were made up of individuals, and 12.1% had someone living alone who was 65 years of age or older. The average household size was 2.53 and the average family size was 3.12.

In the city, the population was spread out, with 29.5% under the age of 18, 10.9% from 18 to 24, 25.5% from 25 to 44, 20.1% from 45 to 64, and 14.0% who were 65 years of age or older. The median age was 33 years. For every 100 females, there were 82.5 males. For every 100 females age 18 and over, there were 73.3 males.

The median income for a household in the city was $22,357, and the median income for a family was $27,754. Males had a median income of $29,602 versus $16,887 for females. The per capita income for the city was $12,946. About 31.1% of families and 32.7% of the population were below the poverty line, including 43.1% of those under age 18 and 17.4% of those age 65 or over.

== Education ==
The city is served by the Wayne County School District. The city's high school level education is provided by Wayne County High School (public) and Wayne Academy (private).

The county is in the zone for Jones College.

== Notable people ==
- Three Major League Baseball players were born in Waynesboro: Claude Passeau (1909), Paul Busby (1918), and Jeff Branson (1967).
- Beauty queen Jalin Wood was born in Waynesboro; she won Miss Mississippi in 2004, then competed in the Miss America and Miss USA pageants.
- Spencer Johnson, football defensive tackle for Minnesota Vikings, Buffalo Bills.
- James Marion West, Sr., noted Texan oilman, cattle rancher, lumberman, and philanthropist, was born in Waynesboro (1871).
- Benito Jones, pro football player for the Detroit Lions.
