= Claudette =

- Gender: female

Other names
- Related names: Claude, Claudetta, Claudia, Claudio

Claudette is a feminine form of the masculine given name Claude. It can also be a surname.

Claudette may refer to:

== People ==
=== First ===
- Claudette Abela Baldacchino (born 1973), Maltese politician
- Claudette Boyer (1938–2013), Canadian politician
- Claudette Bradshaw (1949–2022), Canadian politician
- Claudette Bryanston, English theatre director
- Claudette Cayrol (born 1959), French computer scientist
- Claudette Colbert (1903–1996), American actress
- Claudette Colvin (1939–2026), American civil rights pioneer
- Claudette Godfrey, American director of festival programming
- Claudette Hauiti (born 1961), New Zealand politician
- Claudette Herbster-Josland (born 1946), French fencer
- Claudette Holmes (born 1962), British photographer
- Claudette Johnson (born 1959), British visual artist
- Claudette Joseph, Grenadian politician
- Claudette MacKay-Lassonde (1948–2000), Canadian engineer
- Claudette Maillé (born 1964), Mexican actress
- Claudette Masdammer (1939–2013), Guyanese sprinter
- Claudette Millar (1935–2016), Canadian politician
- Claudette Mink (born 1971), Canadian actress
- Claudette Mukasakindi (born 1982), Rwandan long-distance runner
- Claudette Nevins (1937–2020), American actress
- Claudette Ortiz (born 1981), American singer
- Claudette Pace (born 1968), Maltese politician
- Claudette Peters (born 1979), Antiguan singer
- Claudette Powell (born 1952), Bahamian sprinter
- Claudette Monica Powell (born 1966), American nun and TikToker
- Claudette Rogers Robinson (born 1942), American singer
- Claudette Schreuders (born 1973), South African sculptor and painter
- Claudette Soares (1935–2026), Brazilian singer
- Claudette Sorel (1932–1999), French-American pianist and educator
- Claudette Tardif (born 1947), Canadian politician
- Claudette Wells (born 1954), American actress and voice actress
- Claudette Werleigh (born 1946), Haiti's first female prime minister (1995–1996)
- Claudette White (1971–2021), Quechuan Tribal Indian Court judge
- Claudette Woodard (1945–2010), American politician

=== Middle name ===
- Celine Dion (born 1968), Canadian singer
- Geraldine Darden (born 1936), American mathematician

=== Surname ===
- Forest Claudette, Australian musician
- Irere Claudette, Rwandan technology professional and politician

=== Fictional characters ===
- Claudette Beaulieu, from the American soap opera General Hospital
- Claudette Hubbard, from the British soap opera EastEnders
- Claudette St. Croix, one of the superhero M-Twins
- Claudette Wyms, from the American television series The Shield
- Claudette, from the 1980 film Friday the 13th
- Claudette, from the 2003 film The Room
- Claudette Morel, from Dead by Daylight

Tropical Cyclones

In the Atlantic Ocean:

- Tropical Storm Claudette (1979), traversed the Greater Antilles and made its final landfall near the made landfall near the Texas-Louisiana border.
- Hurricane Claudette (1985), long-lived hurricane that wandered northeastward and grazed the Azores.
- Hurricane Claudette (1991), Category 4 hurricane that remained at sea.
- Tropical Storm Claudette (1997), passed southeast of the Outer Banks and moved out to sea.
- Hurricane Claudette (2003), made landfall near Puerto Morelos, Quintana Roo, then later struck near Port O'Connor, Texas.
- Tropical Storm Claudette (2009), made landfall on Santa Rosa Island, Florida.
- Tropical Storm Claudette (2015), a short-lived tropical storm that formed off the coast of North Carolina and dissipated over the open Atlantic.
- Tropical Storm Claudette (2021), a weak storm that caused heavy rain and tornadoes across the Southeastern United States.

In the south-west Indian Ocean:

- Cyclone Claudette (1979), caused severe damage to Mauritius and Réunion.

== See also ==
- Claudete Alves Pina (born 1971), Brazilian sprinter
