= Claudette (disambiguation) =

Claudette is a feminine name.

Claudette may also refer to:

- "Claudette" (song), a song written by Roy Orbison and released by The Everly Brothers in 1958
- Tropical Storm Claudette, numerous tropical cyclones
