= Tropical Storm Erika (2009) =

Atlantic tropical storm in 2009

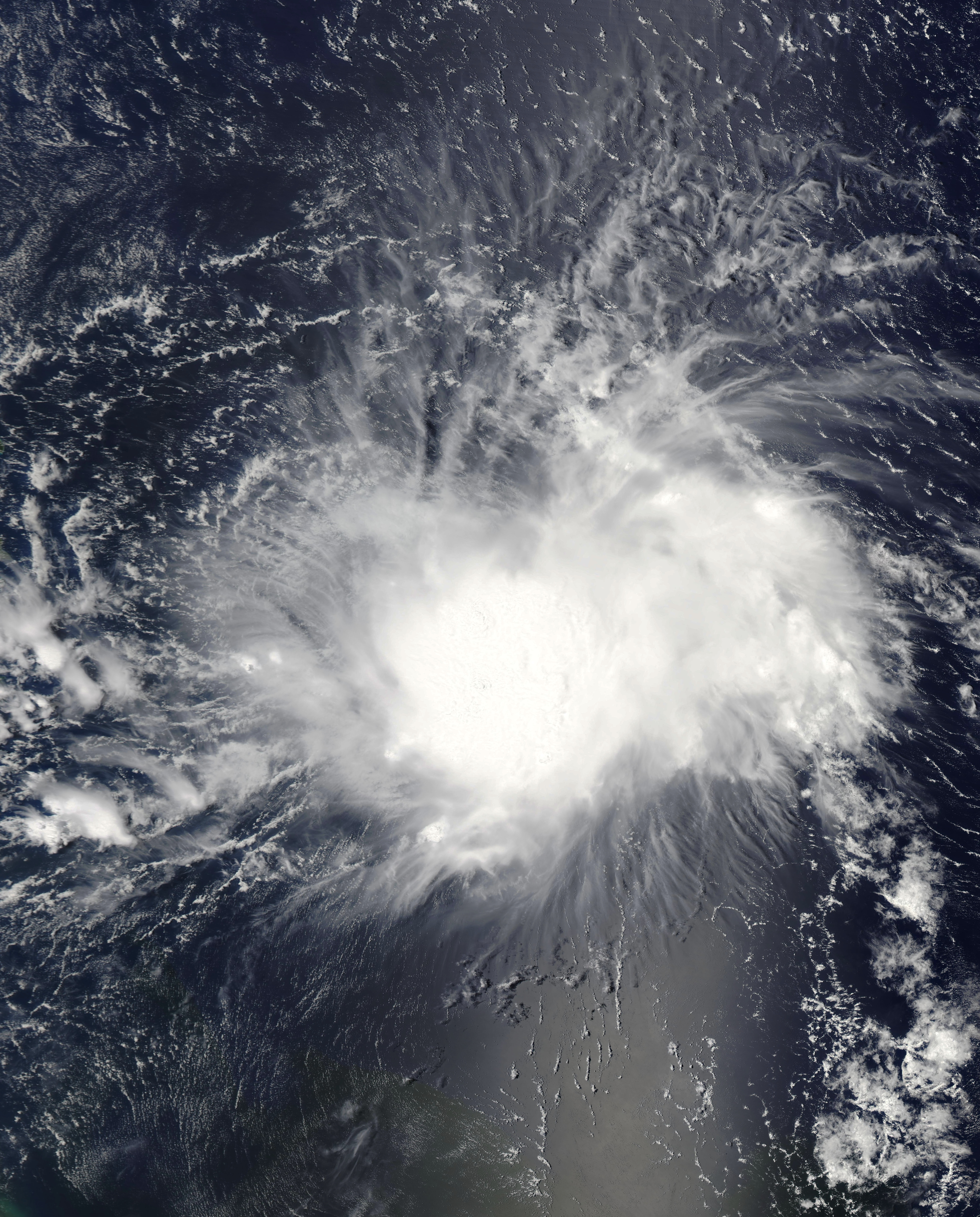
- Tropical Storm Erika east of the Lesser Antilles on September 1

Meteorological history
- Formed: September 1, 2009
- Remnant low: September 3
- Dissipated: September 4, 2009

Tropical storm
- 1-minute sustained (SSHWS/NWS)
- Highest winds: 50 mph (85 km/h)
- Lowest pressure: 1004 mbar (hPa); 29.65 inHg

Overall effects
- Fatalities: None reported
- Damage: $35,000 (2009 USD)
- Areas affected: Lesser Antilles, Puerto Rico and the Dominican Republic
- IBTrACS
- Part of the 2009 Atlantic hurricane season

Tropical Storm Erika was a short-lived tropical cyclone that brought minor impacts to the Lesser Antilles. The fifth named storm of the 2009 Atlantic hurricane season, Erika originated out of a tropical wave on September 1 near the Lesser Antilles. Although it was a disorganized system, it was immediately declared a tropical storm, rather than a tropical depression. Later that day, the system reached its peak intensity with winds of 50 mph (85 km/h) and a barometric pressure of 1004 mbar (hPa; 29.65 inHg). Increased wind shear caused the storm to weaken shortly thereafter, with Erika barely maintaining tropical storm-status by September 2. Later that day, the storm passed over the island of Guadeloupe and entered the Caribbean Sea. On September 3, Erika weakened to a tropical depression as the low pressure center became fully displaced from convective activity. Later that day, the system degenerated into a remnant low before dissipating near Puerto Rico on September 4.

Due to the storm's low intensity, Erika produced little damage in the Lesser Antilles during its passage through the islands. Guadeloupe recorded up to 12.1 in (310 mm) of rain, leading to flooding and some landslides; 12,000 people on the island were left without power. Several other islands recorded moderate rainfall form the system before the tropical storm degenerated into a remnant low. In Puerto Rico, the cyclone's remnants produced heavy rainfall, peaking at 7.58 in (193 mm), that triggered flooding in several regions.

== Meteorological history ==
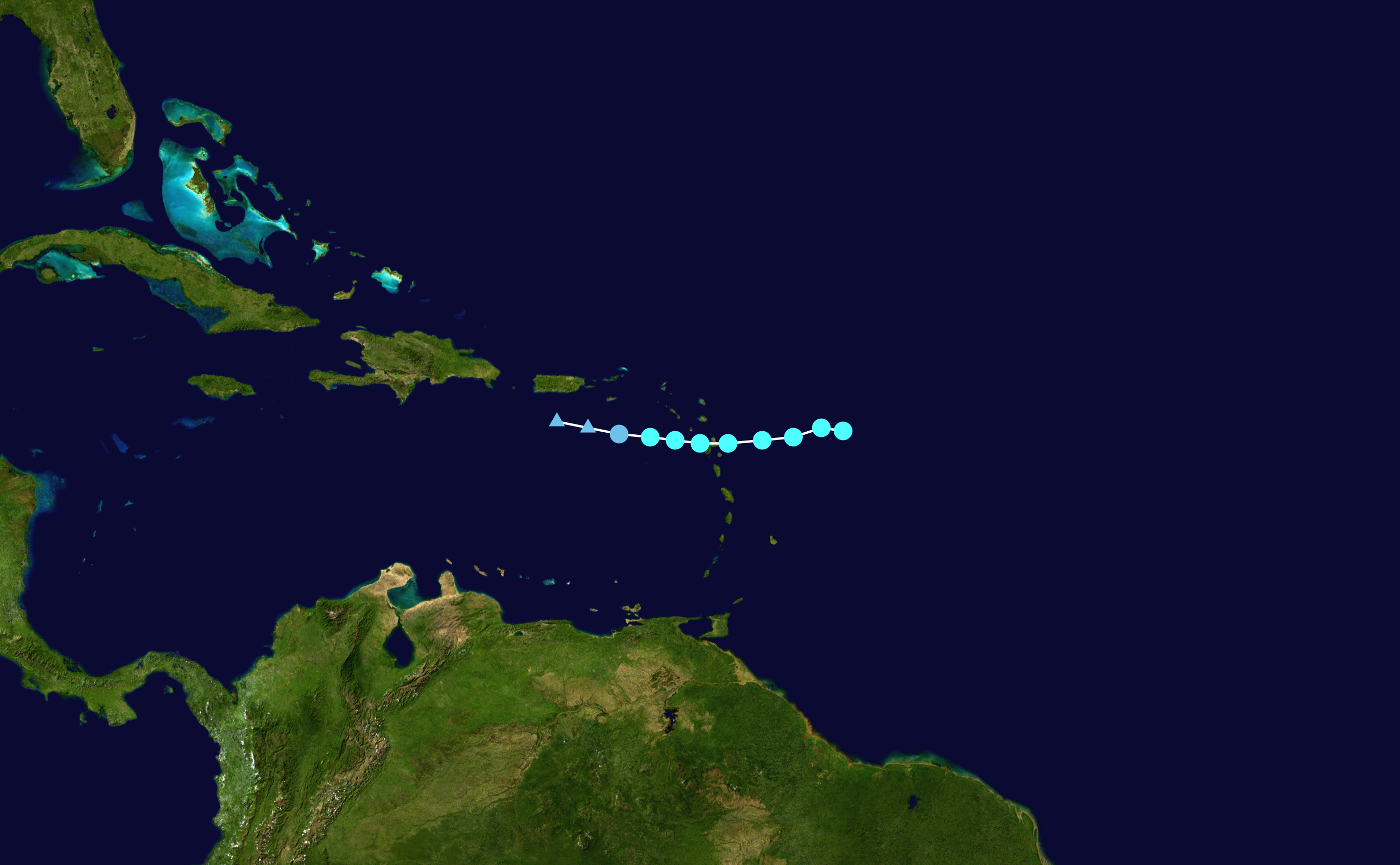
Map plotting the storm's track and intensity, according to the Saffir–Simpson scale Map key Saffir–Simpson scale Tropical depression (≤38 mph, ≤62 km/h) Tropical storm (39–73 mph, 63–118 km/h) Category 1 (74–95 mph, 119–153 km/h) Category 2 (96–110 mph, 154–177 km/h) Category 3 (111–129 mph, 178–208 km/h) Category 4 (130–156 mph, 209–251 km/h) Category 5 (≥157 mph, ≥252 km/h) Unknown Storm type Tropical cyclone Subtropical cyclone Extratropical cyclone, remnant low, tropical disturbance, or monsoon depression

Tropical Storm Erika originated from a tropical wave accompanied by disorganized shower and thunderstorm activity that moved off the west coast of Africa, near the Cape Verde Islands, on August 25. The following day, convection surrounding the wave began to show signs of organization as it tracked westward across the Atlantic. By August 28, an area of low pressure developed from the wave. Environmental conditions ahead of the low were favorable for further development of the system. Despite the favorable conditions, the low became increasingly disorganized on August 29, with little convection remaining around the center of circulation. The next day, the system quickly became organized, with shower and thunderstorms developing around the center and the National Hurricane Center (NHC) noted that the low would likely become a tropical depression within 24 hours. Although convection was well-organized, the system lacked a defined low-level circulation center, leading to the NHC not issuing advisories on the system at that time.

On September 1, a Hurricane Hunter reconnaissance mission into the low found a closed circulation center and tropical storm-force winds. Upon finding the low-level circulation center, the NHC began monitoring the system as Tropical Storm Erika, the fifth named storm of the 2009 season. Erika was slightly disorganized due to moderate wind shear, with the center partially devoid of convection. However, with warm sea surface temperatures, the storm was forecast to intensify to a strong tropical storm within a few days. A mid-level ridge to the north led to Erika maintaining a general westward track for most of its existence. Several hours after being classified, the storm reached its peak intensity with winds of 50 mph (85 km/h) and a barometric pressure of 1004 mbar (hPa; 29.65 inHg). However, the peak intensity was operationally placed at 60 mph (95 km/h) based on readings from reconnaissance missions. In post-storm analysis of these readings, it was determined that the NHC had overestimated the wind speeds in an area of unusually heavy rains. By the morning of September 2, Erika became significantly disorganized, and Hurricane Hunters reported the possibility that multiple circulation centers existed within the broader storm system.

Wind shear began to increase earlier than forecast models anticipated, causing the storm to weaken into a minimal tropical storm later that morning. Around 1830 UTC, the center of Erika passed over the island of Guadeloupe with winds of 40 mph (65 km/h) as the storm entered the eastern Caribbean Sea. The circulation later became elongated and began to degenerate into a trough of low pressure. The NHC noted that due to the large size of the overall system, the center of Erika could reform elsewhere and restrengthen. Following a brief increase in convective activity, the storm slightly intensified before succumbing to wind shear once more. By the afternoon of September 3, the center of Erika was fully devoid of convection and the NHC downgraded it to a tropical depression. Shortly after, the system degenerated into a remnant low, coinciding with the issuance of the final advisory from the NHC. The following day, the remnants approached the southern coast of Puerto Rico, producing heavy rainfall across the island. The system was last noted later on September 4 as it dissipated roughly 80 mi (140 km) south of Puerto Rico.

== Preparations ==
Tropical Storm Erika in the eastern Caribbean Sea on September 3

Upon the declaration of Tropical Storm Erika on September 1, tropical storm watches were issued for St. Maarten, Antigua, Barbuda, St. Kitts, Nevis, Anguilla, St. Martin and Saint Barthélemy. The following day, all of the watches were upgraded to tropical storm warnings as Erika neared the Lesser Antilles. When the storm entered the Caribbean Sea, a tropical storm warning was issued for Dominica and tropical storm watches were for Puerto Rico, the U.S. Virgin Islands and the British Virgin Islands. Early on September 3, the tropical storm watches were upgraded to warnings as Erika drifted through the eastern Caribbean. Later that day, the warnings for Dominica and Guadeloupe were discontinued. Shortly thereafter, all remaining warnings were canceled.

Exports from the Hovensa oil refinery in St. Croix, with a daily production of roughly 500,000 barrels (79,000 m^{3}), were canceled as ports across the island were closed. All businesses were shut down in Dominica on September 3 due to the storm. In Antigua and Barbuda, all schools and the local airport were closed as a precautionary measure. Two cruise ships, the Carnival Glory and a Royal Caribbean ship postponed their docking dates and stayed at sea for a few additional days. The islands of Saint Martin and Saint Barthélemy were placed under an orange alert, the second-lowest alert level, and Guadeloupe was placed under a yellow alert, the lowest alert level. In Puerto Rico, officials closed schools and government offices on September 4 and opened 433 shelters across the island. Officials in the Dominican Republic placed nine provinces under warnings as a precautionary measure. Nearby Haiti was also alerted of the possibility of heavy rains.

== Impact ==
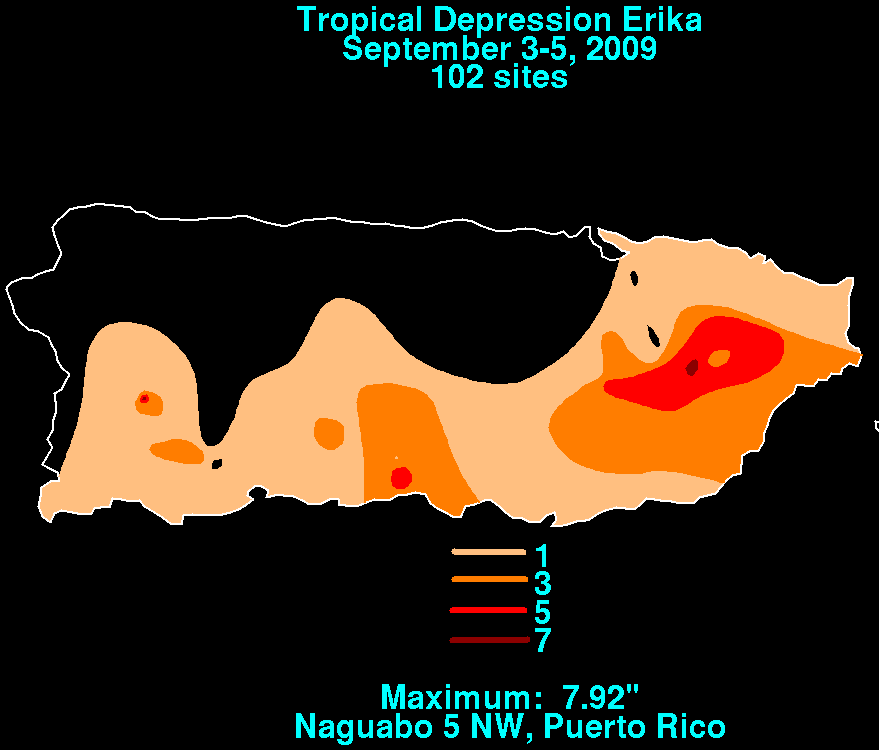
Rain amounts in Puerto Rico

On September 3, all governmental buildings in Dominica were closed due to flooding triggered by heavy rain from Erika. Landslides were reported in Petite Savanne resulting in road closures. In Guadeloupe, heavy rainfall from Erika, exceeding 7.9 in (200 mm) in several areas, produced flooding in Côte-sous-le-Vent. The most significant rain was recorded on La Désirade at 12.1 in (310 mm), of which a record 9.4 in (240 mm) fell in 24 hours. Sustained winds reached 56 mph (90 km/h) on the island of Marie Galante. One rock slide occurred near Losteau, in Bouillante. Several roads became impassable due to flood waters. At the height of the storm, an estimated 12,000 people were without power across the island. Up to 5.5 in (140 mm) of rain fell along the foothills in Trinidad. In St. Martin, a peak of 3.7 in (94 mm) of rain fell. In the United States Virgin Islands, up to 1.61 in (41 mm) of rain fell in a 24‑hour span, resulting in minor flooding.

In Puerto Rico, the remnants of Erika produced significant amounts of rainfall, causing the rivers of La Plata, Loíza and Caguitas to overflow their banks and trigger widespread flooding. A weather station in Naguabo recorded 7.92 in (201 mm) of precipitation. Several other areas recorded upwards of 4 in (100 mm). In the municipality of Guanica, several homes were flooded, leaving $5,000 in damage. The most severe damage took place in the municipality of Las Piedras where $15,000 was reported in flood losses. One river rose to a level of 29.27 ft (8.92 m), 7.27 ft (2.22 m) above flood stage. Damage in Fajardo was estimated at $10,000 after homes were inundated by flood waters. Additionally, flooding in Caguas resulted in $5,000 in damage. In the Dominican Republic flood warnings were issued for the provinces of La Altagracia, El Seibo, Hato Mayor, Monte Plata, Samana, Duarte and Maria Trinidad Sanchez due to the threat of continued rainfall and flooding.

== See also ==
- 2009 Atlantic hurricane season
- Timeline of the 2009 Atlantic hurricane season
- List of storms in the 2009 Atlantic hurricane season
- Tropical Storm Erika (2015) - deadly storm with the same name that affected similar areas
