= List of storms named Claudette =

The name Claudette has been used for eight tropical cyclones in the Atlantic Ocean and for one in the South-West Indian Ocean.

In the Atlantic Ocean:

- Tropical Storm Claudette (1979), traversed the Greater Antilles and made its final landfall near the made landfall near the Texas-Louisiana border.
- Hurricane Claudette (1985), long-lived hurricane that wandered northeastward and grazed the Azores.
- Hurricane Claudette (1991), Category 4 hurricane that remained at sea.
- Tropical Storm Claudette (1997), passed southeast of the Outer Banks and moved out to sea.
- Hurricane Claudette (2003), made landfall near Puerto Morelos, Quintana Roo, then later struck near Port O'Connor, Texas.
- Tropical Storm Claudette (2009), made landfall on Santa Rosa Island, Florida.
- Tropical Storm Claudette (2015), a short-lived tropical storm that formed off the coast of North Carolina and dissipated over the open Atlantic.
- Tropical Storm Claudette (2021), a weak storm that caused heavy rain and tornadoes across the Southeastern United States.

In the south-west Indian Ocean:

- Cyclone Claudette (1979), caused severe damage to Mauritius and Réunion.
