= Tropical Storm Claudette (2009) =

Atlantic tropical storm in 2009

- Tropical Storm Claudette intensifying off the Florida coast on August 16

Meteorological history
- Formed: August 16, 2009
- Dissipated: August 18, 2009

Tropical storm
- 1-minute sustained (SSHWS/NWS)
- Highest winds: 60 mph (95 km/h)
- Lowest pressure: 1005 mbar (hPa); 29.68 inHg

Overall effects
- Fatalities: 2 direct
- Damage: $350,000 (2009 USD)
- Areas affected: Southeastern United States
- IBTrACS
- Part of the 2009 Atlantic hurricane season

Tropical Storm Claudette was the third named storm of the 2009 Atlantic hurricane season and the first tropical cyclone of 2009 to affect the United States. Forming out of a tropical wave and an upper-level low pressure system on August 16, Claudette quickly intensified into a tropical storm offshore south of Tallahassee, Florida. By the afternoon, the storm had attained winds of 60 mph (97 km/h) and steadily tracked towards the Florida Panhandle. Early on August 17, the center of Claudette made landfall on Santa Rosa Island. Several hours after landfall, the storm weakened to a tropical depression and the Hydrometeorological Prediction Center took over primary responsibility of the storm. Later on August 17, the final public advisory was issued on the system as it dissipated over Alabama.

The National Hurricane Center issued tropical storm warnings for the coastline and residents in some counties were advised to evacuate storm-surge-prone areas. One fatality resulted from rough seas off the coast of Panama City, Florida. Later that day, another man drowned after falling off his ship near Bay County. An EF0 tornado spawned by the storm in Cape Coral, Florida damaged 11 homes, leaving $103,000 (2009 USD) in damages. Additional damages to coastal property and beaches amounted to $125,000 (2009 USD) as a result of Claudette.

== Meteorological history ==
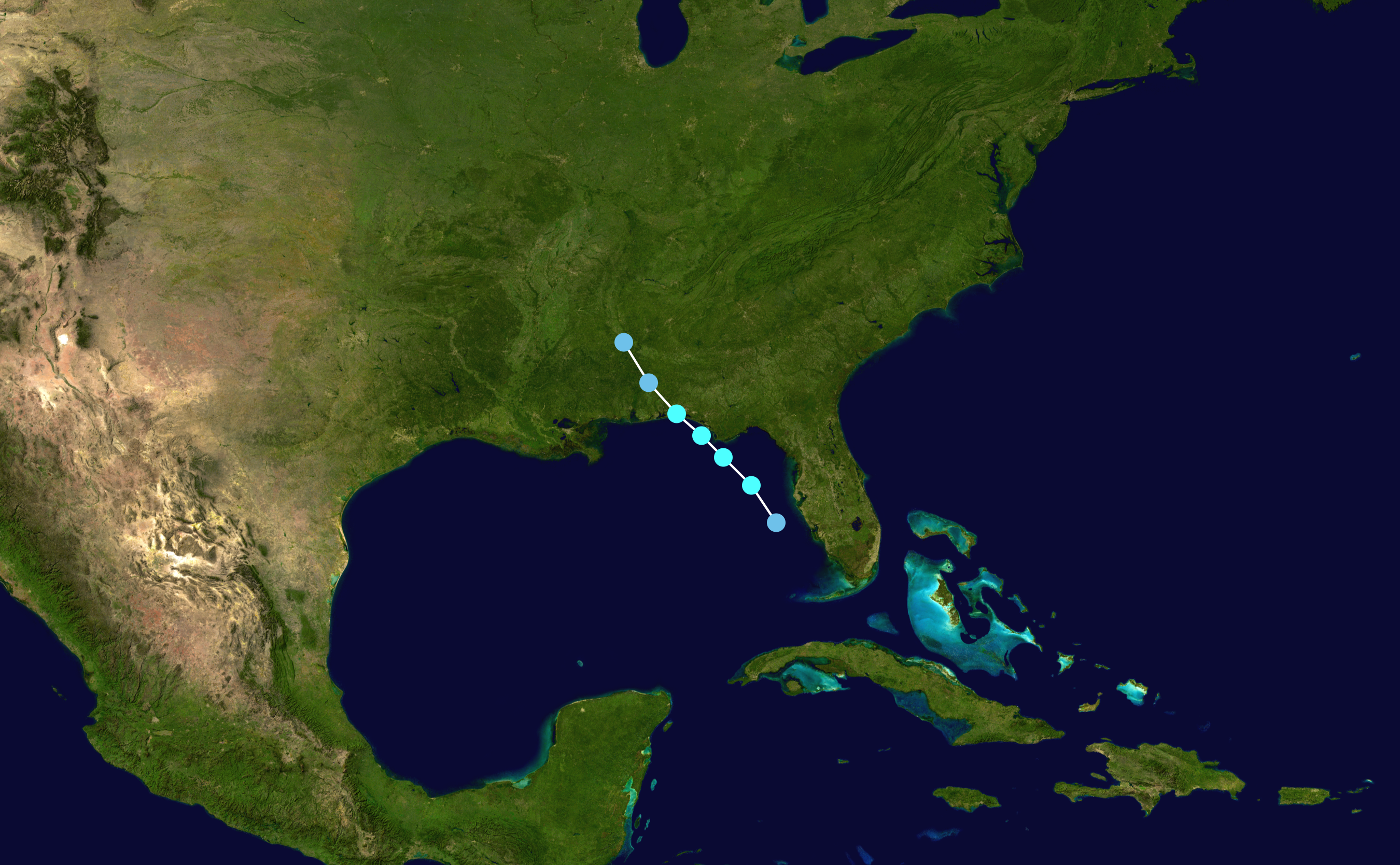
Map plotting the storm's track and intensity, according to the Saffir–Simpson scale Map key Saffir–Simpson scale Tropical depression (≤38 mph, ≤62 km/h) Tropical storm (39–73 mph, 63–118 km/h) Category 1 (74–95 mph, 119–153 km/h) Category 2 (96–110 mph, 154–177 km/h) Category 3 (111–129 mph, 178–208 km/h) Category 4 (130–156 mph, 209–251 km/h) Category 5 (≥157 mph, ≥252 km/h) Unknown Storm type Tropical cyclone Subtropical cyclone Extratropical cyclone, remnant low, tropical disturbance, or monsoon depression

Tropical Storm Claudette originated from a tropical wave that moved off the west coast of Africa on August 7. On August 11, the National Hurricane Center (NHC) began monitoring the wave when it was located roughly 600 mi (970 km) east of the Lesser Antilles. Disorganized shower and thunderstorm activity was associated with the westward moving wave; however, the NHC did not anticipate further development of the system. By the afternoon of August 12, little convective activity remained with the wave. Strong upper-level wind shear created an unfavorable environment for the system to re-organize as it tracked through the eastern Caribbean Sea.

By August 15, convection began to consolidate around the center of the system as it passed over the Florida Keys. Early on August 16, the system rapidly organized, with a low-level circulation developing roughly 80 mi (130 km) southwest of Tampa, Florida. Favorable environmental conditions led to the NHC anticipating the system to develop into a tropical depression later that day. Several hours later, the first advisory was issued on Tropical Depression Four. Low wind shear provided an environment that promoted quick development of the cyclone and the storm was forecast to attain tropical storm status within 12 hours. The depression tracked northwest around the periphery of a subtropical ridge to the east. Around 11:00 am EDT, the NHC upgraded the depression to a tropical storm and gave it the name Claudette in light of information from the NEXRAD Doppler weather radar in Tallahassee, Florida that found winds of 40 mph (64 km/h) around the center of circulation.

During the afternoon of August 16, a brief increase in wind shear due to a trough over the southeastern United States, caused the center to become exposed. Despite this, Claudette attained its peak winds of 60 mph (97 km/h) around this time. Around 1:10 am EDT (0510 UTC) on August 17, the storm made landfall near the eastern end of Santa Rosa Island with winds of 45 mph (72 km/h) and a barometric pressure of 1005 mbar (hPa; 29.68 inHg), the lowest pressure recorded in association with the storm. Several hours after landfall, convection associated with the storm quickly decreased and by 8:00 am EDT, the NHC issued their final advisory on Claudette as it weakened to a tropical depression. At this time, the Hydrometeorological Prediction Center (HPC) began issuing advisories on the system. The HPC issued their final advisory late on August 17 as the remnants of Claudette began to dissipate over Alabama. The remnants persisted for several more hours before becoming indistinguishable over Mississippi, on August 18.

== Preparations ==
Upon being classified a tropical depression, the National Hurricane Center issued a tropical storm warning for areas between the Alabama-Florida border and the mouth of the Suwannee River. Residents in these areas were urged to quickly prepare for the storm by ensuring their hurricane kit was fully stocked and ready. East of the center of Claudette, along western Florida, residents were warned about possible heavy rainfall that could cause flooding. Storm surge near where the storm was forecast to make landfall was expected to reach 3 to 5 ft (0.91 to 1.52 m). Residents in areas of Wakulla County prone to storm surge were urged to evacuate before the arrival of the storm by the Wakulla County Emergency Management Office. Shortly after 3:00 pm EDT, the National Weather Service in Mobile, Alabama issued a tropical storm wind warning for areas between Destin, Florida and Pascagoula, Mississippi. A flood watch was also issued for most of the Florida Panhandle, as rainfall from Claudette was anticipated to exceed 7 in (180 mm). An inland tropical storm warning was also issued for most of southeastern Alabama.

During the afternoon of August 16, officials issued a mandatory evacuation order for residents in St. Joseph Peninsula State Park and Stone State Park on Cape San Blas in Gulf County, Florida. Two shelters were opened in Bay County, one at the Dean Bozeman High School and the other at Bozeman Learning Center. Voluntary evacuation orders were also given to residents living in low-lying areas along the coastline. Although no plans were put in place to open shelters, the Emergency Operations Center in Washington County raised their activation level to stage two. In Franklin County, the Emergency Operations Center was placed at stage three and voluntary evacuation orders were issued for Alligator Point. After an afternoon briefing, officials in Walton County declared a State of Emergency based on available information on the storm. In Wakulla County, the American Red Cross opened a shelter in Crawfordville at a local church.

== Impact ==
=== Florida ===
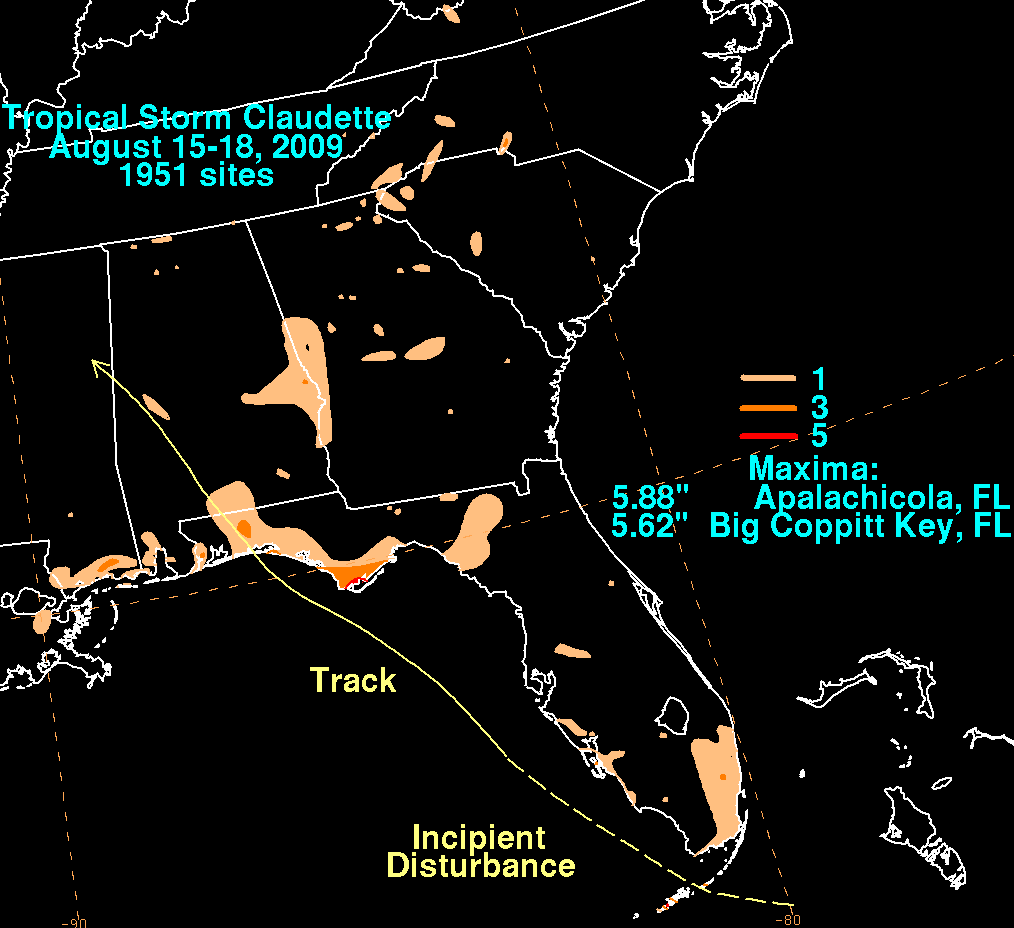
Storm total rainfall for Claudette

By the evening of August 16, upwards of 1.71 in (43 mm) of rain had fallen in parts of Franklin County. In Apalachicola, a daily record of 3.57 in (91 mm) of rain fell on August 16, surpassing the previous record set in 1931. However, with an exception of a tree falling across U.S. Route 98, no damage was caused to Apalachicola. By the dissipation of the storm, a maximum of 5.62 in (143 mm) of rain fell in Big Coppitt Key.

A tornado was reported near Cape Coral and multiple tornado warnings were issued for Florida in association with rain bands from the storm. Twenty-three homes were damaged by the tornado in Cape Coral. Damages to 11 out of 23 of the homes from the tornado amounted to roughly $103,000. Florida Governor Charlie Crist briefly toured the damage from the tornado. The tornado was later rated EF0 with winds between 70 and 80 mph (110 and 130 km/h). The National Weather Service also stated that the tornado was on the ground for 0.35 mi (0.56 km) between 4:42 pm and 4:45 pm EDT.

Tropical Depression Claudette weakening over Alabama on August 17

One drowning was reported off Panama City, Florida. By the early evening, officials closed down a 1 mi (1.6 km) segment of Highway 20 due to a fallen tree and power line. In Leon County, a total of 440 residences lost power. By 9:40 pm EDT, the highway was reopened and power to all 440 homes was restored. Other power outages were reported near Parker and in downtown Panama City. Roughly 500 residences were left without power in Walton County.

In Okaloosa County, up to 1,267 residents lost power during the storm. Most of the residents had their power restored within a few hours; however, due to continuing wind damage, scattered power outages, affecting up to 500 homes at a time, occurred throughout the county. Throughout the county, roughly $25,000 was sustained in flood losses. A second fatality occurred after a man was knocked off his ship near the coast of Bay County. Rescuers managed to reach him but during the rescue, he fell off the life raft and was lost. The search was later called off as he was presumed dead.

Along the coastline, waves produced by Claudette resulted in the loss of 30 to 40 ft (9.1 to 12.2 m) of sand in coastal areas of Bay, Walton, Franklin and Gulf counties. An estimated $100,000 worth of sand was lost in all four counties. A maximum storm surge of 2.3 ft (0.70 m) was recorded in Destin as the storm made landfall. In all, two people were killed throughout the state and damages amounted to $350,000.

=== Elsewhere ===
Upon making landfall, flash flood watches were issued for parts of southern Alabama due to the threat of heavy rainfall. In the state, Claudette produced widespread moderate rainfall, peaking at 2.11 in (54 mm) in Bradley. Some areas received up to 2 in (51 mm) in a two-hour span, prompting the National Weather Service to issue flash flood warnings. Flash flood watches were also issued for Hale, Sumter and Perry counties. The remnants of Claudette created a very moist atmosphere in parts of Alabama, resulting in several days of afternoon thunderstorms. Some of these thunderstorms produced gusty winds, recorded up to 45 mph (72 km/h) in Jefferson County. In Rainbow City, lightning struck an apartment building, sparking a fire and leading to the evacuation of two units of the building. Damage from the fire was estimated at $20,000. In Georgia, outer bands of the storm also a maximum of 2.37 in (60 mm) at Fort Benning.

== See also ==
- Other storms of the same name
- List of Florida hurricanes (2000-present)
