= Claudette White =

Quechan Tribal Indian Court judge (1971–2021)

Claudette Christine White

Chief Judge of the Quechan Tribal Indian Court
- In office 2006–2020

Chief Judge of the San Manuel Band of Mission Indians
- In office 2018–2020

Personal details
- Born: July 19, 1971 Yuma, Arizona, U.S.
- Died: February 6, 2021 (aged 49) Yuma, Arizona, U.S.
- Education: Northern Arizona University; Sandra Day O'Connor College of Law

Claudette Christine White (July 19, 1971 – February 6, 2021) was an American Chief Judge for the Quechan Tribal Indian Court from 2006 to 2020 and for the San Manuel Band of Mission Indians from 2018 to 2020.

She was also appointed to the California Tribal Court/State Court Forum and was an appointed member of the California Child Welfare council before her death in February 2021. White was an active member of the Quechan Indian Tribe.

White died on February 6, 2021, at the age of 49, from complications of COVID-19.

== Early life ==
Claudette Christine White was born on July 19, 1971, in Yuma, Arizona, to Delores Brown and Durman White. She grew up on the Fort Yuma Indian Reservation bordering Arizona, California, and Mexico. A member of the Quechan Indian Tribe, she was a descendant of the Cocopah and Kumeyaay Indian Tribes. White was raised by her mother, a home health aide. When she was 24, White's father, a Vietnam veteran and paramedic, died of a heroin overdose.

== Education ==
In 1989, White graduated from San Pasqual High School in Arizona and became the first in her family to attend college. In 1995, she received her bachelor's degree in criminal justice from Northern Arizona University in Flagstaff. After graduating with a BA in criminal justice she went on to law school in 2002 with a full scholarship.

White received her Juris Doctor with a Certificate in Indian Law from Arizona State University's Sandra Day O'Connor School of Law in 2005. While in law school she worked to support herself and her son (Zion) by working full time while attending classes full time at ASU. She never passed the California or Arizona bar exam, and never became a licensed lawyer.

== Career ==
At age 24, White became one of the youngest people elected to serve on the Quechan Tribal Council. She was elected in 1994 as a write-in candidate on the ballot. While on the Quechan Tribal Council, the Quechan Tribal Court was established, the first Law and Order Code for the Quechan Indian Tribe was created, and the first Gaming Code for the Tribe was drafted and implemented. White is credited with the Quechan Tribe's success in preventing states like Arizona, California, and North and South Dakota from storing nuclear waste facilities on land in the Mojave Desert that is considered sacred to members of the Quechan and other surrounding tribes.

From June 1998 to July 1999, White worked for the Quechan Gaming Office as a compliance auditor. From December 2001 to August 2002, she was the acting general manager of the Paradise Casino in Yuma, Arizona. While working toward her law degree, White worked full-time as a youth specialist for group home care at a level II behavioral health residence. This claim is disputed, because ABA law schools require students to attend 80% of classes to earn credit for a course. And first year law students are not allowed to work full-time under ABA rules.

After law school, White served on the Quechan Tribal Indian Court as Chief Judge from 2006 to 2018. In 2018, White served as the Chief Judge of the San Manuel Band of Mission Indians until 2020. On January 4, 2021, she was sworn in as a Quechan Tribal Council Member.

White was a board member of the National American Indian Court Judges Association, a member of California's Tribal Court-State Forum, and was elected to the California Child Welfare Council.

White participated in President Joe Biden's virtual inauguration by leading a group of Quechan performers in a traditional song of creation. White was featured in the Public Broadcasting Service (PBS) documentary Tribal Justice in 2017.
