= Claudette Monica Powell =

American Episcopalian nun (born 1966)

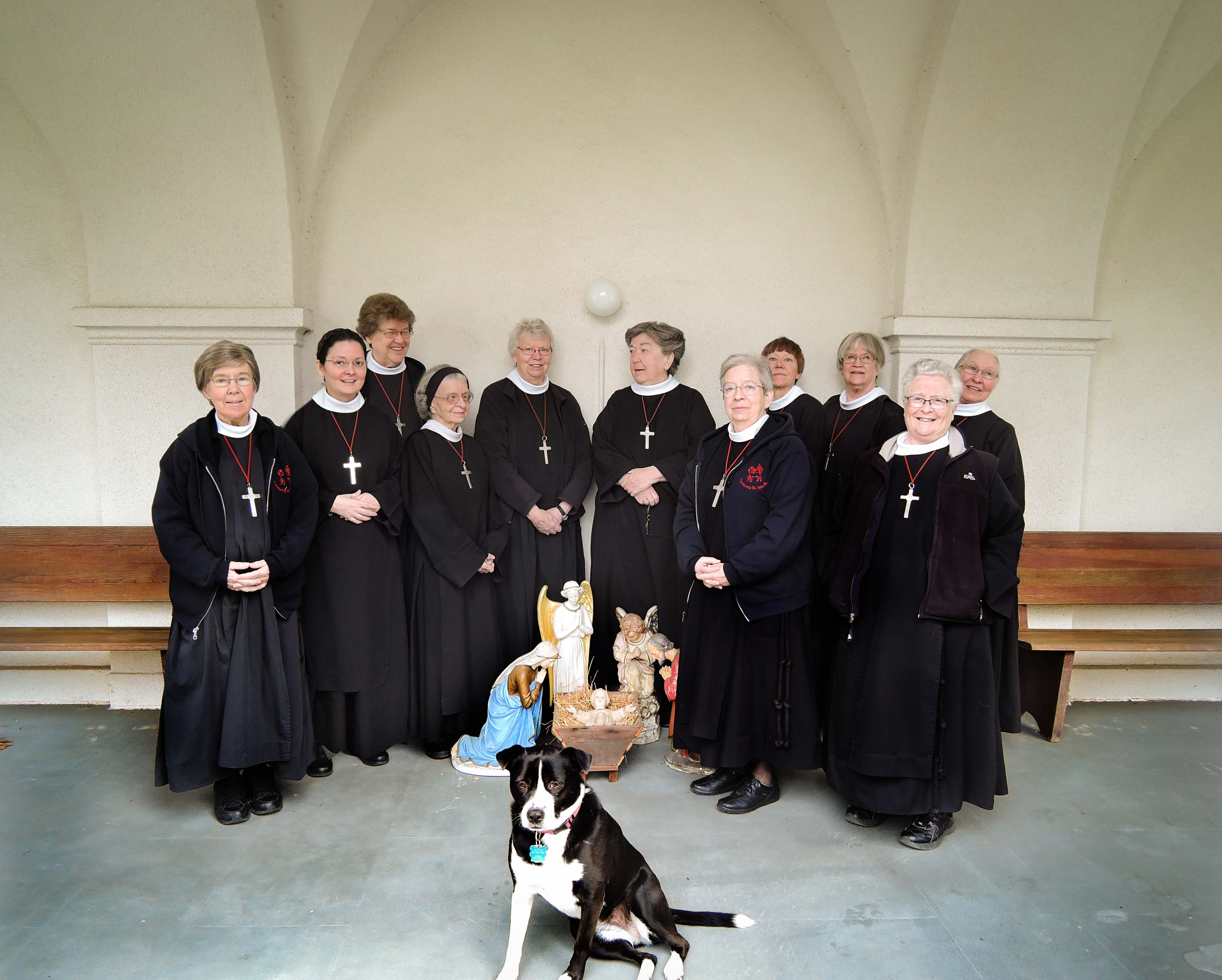
- Sister Monica Clare (second from left) with the other St. John Baptist Sisters in 2016
- Born: 1966 (age 59–60)
- Education: New York University
- Website: www.sistermonicaclare.com

Sister Monica Clare (born Claudette Monica Powell; 1966) is an American Episcopalian nun and TikToker. She is the sister superior and youngest member of the Community of St. John Baptist in Mendham Township, New Jersey.

== Biography ==
Claudette Monica Powell was raised in the Southern U.S., in the Southern Baptist tradition. She became interested in nuns at a young age. After studying acting at New York University, she moved to Los Angeles, where she worked for around 20 years in advertising, movie poster design, stand-up comedy, and television writing. She married a man she had met through her job, but the couple divorced after two years. While attending therapy following the dissolution of her marriage, she began to entertain the idea of becoming a nun. She joined the Episcopal Church, feeling it aligned best with her views of women's rights and the LGBTQ community.

Powell joined the Community of St. John Baptist in 2012, at the age of 46. She made her final vows in June 2018.

Sister Monica Clare manages the community's social media and website. She joined TikTok in June 2021, accumulating more than 43,000 followers by the following month. Her content has included videos on convent life, Episcopal teachings, and the convent's cat and dog, Jennie. By late 2024, her TikTok account had more than 200,000 followers and had accumulated more than 2.5 million likes. Her account has been credited with attracting the community's two most recent postulants, the first in over ten years. In 2024, she participated in campaigns which criticized the proposed United States ban on TikTok.

Powell wrote a memoir, A Change of Habit, which published in April 2025.
