= Claudette Godfrey =

Director and vice president at SXSW

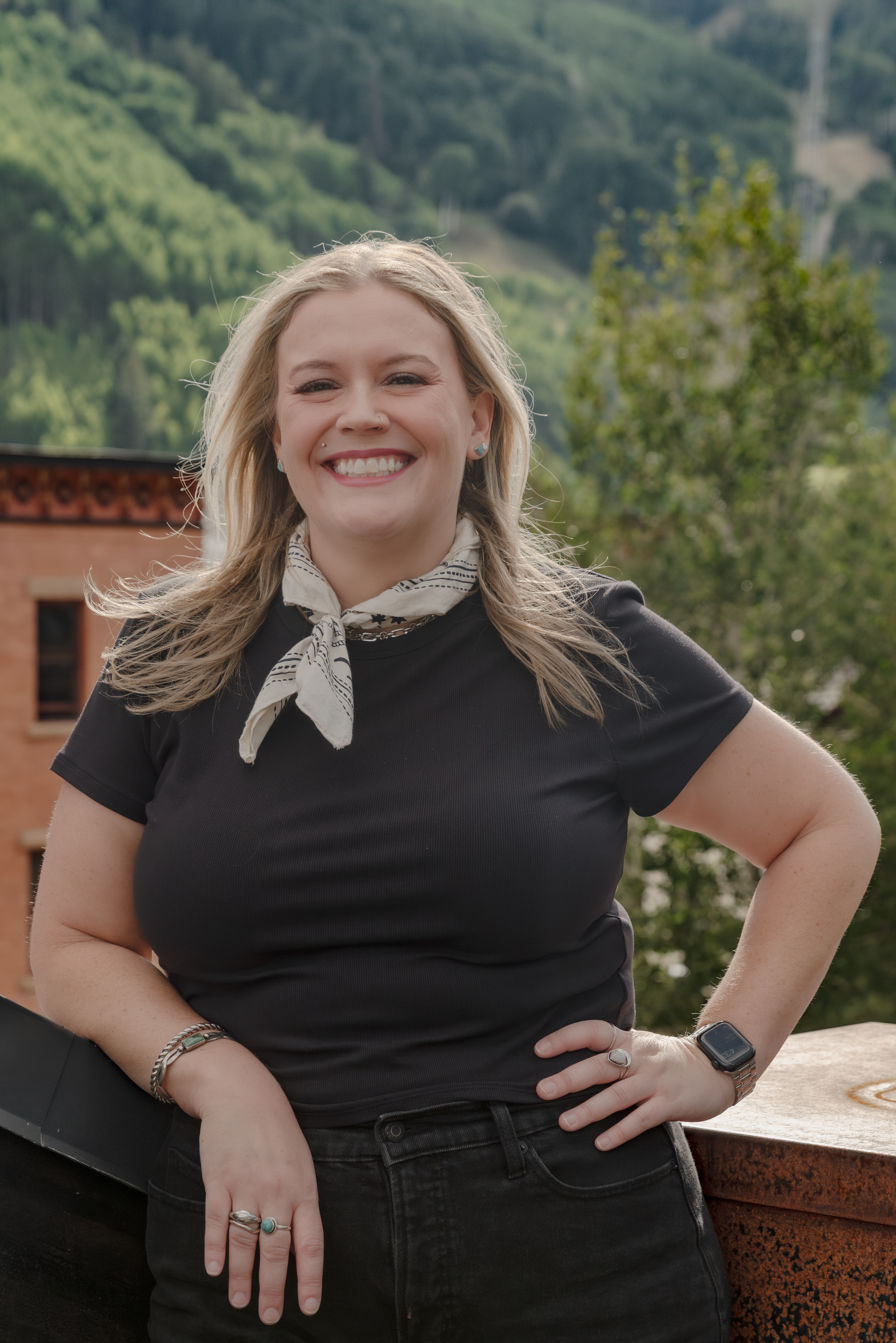
- Born: Austin, Texas
- Education: University of Texas at Austin (BA)
- Employer: South by Southwest

Claudette Godfrey is a film festival programmer. She was the director of festival programming and vice president of film and television at South by Southwest. Having worked at the festival in numerous capacities since 2006, she was promoted to the two roles in 2022.

== Early life ==
Godfrey was born and raised in Austin, Texas. She attended the University of Texas at Austin where she led a "film-focused organization."

== Career ==
Godfrey has worked at South by Southwest since 2006. She first began working for the festival at the age of 19 as a "volunteer traffic manager" after a festival staffer came to her campus club in search of an intern. The following year, she became an official intern. The year after, in 2008, during her last year at the University of Texas, she became the film traffic coordinator.

In the summer after she graduated, Godfrey then worked at CineVegas. Shortly after, she was offered a job as the festival coordinator, which she accepted; in that role, she additionally worked on film programming. In the years following, she was promoted to other roles such as operations manager and shorts programmer in 2010 and, by 2017, a senior film programmer. In 2022, she became the director of festival programming and the vice president of film and television, taking over the latter role from Janet Pierson.
