= List of European tropical cyclones =

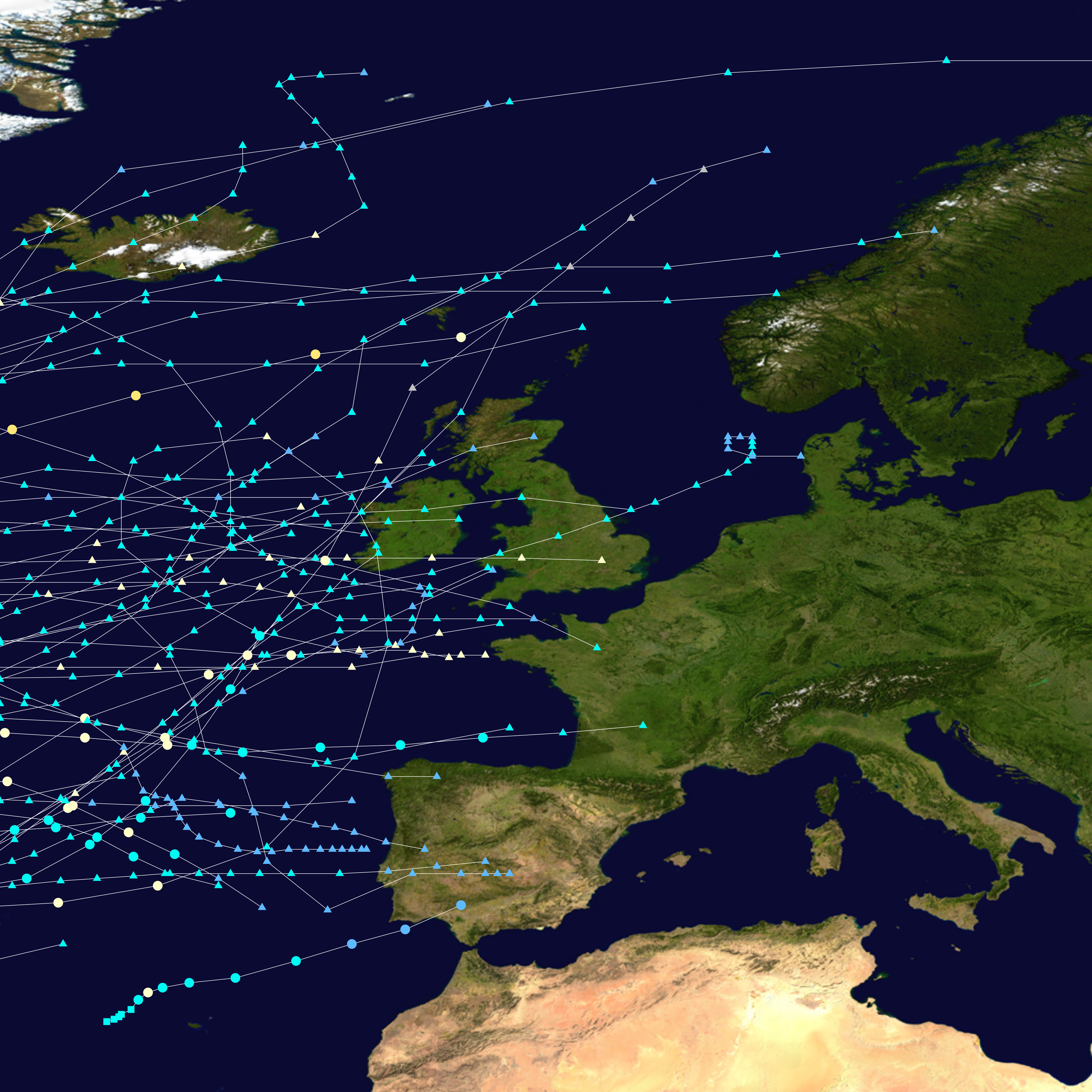
Tracks of all cyclones from the North Atlantic affecting Europe between 1851 and 2014

The effects of tropical cyclones in Europe (Note: For the purposes of the article, mainland Europe is defined as the continent of Europe, including the British Isles and Iceland, but excluding the outermost regions of the European Union, such as the offshore archipelagos of the Azores and the Canary Islands.) and their extratropical remnants include strong winds, heavy rainfall, and in rare instances, tornadoes or snowfall. Only three modern cyclones are officially regarded as directly impacting mainland Europe while still fully tropical or subtropical: Hurricane Vince in 2005, which struck southwestern Spain as a tropical depression; Tropical Storm Rolf in 2011, which formed in the western Mediterranean Sea and affected southern France as a weakening tropical storm; and Subtropical Storm Alpha in 2020, which made landfall in northern Portugal at peak intensity. It is believed that a hurricane struck Europe in 1842. Europe is also affected by Mediterranean tropical-like cyclones. These systems host tropical characteristics, but are not monitored by an official warning center.

Atlantic hurricanes in the subtropical latitudes (i.e., north of the Cape Verde region) generally do not form east of the 30th meridian west, and those that do typically continue to the west. Storms can move around the Bermuda high and turn to the northeast and affect Europe. Several extratropical cyclones have struck Europe, and they were called colloquially "hurricanes". Some of these European windstorms had hurricane-force winds of greater than 119 km/h (74 mph). Those storms are not included in this list.

== Climatology and predictions ==
Advanced meteorological observation stations and ship reports allowed Atlantic hurricanes to be tracked for extended durations, including to the European mainland in some cases, beginning in the 1860s. Most storms that affected Europe have done so from August to October, which is the climatological peak of the Atlantic hurricane season. In a survey of such European tropical cyclones from 1961 to 2010, Dr. Kieran Hickey observed that the storms generally formed west of Africa and recurved to the northeast, or formed off the east coast of the United States and proceeded eastward. Ireland and the United Kingdom experience the most effects, due to their positions far to the west of the rest of Europe. Countries that are as far to the east as Estonia and Russia have experienced tropical cyclone impacts.

Tropical-like systems, referred to as "medicanes," are occasionally observed over the Mediterranean and sometimes make landfall in Europe. Several of these storms have developed eye-like features and hurricane-force winds; however, they are often hybrid systems rather than being purely tropical. Many of these storms originate from deep, cold-core lows which they do not fully disassociate from. Additionally, unlike typical tropical cyclones, sea surface temperatures above 26 °C (79 °F) are not required for their development.

The Royal Netherlands Meteorological Institute predicted that by the year 2100, global warming would increase greatly the threat of hurricane-force winds to western Europe from former tropical cyclones and hybrid storms, the latter similar to Hurricane Sandy in 2012, in a paper published in April 2013. One model predicted an increase from 2 to 13 in the number of cyclones with hurricane-force winds in the waters offshore western Europe. The study suggested that conditions favorable for tropical cyclones would expand 1,100 km (680 mi) to the east. A separate study based out of University of Castilla–La Mancha predicted that hurricanes would develop in the Mediterranean Sea in Septembers by the year 2100, which would threaten countries in southern Europe.

== Storms ==
=== Pre-1900 ===
- August 1680 – A reconstructed path of a hurricane proposed by researchers from contemporary records, which is thought to have undergone extratropical transition over the North Atlantic before affecting Wales and southern England.

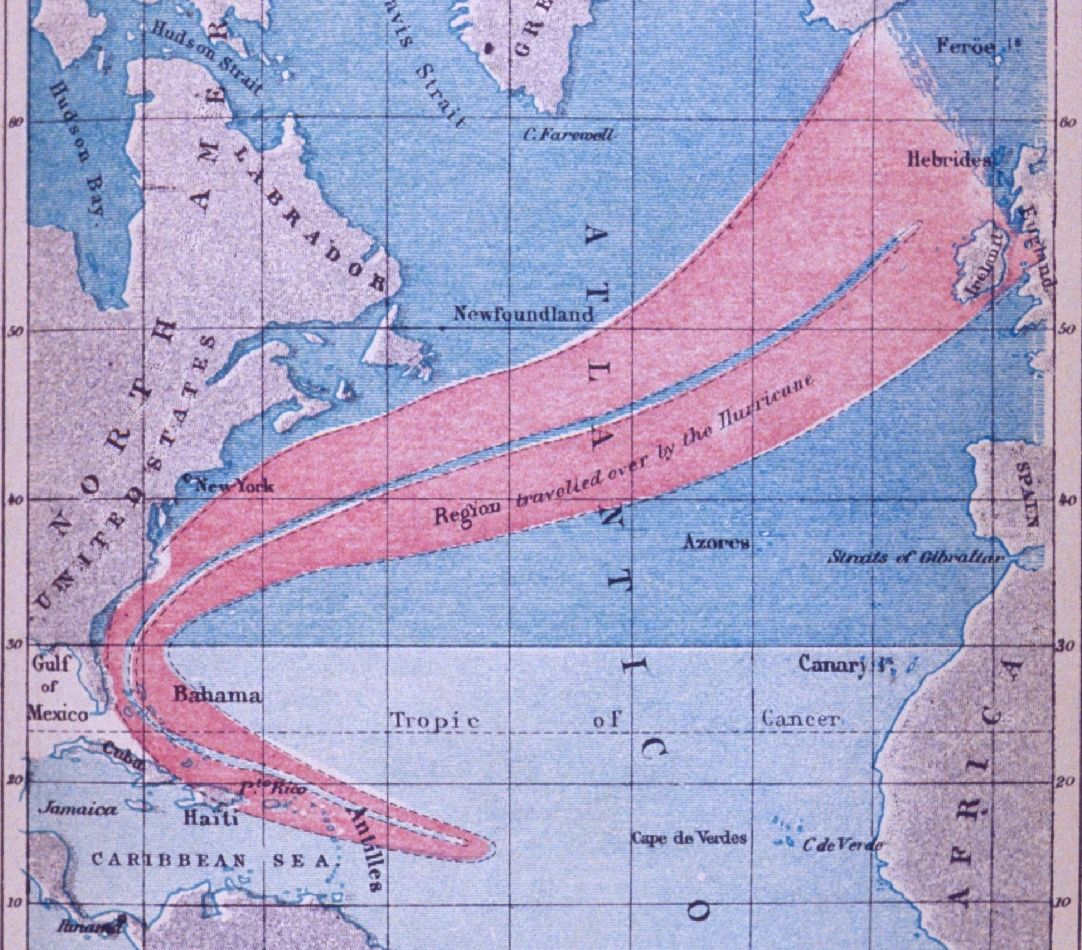
Track of a hurricane in 1848 that extended from the United States to Europe

- November 18–19, 1724 – One of the most destructive storms ever experienced in Portugal since the early 17th century, caused damage to the east coast of Madeira and central and northern Portugal. (There is some conjecture whether this storm was a tropical system such as Hurricane Vince in 2005 which impacted Europe).
- October 29, 1842 – Research presented to the American Meteorological Society suggested that the equivalent of a Category 2 hurricane on the Saffir–Simpson scale (SSHWS) was located over the extreme eastern Atlantic Ocean in late October 1842. While passing near Madeira, the storm produced a minimum pressure of 965 mbar (28.5 inHg), causing heavy damage there. Moving to the northeast, the cyclone struck southwestern Spain on October 29, with winds estimated at over 95 km/h (59 mph), which was strong enough to uproot trees and damage houses. Researchers estimated that the storm was becoming extratropical at or shortly after landfall; if tropical, the cyclone would be the only Atlantic tropical storm to make landfall in continental Europe. The storm was considered an analogue to Hurricane Vince in 2005.
- September 1848 – A hurricane travelled from the Caribbean to the east coast of the United States, eventually dissipating near the United Kingdom. It resulted in one of the earliest completed track maps for an Atlantic hurricane.
- September 1, 1883 – An extratropical storm, which previously passed near Bermuda as a major hurricane, crossed over the British Isles, producing hurricane-force winds and rough seas in London.
- September 6, 1884 – After moving across Newfoundland as a tropical storm, a system struck Ireland with gusty winds as an extratropical cyclone.
- September 6, 1887 – The remnants of Hurricane Ten produced strong winds along the northern Irish coastline.
- November 6, 1887 – The 1887 Halloween Tropical Storm that struck Florida became extratropical, moved across the Atlantic Ocean, and eventually brushed southern Ireland before striking France.

=== 1900–1980s ===
- October 2, 1906 – After tracking across the Azores, a former tropical storm dissipated near Wales, bringing rainfall and strong winds to the United Kingdom.
- September 7, 1917 – The remnants of Hurricane Three were noted just south of Iceland; impacts, if any, are unknown.
- September 26, 1922 – The remnants of Hurricane Two brought gale-force winds to parts of Wales.
- August 26–27, 1927 – The powerful remnants of the 1927 Nova Scotia hurricane moved over Iceland with a central pressure of 963 mbar (28.4 inHg). Hurricane-force winds were measured over the North Atlantic, though winds in Iceland only reached 65 km/h (40 mph).
- September 13–17, 1932 – The extratropical remnants of the 1932 Bahamas hurricane later tracked across Iceland, Jan Mayen Island, northern Scandinavia, and into the far northwestern Soviet Union. Maximum Sustained winds in Finland reached 83 km/h (52 mph) while Iceland experienced winds up to 74 km/h (46 mph).
- September 28, 1944 – The remnants of Hurricane Nine merged with another extratropical system over Iceland; impacts, if any, are unknown.
- October 16, 1944 – The remnants of Hurricane Twelve moved over the Iberian Peninsula; Maximum sustained winds reached 74 km/h (46 mph) in Seville, Spain.
- September 17, 1950 – Former Hurricane Dog dissipated near Ireland, after having crossed much of the Atlantic Ocean.
- September 17, 1953 – The remnants of Hurricane Dolly dissipated along the coast of Portugal.
- September 24–25, 1957 – The extratropical remnants of Hurricane Carrie brought strong winds, waves, and severe flooding to the British Isles, resulting in three fatalities.
- October 4, 1958 – The remnants of Hurricane Helene dissipated along the coast of Great Britain.
- September 17, 1961 – Hurricane Debbie struck Ireland as a hurricane-force extratropical low. Debbie produced among the lowest pressures in Europe from a post-tropical cyclone, with a pressure of 950 mbar (28 inHg) reported between Ireland and Scotland. At Malin Head in northwestern Ireland, a gust of 183 km/h (114 mph) was reported, which was the highest gust in a survey of post-tropical cyclones from 1960 to 2009. Sustained winds reached 126 km/h (78 mph) at the same location. The high winds caused heavy damage across Ireland, estimated at over $40 million (1961 USD). There were also 12 deaths in the country. High winds also affected Northern Ireland, killing six people. Debbie's remnants later impacted the Soviet Union.

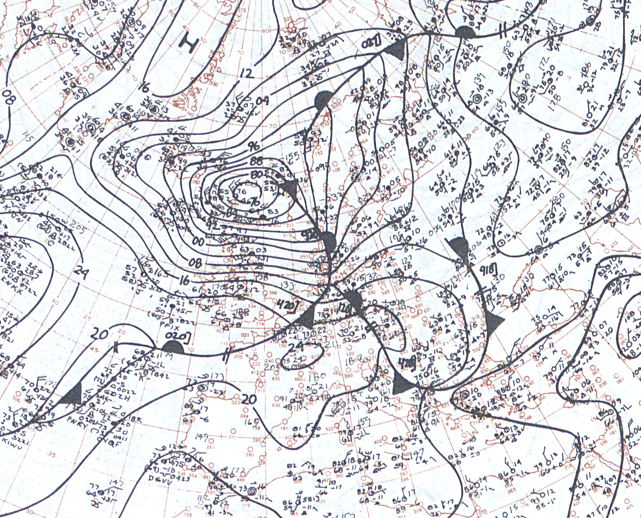
Surface weather analysis of the extratropical remnants of Hurricane Faith over northwestern Europe on September 6, 1966.

- September 6, 1966 – Hurricane Faith was officially declared extratropical to the north of Scotland, having tracked 13,000 km (8,100 mi) as a tropical cyclone. That day, a pressure of 960 mbar (28 inHg) was reported in the North Sea, along with winds of 167 km/h (104 mph). Faith capsized a boat off the coast of Denmark, killing one person, although the other 144 people on board were rescued. The storm later struck Norway with high winds and rainfall, causing flooding, and proceeded to move over the northern Soviet Union.
- September 21, 1967 – Hurricane Chloe evolved into an extratropical cyclone off the northern coast of France before moving over western Europe. Details on the storm's impact are unknown, though 14 people drowned when the Fiete Schulze sank in the Bay of Biscay.
- October 13, 1973 – Hurricane Fran evolved into a powerful extratropical cyclone as it approached the British Isles; it was absorbed by a cold front before moving through the region. Several vessels measured winds up to 95 km/h (59 mph) off the coasts of England and France.
- September 1978 – The remnants of Hurricane Flossie produced extreme winds over parts of Northern Scotland, with a peak value of 167 km/h (104 mph) between Orkney and Shetland.
- October 3, 1981 – The remnants of Hurricane Irene moved ashore in France with winds of about 55 km/h (34 mph).
- October 4, 1985 – The warmest October day on record was recorded at Basel, Switzerland due to the remnants of Hurricane Gloria.
- August 26, 1986 – Former Hurricane Charley moved through Ireland and Great Britain, later dissipating near Denmark. In Dublin, the storm dropped over 200 mm (7.9 in) of rainfall in a 24‑hour period, which set a record and caused severe flooding. Near the city, 451 buildings were flooded after two rivers overflowed their banks. In the Wicklow Mountains, the rainfall resulted in significant runoff, which caused erosion along the Cloghoge River. Record-breaking rainfall also occurred in Wales, causing flooding. Throughout Europe, Charley caused 11 deaths, and the Irish government paid $8.65 million (1986 USD) to pay for road and rail repairs.
- August 28, 1987 – The remnants of Hurricane Arlene dissipated over Spain,, which produced heavy rain over parts of southern Spain, as well as Portugal, reaching 127 mm (5 in) at Porto. Moisture from the storm also fueled rains in Italy.

=== 1990s ===
- August 29, 1991 – Former Hurricane Bob dissipated along the coast of Portugal.
- October 30, 1992 – The remnants of Hurricane Frances dissipated over northwestern Spain, causing heavy rains in northern Portugal.

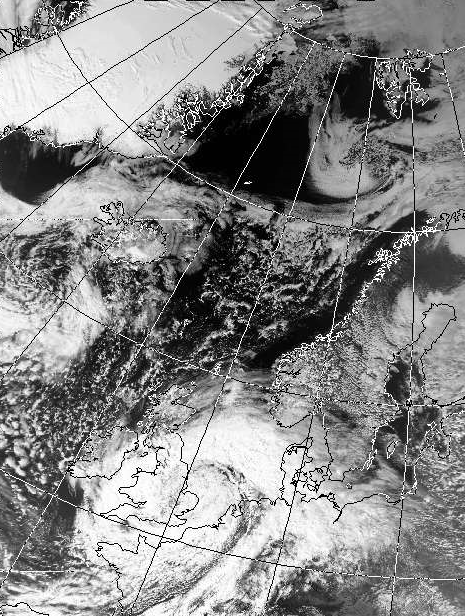
Remnants of Hurricane Charley in 1986 moving over Ireland and the United Kingdom as an extratropical storm

- September 13–15, 1993 – A pressure of 966 mbar (28.5 inHg) was measured before the remnants of Hurricane Floyd struck France. Off the coast of the British Isles and France, a few vessels became stranded in high seas and 113 km/h (70 mph) winds. The Meteorological Office and the National Rivers Authority stated that tides from the storm could be among the highest of the century. In France, gusts reached 129 km/h (80 mph). Heavy rains around London triggered flooding that closed a few major roads and inundated 50 homes.
- August 25, 1995 – The extratropical remnants of Hurricane Felix dissipated near the Faroe Islands.
- September 7–9, 1995 – After becoming a powerful mid-latitude cyclone, with a pressure of 957 mbar (28.3 inHg) and a core of hurricane-force winds, the remnants of Hurricane Iris struck the British Isles and France. The storm produced wind gusts up to 129 km/h (80 mph) in France and 97 km/h (60 mph) in Britain. More than 2.5 cm (1 in) of rain fell in parts of Devon.
- October 16, 1996 – The remnants of Tropical Storm Josephine merged with another extratropical low near Iceland.
- October 28, 1996 – As an extratropical storm, Hurricane Lili moved across Ireland and the United Kingdom, producing winds up to 148 km/h (92 mph) in Swansea in Wales. The storm left thousands without power and damaged about 500 cottages. A storm surge flooded areas along the River Thames, and high waves nearly grounded an oil rig in Somerset. Damage was estimated at $300 million (1996 USD, £150 million in 1996 pound sterlings), and there were six deaths.
- September 8, 1998 – The extratropical remnants of Hurricane Danielle merged with another storm north of Ireland, which produced strong waves and high winds in Great Britain that forced some evacuations. The storm also spawned a tornado in England.
- September 27, 1998 – Tropical Storm Ivan became extratropical near the Azores, and later affected portions of Europe.
- September 29, 1998 – Ireland and the United Kingdom experienced rains and gusty winds from the remnants of Hurricane Karl.
- October 3, 1998 – Former Hurricane Jeanne dissipated over Spain after striking Portugal.
- November 9, 1998 – The extratropical remnants of Hurricane Mitch produced 145 km/h (90 mph) wind gusts that left over 30,000 homes without power in Ireland. The winds also knocked down trees, one of which severely injured a driver.

=== 2000s ===
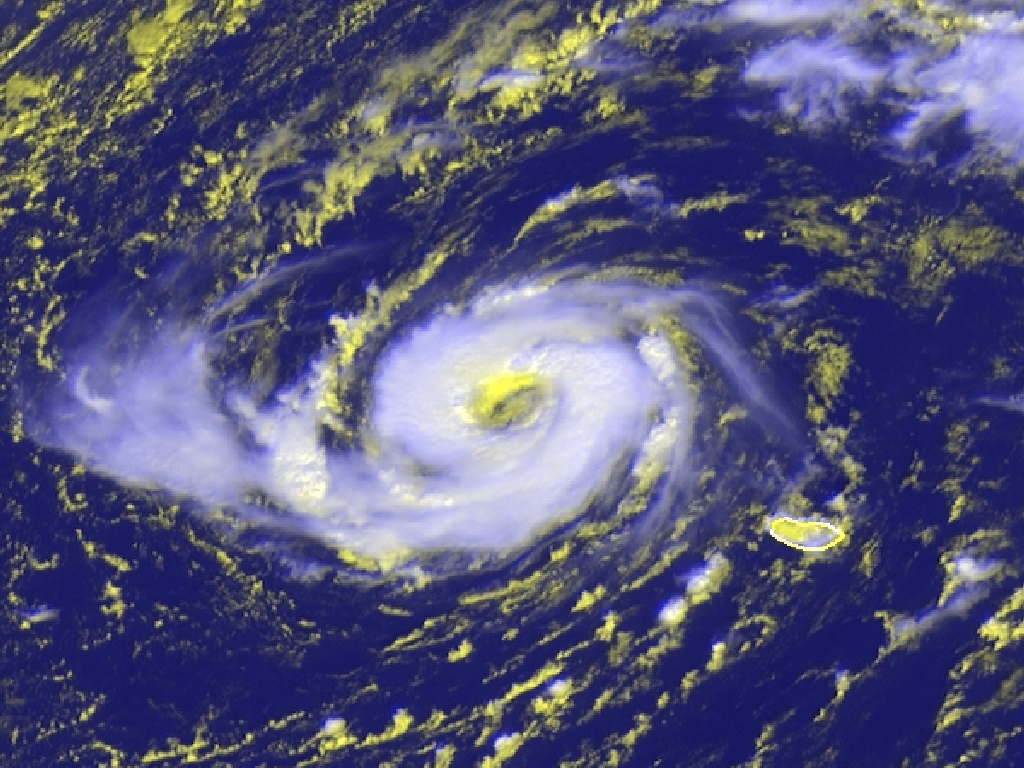
Hurricane Vince on October 9, 2005, northwest of the Madeira Islands

- August 24, 2000 – The extratropical remnants of Hurricane Alberto crossed western Iceland with gale-force winds.
- October 3, 2000 – As an extratropical storm, Hurricane Isaac moved across Northern Ireland and Scotland with gale-force winds, which swept the blue-winged warbler bird to the continent for the first time on record.
- October 10, 2000 – The National Hurricane Center tracked the remnants of Tropical Storm Leslie to a position just off the west coast of Ireland. It proceeded to move across the British Isles.
- October 23, 2002 – An extratropical storm absorbed Hurricane Kyle and later passed near the British Isles, causing one death due to rough seas.
- April 28, 2003 – After being absorbed by a cold front, the remnants of Tropical Storm Ana crossed the British Isles and dropped rainfall.
- October 10, 2003 – Former Hurricane Kate produced 110 km/h (68 mph) in Scotland after passing south of Iceland the previous day.
- August 8, 2004 – The remnants of Hurricane Alex produced 30 mm (1.2 in) of rainfall in portions of County Down in Northern Ireland.
- August 16, 2004 – Heavy rainfall from former Tropical Storm Bonnie, reaching 35 mm (1.4 in), caused flooding in Derry, Northern Ireland.
- August 23, 2004 – The third storm to affect Northern Ireland in the month, former Hurricane Charley, dropped about 25 mm (1 in) of rainfall.
- September 28, 2004 – The extratropical remnants of Hurricane Karl dissipated after striking northwestern Norway, producing high winds and surf but little damage.
- October 3, 2004 – Light rainfall of around 25 mm (1 in), associated with former Hurricane Lisa, affected Northern Ireland, and a tornado related to the system was reported in England.
- September 14, 2005 – The remnants of Hurricane Maria merged with an extratropical storm in the far northeastern Atlantic Ocean, dropping 130 mm (5.1 in) of rainfall on the island of Skye in Scotland. The system produced an atmospheric river over Norway, in combination with moisture from former Hurricane Nate. The systems dropped heavy rainfall, reaching about 150 mm (6 in) of rainfall in some areas. The rains amounted to about 5% of the annual precipitation total in just 12 hours. In Bergen – the second largest city in the country – the rains caused a mudslide that destroyed several homes, injured seven, and killed three people. This was the first heavy precipitation event named by The Norwegian Meteorological Institute, who named it extreme weather Kirstin.

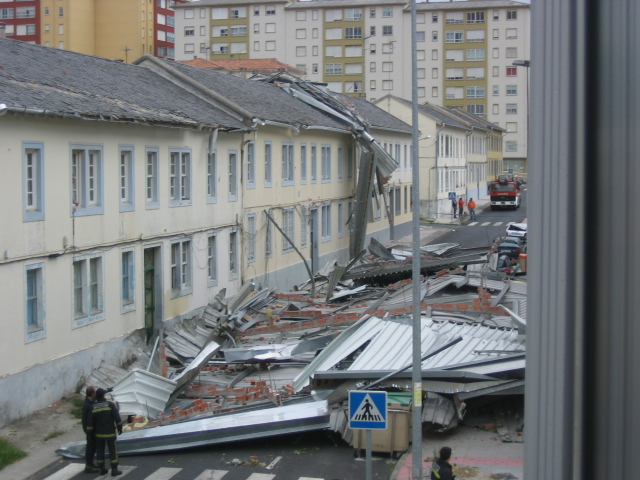
Wind damage from the remnants of Hurricane Gordon in Ferrol, Spain

- September 22, 2005 – Former Hurricane Ophelia moved across the Faroe Islands.
- September 29 – October 6, 2005 – Former Hurricane Rita moved across Northern Europe bringing fronts all over the continent.
- October 11, 2005 – Tropical Depression Vince made landfall near Huelva, Spain and dissipated shortly thereafter, making it the first tropical cyclone on record to reach the Iberian Peninsula. Vince previously formed near Madeira, and intensified into a hurricane before weakening. Vince produced wind gusts as strong as 77 km/h (48 mph) in Rota, Cádiz, and rainfall reached 84 mm (3.3 in) in Córdoba Province. The rains caused minor roadway flooding.
- June 19, 2006 – As an extratropical cyclone, former Tropical Storm Alberto crossed the British Isles and was absorbed by a frontal system. Winds were unusually strong for the month of June, with a peak gust of 100 km/h (62 mph) recorded at Capel Curig in Wales.
- September 21, 2006 – Hurricane Gordon became extratropical about 440 km (270 mi) west of the coast of Portugal and proceeded to pass just north of the Spanish province of Galicia before turning to the north and looping off western Ireland. In Spain, the former hurricane produced wind gusts of 183 km/h (114 mph) at Punta Candieira in Galicia, and waves of 7 m (23 ft) in height along the coast. The winds left about 100,000 people without power in Spain and caused four injuries there. High winds also left 126,000 people without power in Northern Ireland, where one injury occurred. The storm brought moist air that contributed to record warm temperatures across portions of the United Kingdom.
- September 28, 2006 – The remnants of Hurricane Helene merged with an extratropical storm over Scotland, producing 118 km/h (73 mph) wind gusts in the Outer Hebrides of Scotland.
- October 4, 2008 – A large extratropical storm absorbed former Tropical Storm Laura to the south of Iceland, which later caused road flooding in Great Britain.
- August 27, 2009 – The remnants of Hurricane Bill dropped 31 mm (1.2 in) of rainfall in Shap, England.
- October 6, 2009 – Tropical Storm Grace, which formed farther northeast than any other storm since 1972, became extratropical about 370 km (230 mi) southwest of Cork, Ireland. When the remnants moved over Wales and Great Britain, they dropped locally heavy rainfall, reaching 36.6 mm (1.44 in) in Sennybridge, Wales in a 24‑hour period.

=== 2010s ===
- September 12, 2011 – An extratropical cyclone, formerly Hurricane Katia, moved across northern Scotland, producing strong wind gusts that reached 158 km/h (98 mph) at the top of the Cairngorms mountain. The winds left thousands of houses without power, while heavy rainfall caused localized flooding. A falling tree killed a bus driver in County Durham, and the unsettled weather from Katia contributed to a car accident on the M54 motorway that killed one person. Katia was absorbed by a larger extratropical storm on September 13, which subsequently caused high winds and power outages in Estonia and Russia.
- October 6, 2011 – The remnants of Hurricane Ophelia combined with a cold front to produce 105 km/h (65 mph) winds and snowfall in Scotland.
- November 7–9, 2011 – Tropical Storm Rolf formed in the Mediterranean Sea, with the National Oceanic and Atmospheric Administration (NOAA) releasing bulletins on the system. It then made landfall in southeastern France, contributing to severe flooding in France, Spain, and Italy that resulted in 11 deaths. Rolf was the first tropical cyclone in the Mediterranean Sea to be officially monitored by NOAA.
- September 12, 2012 – The remnants of Hurricane Leslie struck Iceland with gusty winds, which left about 30,000 people without power after ice-laden lines were blown down.
- September 23, 2012 – Tropical Storm Nadine regenerated southeast of the Azores after having become extratropical a few days prior. The storm would become one of the longest-lasting Atlantic tropical cyclones. While it was nearly stationary, Nadine produced a plume of moisture that dropped heavy rainfall over the United Kingdom, reaching 130 mm (5.1 in) in Ravensworth. The rains flooded houses and disrupted roads and rails. In early October, the remnants of Nadine dropped heavy rainfall in Wales.
- October 26–27, 2012 – After moving ashore in central Portugal, the extratropical cyclone that was formerly Hurricane Rafael dissipated. In mountainous areas of southern France, wind gusts reached 168 km/h (104 mph). Just offshore Barcelona, Spain, three waterspouts formed, though all remained offshore.

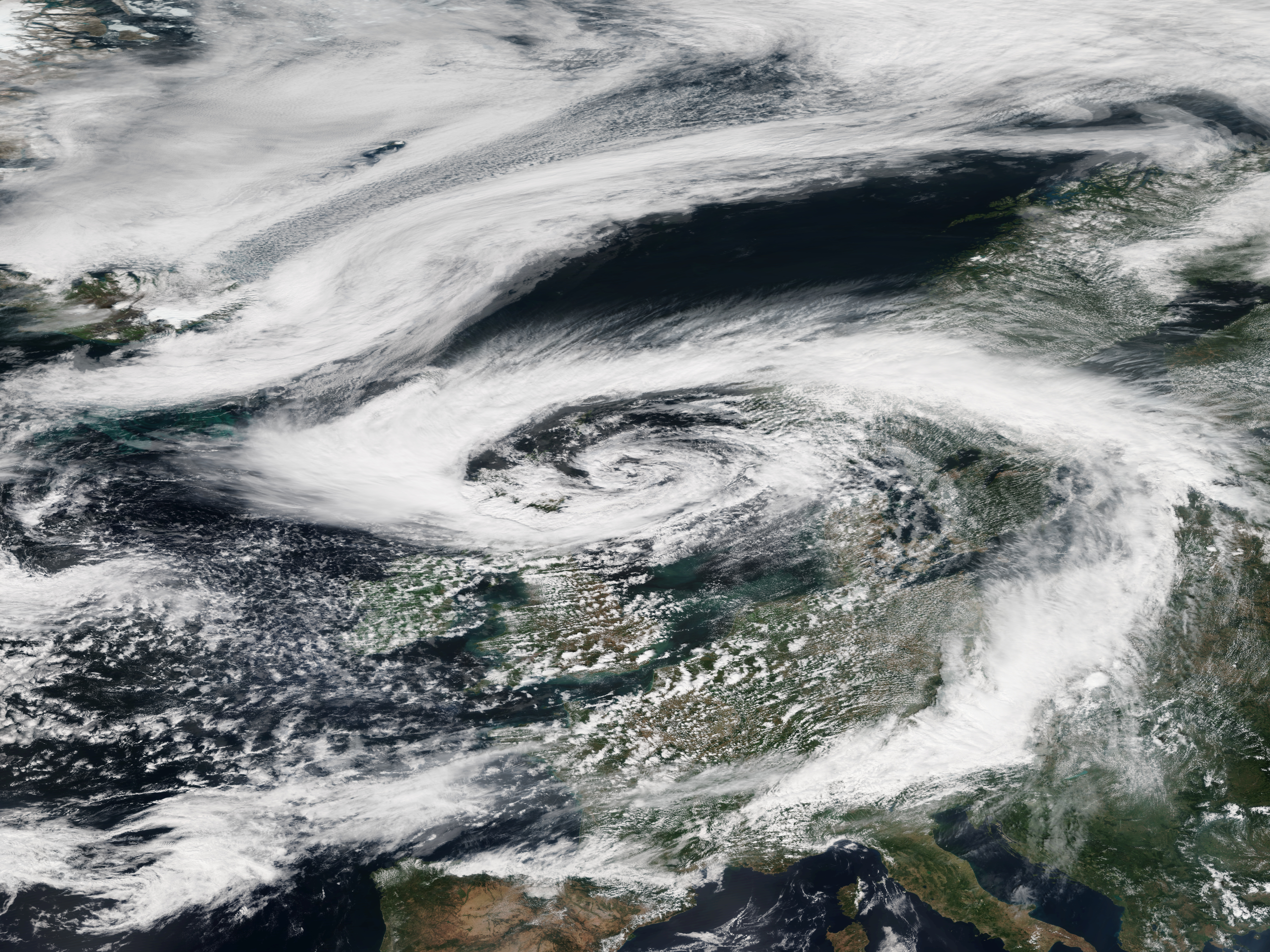
Extratropical cyclone formed from the remnants of Hurricane Bertha over Europe

- August 10–11, 2014 – The remnants of Hurricane Bertha brought heavy rainfall and high winds for the time of year to Ireland, the UK and northern France.
- August 31 – September 1, 2014 – The remnants of Hurricane Cristobal caused gusty winds and heavy rainfall in Iceland, especially in Reykjavík. The fire department received many calls of flooded buildings, while Reykjavík's airport recorded wind gusts as high as 100 km/h (62 mph).
- October 21–24, 2014 – The extratropical remnants of Hurricane Gonzalo reached Europe with wind gusts of 110 km/h (68 mph) recorded in Wales and the Isle of Wight. Downed trees blocked roads and strong winds disrupted transportation. In Southwick, West Sussex three people were injured by falling trees with one woman killed in London. Two men also died in separate accidents in Essex and Merseyside. The remnants then proceeded to batter Central Europe. Stuttgart had gusts up to 122 km/h (76 mph), Munich Airport up to 108 km/h (67 mph). Much snow fell in the Alps. As of October 23, Gonzalo's remnants had moved to the Aegean Sea. On October 24, rainfall "tied to the remnants of Hurricane Gonzalo" caused intense flooding in Athens, Greece.
- June 25–27, 2015 – Tropical Storm Bill's remnants caused flash flooding in North East England and brought warm temperatures across England and Wales.
- September 14–17, 2015 – Tropical Storm Henri's remnants left severe thunderstorms in Germany and France, producing three tornadoes, bringing winds as gusty as 135 km/h (84 mph) in the plains and more than 190 km/h (120 mph) over reliefs, and killing three people.
- October 11–15, 2015 – Hurricane Joaquin's remnants bought heavy rain across Iberia.
- November 15–16, 2015 – Hurricane Kate's remnants brought heavy rain and high winds to Wales.
- September 13–16, 2016 – Storm Stephanie, cyclonically looped across the Bay of Biscay, exhibited subtropical characteristics on September 15, according to Météo-France; first reported example of a "Biscane" (in analogy with Medicane (Mediterranean hurricanes)).
- October 16–17, 2017 – The remnants of Hurricane Ophelia hit Ireland, causing 3 deaths and power outages in Ireland, Northern Ireland, and Wales, with winds reaching almost 100 miles per hour. Over 1000 homes went without power in Scotland as well as causing winds of 76 miles per hour
- November 10–20, 2017 – The remnants of Tropical Storm Rina hit the United Kingdom and Ireland on the night of November 10 and into the following day.
- August 18–19, 2018 – The remnants of Tropical Storm Ernesto brought rainfall to Ireland and the United Kingdom. After undergoing an extratropical transition, Ernesto accelerated towards the British Isles. Storm Ernesto brought heavy rain, which caused some flooding, and wind gusts of up to 30–40 miles per hour (48–64 km/h). Ernesto's warmth humidity brought muggy conditions to the British Isles.
- September 17–18, 2018 – The remnants of Hurricane Helene brought strong winds to Ireland, the United Kingdom and Norway.
- October 13, 2018 – Hurricane Leslie transitioned to an extratropical cyclone, and on the same day made landfall in Portugal, causing damage throughout the country's central coast.
- October 16, 2018 – Hurricane Michael's remnants reached Portugal and Spain as an extratropical cyclone.
- November 3–4, 2018 – The extratropical remnants of Hurricane Oscar brought gale force winds to portions of Ireland and the United Kingdom.
- On September 12, 2019 – The remnants of Tropical Storm Gabrielle struck Ireland. Later, it struck Great Britain.
- September 24, 2019 – The extratropical remnants of Hurricane Humberto struck the British Isles.
- October 2–4, 2019 – The extratropical remnants of Hurricane Lorenzo affected the Azores and the United Kingdom.
- November 27–28, 2019 – The extratropical remnants of late-season storm Tropical Storm Sebastien struck England causing gale-force winds and triggering many flood alerts across the country.

=== 2020s ===
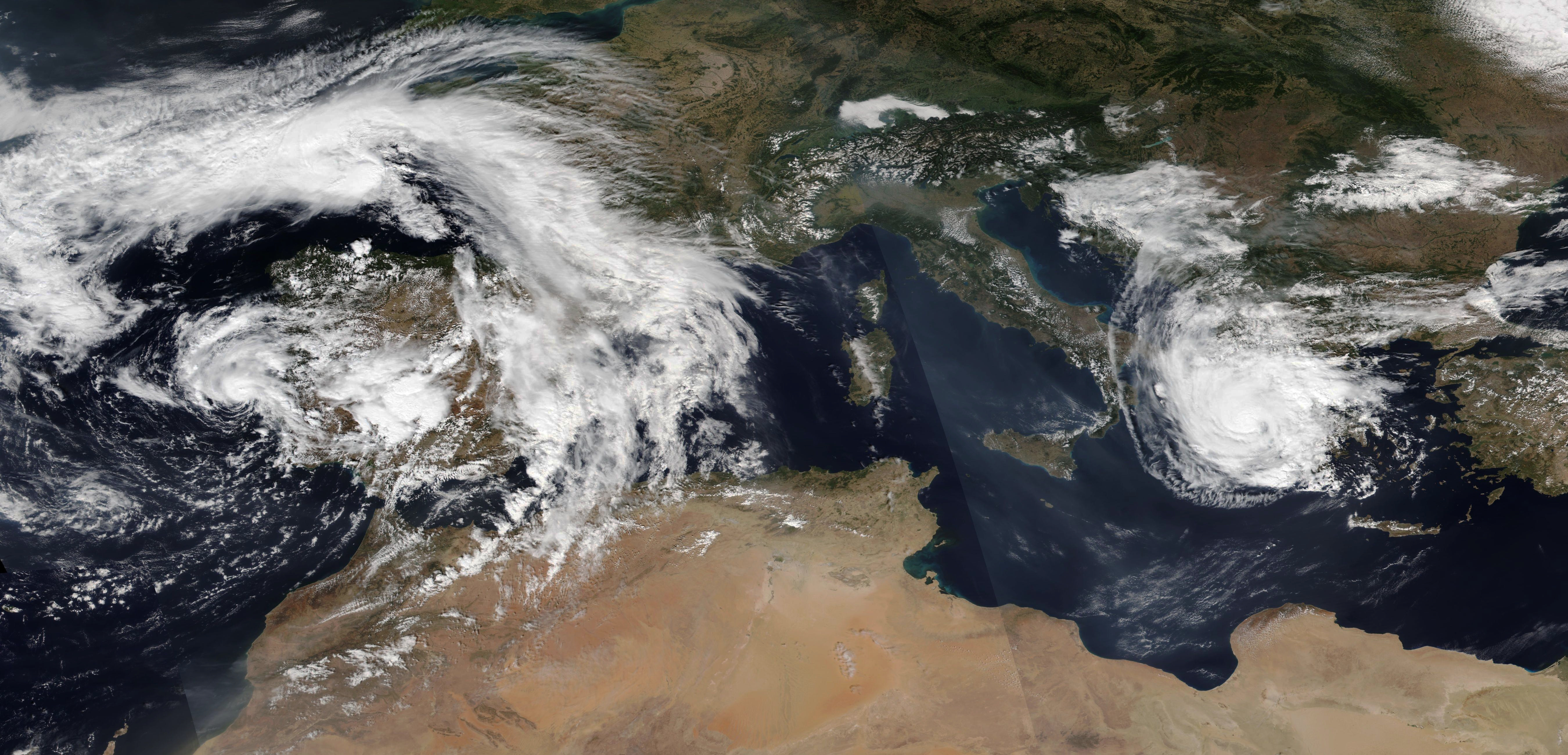
Subtropical Storm Alpha and Cyclone Ianos threatening Europe on September 18, 2020

- July 9–11, 2020 – The remnants of Tropical Storm Edouard affected the British Isles and northern Europe before dissipating over the Baltic Sea near Western Russia.
- September 9, 2020 – The remnants of Tropical Storm Omar briefly affected northern Scotland before finally dissipating.
- September 18, 2020 – Subtropical Storm Alpha made landfall in Portugal at peak intensity.
- November 1–2, 2020 – The remnants of Hurricane Zeta affected the British Isles.
- November 15, 2020 – A weakening Tropical Storm Theta passed close to Madeira.
- October 8, 2021 – Ex tropical remnants of Hurricane Sam passed by Iceland and Greenland.
- June 10–11 2022 – The extratropical low of Tropical Storm Alex passed between Iceland and the United Kingdom.
- September 12–15, 2022 – The remnants of Hurricane Danielle caused flooding and landslides in Portugal before dissipating offshore.
- October 11–13, 2024 – The extratropical remnants of Hurricane Kirk passed through France, Belgium, and Germany.
- October 18, 2024 – The remnants of Hurricane Leslie merged with another extratropical low. The system then triggers intense flooding in France and Italy.
- September 25–27, 2025 – The extratropical remnants of Hurricane Gabrielle passed through Portugal and Spain, causing flooding.
- October 3, 2025 – Remnant moisture from Hurricane Humberto contributed to the development of Storm Amy, which brought severe weather to the United Kingdom and Ireland.

== See also ==
- List of South America hurricanes
- List of United States hurricanes
- European windstorm (fully extratropical) – the main type of storms that occur in Europe
- Mediterranean tropical-like cyclone (partially-tropical) – storms that show a varying degree of similarity to Atlantic tropical cyclones
