= Tropical Storm Bill (2003) =

Atlantic tropical cyclone

- Tropical Storm Bill at peak intensity on June 30

Meteorological history
- Formed: June 29, 2003
- Dissipated: July 3, 2003

Tropical storm
- 1-minute sustained (SSHWS/NWS)
- Highest winds: 60 mph (95 km/h)
- Lowest pressure: 997 mbar (hPa); 29.44 inHg

Overall effects
- Fatalities: 4 direct
- Damage: $50.5 million (2003 USD)
- Areas affected: Yucatan Peninsula; Gulf Coast of the United States; Southeastern United States
- IBTrACS
- Part of the 2003 Atlantic hurricane season

Tropical Storm Bill was a tropical storm that affected the Gulf Coast of the United States in the summer of 2003. The second storm of the 2003 Atlantic hurricane season, Bill developed from a tropical wave on June 29 to the north of the Yucatán Peninsula. It slowly organized as it moved northward, and reached a peak of 60 miles per hour (97 km/h) shortly before making landfall in south-central Louisiana. Bill quickly weakened over land, and as it accelerated to the northeast, moisture from the storm, combined with cold air from an approaching cold front, produced an outbreak of 34 tornadoes. Bill became extratropical on July 2, and was absorbed by the cold front later that day.

Upon making landfall on Louisiana, the storm produced a moderate storm surge, causing tidal flooding. In a city in the northeastern portion of the state, the surge breached a levee, which flooded many homes in the town. Moderate winds combined with wet soil knocked down trees, which then hit a few houses and power lines, and left hundreds of thousands without electric power. Two people drowned from rough surf in Florida. Further inland, tornadoes from the storm produced localized moderate damage. Throughout its path, Tropical Storm Bill caused around $50 million in damage (2003 USD) and four deaths.

== Meteorological history ==
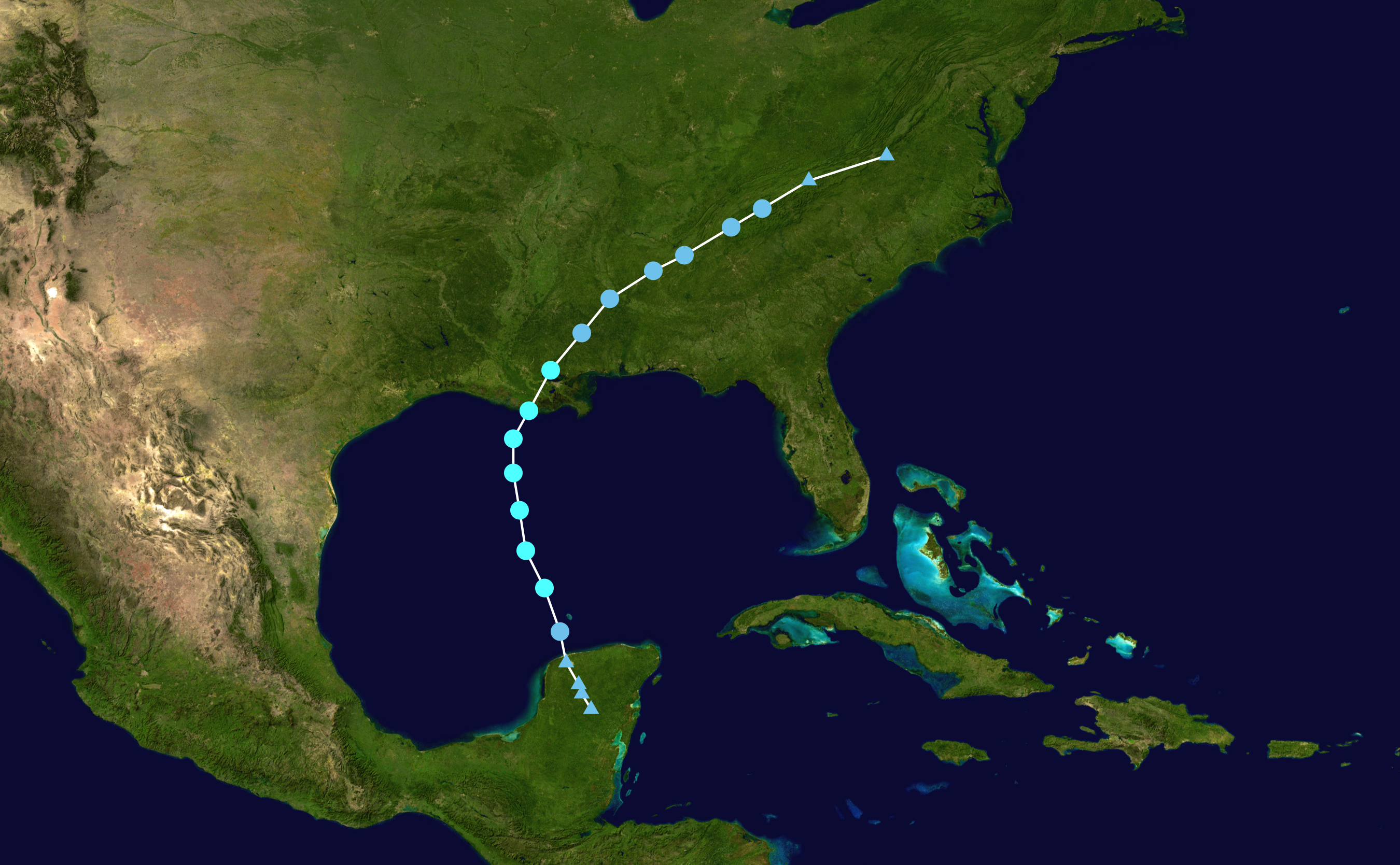
Map plotting the storm's track and intensity, according to the Saffir–Simpson scale Map key Saffir–Simpson scale Tropical depression (≤38 mph, ≤62 km/h) Tropical storm (39–73 mph, 63–118 km/h) Category 1 (74–95 mph, 119–153 km/h) Category 2 (96–110 mph, 154–177 km/h) Category 3 (111–129 mph, 178–208 km/h) Category 4 (130–156 mph, 209–251 km/h) Category 5 (≥157 mph, ≥252 km/h) Unknown Storm type Tropical cyclone Subtropical cyclone Extratropical cyclone, remnant low, tropical disturbance, or monsoon depression

A tropical wave developed scattered convection in the central Caribbean Sea on June 24, while interacting with an upper-level low. It moved slowly northwestward, and remained disorganized due to strong upper level wind shear. Late on June 27, the convection became slightly better organized around a broad low pressure area, though land interaction prevented further development as it moved towards the Yucatán Peninsula. The area of low pressure became better defined over the central Yucatán Peninsula, and after the system turned to the northwest, convection quickly organized while located over the warm waters of the Gulf of Mexico. On June 29, following the development of a closed circulation, the system organized into Tropical Depression Three while located about 40 miles (64 km) north of Progreso, Yucatán.

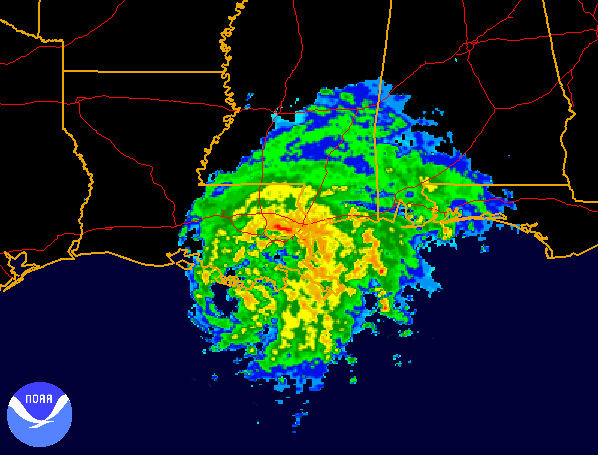
Radar image of Tropical Storm Bill's landfall in Louisiana

The depression quickly strengthened to become Tropical Storm Bill later on June 29. Operationally, the National Hurricane Center did not begin issuing advisories until it attained tropical storm status. Initially, the system resembled a subtropical cyclone, with the strongest winds and deep convection located far from the center, though it was classified tropical due to its tropical origins. The storm steadily intensified as wind shear decreased, and early forecasts from the National Hurricane Center mentioned the possibility of Bill intensifying to hurricane status if the low level circulation organized beneath the area of deepest convection. Bill turned to the north-northwest, and later to the north, as it moved around the periphery of a ridge of high pressure. On June 30, Tropical Storm Bill reached a peak intensity of 60 miles per hour (97 km/h), one hour before making landfall in southwestern Terrebonne Parish, Louisiana. It moved onshore at peak intensity, and quickly weakened to a depression over land as it accelerated to the northeast. Bill remained a tropical cyclone as it moved through the southeast United States, until it became attached to an approaching cold front on July 2 near the Tennessee–Virginia border. The remnant extratropical storm was absorbed by the cold front on July 3 near central Virginia, while the remnant low pressure area continued northeastward until reaching the Atlantic Ocean later on July 3.

== Preparations ==
Shortly after the storm formed, the National Hurricane Center issued a tropical storm watch from the southern end of Galveston Island to Morgan City, Louisiana. As a more northward motion occurred, the watch was canceled and replaced with a tropical storm warning from High Island, Texas, to Pascagoula, Mississippi. Shortly before the storm made landfall, the warning was discontinued between High Island and Cameron, Louisiana. The National Hurricane Center briefly issued a hurricane watch from Intracoastal City to Morgan City, but it was discontinued when Tropical Storm Bill failed to strengthen. Prior the storm making landfall, local National Weather Service offices issued flash flood watches and a tornado watch for large portions of the Gulf Coast.

The threat of Tropical Storm Bill caused 41 oil platforms and 11 oil rigs to evacuate. This resulted in a loss of production of over 71 thousand barrels (11,300 m^{3}) of oil and 610 million cubic feet (17,000,000 m^{3}) of gas.

The American Red Cross mobilized workers and brought food, water, and other supplies to Louisiana prior to the storm's arrival. At the request of Louisiana emergency management officials, the organization opened two shelters for residents in low-lying areas. Several floodgates in New Orleans were closed before the storm made landfall, and many universities and government offices were closed as well. Parishes along the coastline closed summer camps and prepared sand bags, boats, and high-wheeled vehicles. Officials declared a voluntary evacuation for Grand Isle, though few residents heeded the recommendation. Louisiana Governor Mike Foster declared a statewide state of emergency to easily make state resources available, and Mississippi Governor Ronnie Musgrove made a similar declaration for Harrison, Hancock, and Jackson Counties, where shelters were also opened. Officials in Mississippi ordered the evacuation of flood-prone areas in anticipation for a moderate storm surge and above-normal tides.

== Impact ==
Bill caused four direct deaths along its path, as well as minor to moderate damage. Damage estimates totaled to over $50 million (2003 USD, $87.5 million 2026 USD), primarily as a result of flooding or tornadic damage. Throughout its path, Bill spawned 34 tornadoes, ranking it fourteenth in the list of North Atlantic hurricanes generating the most tornadoes. The tornado outbreak was caused by wind shear, moist air from the storm, and cool air from an approaching cold front. In spite of the large numbers of tornadoes, most were weak and short-lived. Prior to forming, the storm produced rainfall along coastal areas of Mexico along the Bay of Campeche, peaking at nearly 4 inches (100 mm) in Yucatán, and over 3 inches (76 mm) in Campeche.

=== Western Gulf Coast ===
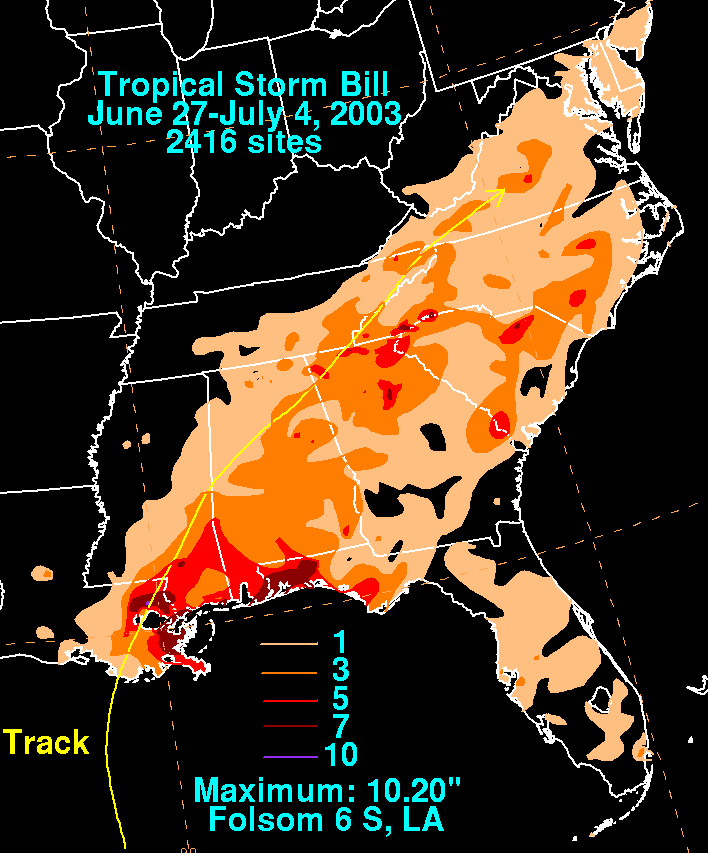
Rainfall totals from Tropical Storm Bill

The outer bands of Bill dropped light rain across southeastern Texas, peaking at 1.07 inches (27 mm) in Jamaica Beach. Sustained winds from the storm remained weak, and peak wind gusts were 20 miles per hour (32 km/h) in eastern Galveston County. Upon making landfall, Bill caused a storm surge of up to 3.81 feet (1.16 m) at Pleasure Pier. Effects in Texas were minimal, limited to minor beach erosion on the Bolivar Peninsula.

A moderate storm surge accompanied Tropical Storm Bill as it made landfall on Louisiana. In the state, the maximum reported surge was 5.8 feet (1.8 m), and it occurred at the Louisiana Universities Marine Consortium facility in Chauvin. In Montegut, the surge breached a levee which was still damaged from the effects of Hurricane Lili 9 months before. The breach flooded many homes in the town, forcing the evacuation of an entire neighborhood. As a result, 150 homes in the town were damaged, with half of them severely. The storm surge affected numerous low-lying cities in southeastern Louisiana by flooding roadways, including the only road to Grand Isle, stranding residents and visitors. The road was opened a day after the storm as floodwaters receded. The floodwaters entered a few homes and businesses in St. Tammany Parish. Damage from the storm surge totaled $4.1 million (2003 USD). Rough waves sank two boats offshore; their occupants were rescued.

The tornado outbreak associated with the storm began with an F0 in St. Bernard Parish that destroyed a boat house. A short-lived F1 tornado touched down in Reserve, striking a private high school, where it destroyed half of one classroom and damaged several others. Later, the F1 tornado passed through a trailer park and severely damaged or destroyed 20 trailers. One trailer with a woman and three children was lifted into the air and dropped 30 feet (9.1 m) away; four occupants were injured, none of them seriously. Damage from the tornado amounted to $2 million (2003 USD, $3.5 million 2026 USD). A third tornado, rated an F0, struck Orleans Parish, damaging a car and a portion of a roof.

Winds of 35 to 45 mph (56–72 km/h) were common across southeastern Louisiana, with the highest sustained wind being 53 miles per hour (85 km/h) in Chauvin and a peak gust of 62 miles per hour (100 km/h) on the northern end of the Lake Pontchartrain Causeway. The winds knocked trees and tree branches into power lines, leaving 224,000 residents without power. The storm dropped moderate to heavy amounts of precipitation, peaking at 10.2 inches (260 mm) at a location 6 miles (9.7 km) south of Folsom. The rainfall led to flash flooding, which inundated roads and cars and overwhelmed local drainage capacities. The rainfall also led to overflown rivers and creeks, resulting in flooding along the Tangipahoa River in southern Tangipahoa Parish, and the Bogue Falaya and Tchefuncte River in St. Tammany Parish. The Bogue Falaya River crested at 57 feet (17 m) on July 1, 12 feet (3.7 m) above flood stage, which became a record for the recording station. The flooding damaged several structures and roadways. Less severe river flooding occurred in Washington and Livingston Parishes. In all, damage in Louisiana totaled to $44 million (2003 USD, $77 million 2026 USD).

=== Eastern Gulf Coast ===
Fujita scale
| Scale | Speed | | Damage |
| Scale | mph | km/h | Damage |
|---|---|---|---|
| F0 | < 73 | < 117 | Light |
| F1 | 73–112 | 117–180 | Moderate |
| F2 | 113–157 | 181–253 | Considerable |
| F3 | 158–206 | 254–332 | Severe |
| F4 | 207–260 | 333–418 | Devastating |
| F5 | 261–318 | 419–512 | Incredible |

Upon making landfall, Bill produced a peak storm surge of 4.99 feet (1.52 m) in Waveland, Mississippi. The storm surge led to beach erosion, damage to piers, and flooded roadways, with damage from the surge amounting to around $1 million (2003 USD, $1.75 million 2026 USD). The maximum sustained wind from the storm recorded in Mississippi was 43 miles per hour (69 km/h), at the Gulfport-Biloxi International Airport, while the airport and Keesler Air Force Base both reported a peak wind gust of 52 miles per hour (84 km/h). Tropical Storm Bill dropped moderate to heavy rainfall across the state, peaking at 9.49 inches (241 mm) in Van Cleave. The moderate wind gusts, along with the saturated ground, downed trees in several locations. 34 roads in Pike and Walthall Counties were blocked by fallen trees, and two homes were damaged. Additionally, power outages were reported near the coast. The rainfall flooded streets in various portions of the state and led to overflown rivers. An overflown creek in Pearl River County flooded structures and roadways. The outer rainbands of Bill produced a weak tornado that touched down briefly in Waveland, blowing down several trees which resulted in minor damage to roofs. Statewide damage accrued to $5 million (2003 USD, $8.75 million 2026 USD), primarily from flooding.

As Tropical Storm Bill made landfall on Louisiana, its effects were felt in the Alabama coast as well, as heavy surf and tidal flooding pounded the coastline of the state. High waters closed a road to Dauphin Island and portions of a road along Mobile Bay. Bill dropped over 3 inches (76 mm) of rain across the southern half of Alabama, with isolated locations receiving over 8 inches (200 mm). Due to wet conditions for months preceding the storm, rainfall from Bill led to flash flooding in many counties. The deluge led to overflown rivers and streams, and left several roadways temporarily impassable from high floodwaters. Saturated grounds and wind gusts of 30 to 35 mph (48–56 km/h) downed numerous trees. Many downed trees landed on power lines, which caused power outages for around 19,000 people. One downed tree destroyed a car, and another damaged a roof of a house. In Lee County, a man was required to be rescued after driving through high flood waters. Roadway flooding resulted in a few minor traffic accidents. Also, the outer bands of the storm spawned an F1 tornado in Crenshaw County. Early in its path, it was narrow, and damage was limited to downed trees, two destroyed sheds, and a few houses experiencing light shingle damage or damage from fallen trees. Later, it expanded to reach a width of 1,800 feet (550 m) as it moved northwestward. The tornado destroyed the roofs of two houses, one of which experienced damage to its walls. The tornado dissipated eight minutes after its 3 miles (4.8 km) path began, resulting in $200,000 in damage (2003 USD, $350,036 2026 USD) and only slight injuries A second tornado, rated F0 in the Fujita scale, occurred in southwestern Montgomery County. A small tornado with a width of only 180 feet (55 m), it moved to the northwest and tore down a few trees that fell onto a mobile home, a house, and two cars. The tornado dissipated six minutes after its 5 miles (8.0 km) path began. Throughout Alabama, Tropical Storm Bill caused around $300,000 in damage (2003 USD, $525,054 2026 USD).

Rainfall from the storm began affecting Florida a few days before the storm formed, and locations in the southern portion of the state received over 3 inches (76 mm) of rain. Along the Florida Panhandle, Bill dropped over 8 inches (200 mm) of rain as it made landfall, closing several roads or leaving them impassable due to flooding. A stationary line of thunderstorms in Okaloosa County produced downpours of up to 6 inches (150 mm) in one hour, resulting in flash flooding which washed out a portion of a bridge. In Bay County, heavy rainfall and flooding damaged 40 homes, while several residents in an apartment in Parker needed to be rescued by boat from the floodwaters. Rough surf produced by the storm killed two swimmers at Panama City Beach, while a dozen had to be rescued. Part of the tornado outbreak spawned by the storm extended into northern Florida. Damage in Florida totaled to around $1 million (2003 USD, $1.75 million 2026 USD).

=== Southeastern U.S. ===
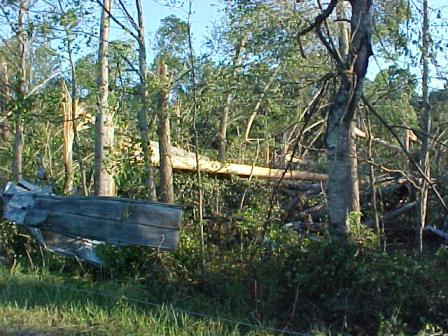
Damaged trees from tornado in Morgan County

Tropical Storm Bill dropped light rainfall of around 1 inch (25 mm) in northeastern Arkansas and southeastern Missouri, and over 5 inches (130 mm) in isolated parts of eastern Tennessee. The storm also produced moderate rainfall in northwestern Georgia, which peaked at 7.1 inches (180 mm) in Monroe. Areas in southeastern Georgia received generally around 1 inch (25 mm); some coastal areas did not receive any precipitation from the storm. Rainfall resulted in flooding in numerous locations around the Atlanta metropolitan area, leaving some roads impassable or closed. The combination of moist air from the south, cool temperatures from a cold front to the north, and low pressures led to the development of supercells throughout Georgia and South Carolina, several of which produced tornadoes. An F1 tornado touched down 3 miles (4.8 km) north-northeast of Pennington; first it passed through a farm, causing severe damage to two dairy sheds, a John Deere tractor, and three metal storage buildings. The tornado destroyed a hay barn, a carport, and a car inside the carport as well, while also causing a tree to fall and kill one cow. The tornado passed through a forested area, where it toppled or sheared off hundreds of trees. As it entered a more urban area, it downed 30 isolated trees, some of which fell on a portion of Interstate 20, temporarily closing the roadway. The tornado damaged seven houses, primarily to roof damage, although one experienced damage to several windows, while another had a utility trailer and a car damaged by fallen trees; a commercial building was damaged as well. An F2 tornado was reported in Clito, which knocked down trees and damaged mobile homes. Severe thunderstorms from the remnants of Bill caused considerable damage to a house near Louisville and knocked down several trees. Moreover, a tornado was briefly associated with the storms. Bill also caused thunderstorms in Kite which uprooted several trees onto a car and a house. One man in Atlanta died due to a falling tree. Damage in Georgia totaled to $244,500 (2003 USD, $427,919 2026 USD).

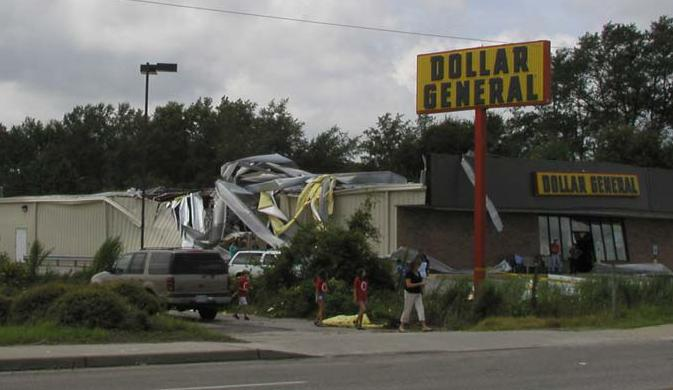
Tornado damage in Hampton, South Carolina

The tornado outbreak spawned by Bill was the greatest in the Charleston, South Carolina National Weather Service area since the outbreak provoked by Hurricane Earl in 1998. One such tornado was an F1 that struck Hampton, which uprooted trees and downed power lines. The tornado severely damaged a Dollar General store, while several houses were damaged from fallen trees. An F1 tornado also touched down near Smoaks, which uprooted several trees, resulted in a crushed car due to a fallen tree, caused severe roof damage to a mobile home, and killed one dog. The storm produced heavy rainfall in the northern portion of the state, with some locations reporting over 7 inches (180 mm). The rainfall resulted in flash flooding in areas, which caused some damage.

In North Carolina, the remnants of the storm dropped around 5 inches (130 mm) in the east-central part of the state, while the southwestern portion of the state received totals of over 7 inches (180 mm). In Raleigh, a boy drowned from the floodwaters. The tornado outbreak from the storm extended into North Carolina, though specifics are unknown. Bill produced light to moderate precipitation in the Mid-Atlantic, including over 5 inches (130 mm) in central Virginia. In Virginia, a line of thunderstorms from the system produced small amounts of hail in Falls Church. The tornado outbreak associated with Bill ended in New Jersey; a narrow F0 tornado briefly touched down in a marsh near Goshen. The tornado remained away from the city, and caused no damage or injuries.

== Aftermath ==
By one day after the storm, power companies restored electricity to 151,000 customers. Citizens in Montegut circulated a petition for a class-action lawsuit in response to the levee failure. The American Red Cross set up a church in Reserve as an emergency shelter. Only five people stayed the first night, resulting in the organization to convert it to a family services center. Over 100 families asked for food assistance. The Red Cross also set up a shelter in Houma, where 14 people stayed.

== See also ==
- Tropical cyclones in 2003
- Weather of 2003
- Other storms of the same name
- List of Florida hurricanes (2000–present)
- List of North Carolina hurricanes (2000–present)
- Hurricane Cindy (2005)
- Tropical Storm Bill (2015)
