= Maliksi =

Maliksi (also spelled Malicsi or Malixi) is a Tagalog-language surname. Notable people with the surname include:

- Allein Maliksi (born 1987), Filipino basketball player
- Ayong Maliksi (1938–2021), Filipino politician

== Other uses ==
- List of storms named Maliksi
