= List of storms named Bob =

The name Bob was used for three tropical cyclones in the North Atlantic Ocean, and one in the South Pacific Ocean.

In the North Atlantic:

- Hurricane Bob (1979), hit Louisiana, killing one and causing US$20 million in damage; the first hurricane in the Atlantic to have a male name
- Hurricane Bob (1985), crossed Florida as a tropical storm and made landfall again in South Carolina; caused five deaths and US$20 million in damage
- Hurricane Bob (1991), brushed North Carolina, then struck New England and the Canadian Maritimes, killing 18 and causing almost US$1.5 billion in damage

The name Bob was retired in the spring of 1992, and was replaced by Bill in the 1997 season.

In the South Pacific:

- Cyclone Bob (1977), passed near Vanuatu and New Caledonia
