= List of storms named Phyllis =

The name Phyllis has been used for 12 tropical cyclones in the West Pacific Ocean:

- Typhoon Phyllis (1953) (T5310, 11W) – a Category 1-equivalent typhoon.
- Typhoon Phyllis (1958) (T5803) – a Category 5-equivalent super typhoon.
- Typhoon Phyllis (1960) (T6028, 31W) – a Category 3-equivalent typhoon.
- Tropical Storm Phyllis (1963) (T6326, 41W, Sisang)
- Tropical Storm Phyllis (1966) (T6609, 09W) – briefly limited the number of American bombing raids during the Vietnam War.
- Typhoon Phyllis (1969) (T6901, 01W) – a Category 2-equivalent typhoon that affected Micronesia.
- Typhoon Phyllis (1972) (T7206, 07W) – a Category 4-equivalent typhoon that flooded over 6,000 homes in Japan.
- Typhoon Phyllis (1975) (T7505, 07W, Etang) – a Category 4-equivalent typhoon that made landfall in Japan, causing 77 fatalities and flooding over 5,000 homes.
- Typhoon Phyllis (1978) (T7825, 28W) – a Category 2-equivalent typhoon that did not affect land.
- Tropical Storm Phyllis (1981) (T8110, 12W) – a severe tropical storm that did not affect land.
- Typhoon Phyllis (1984) (T8418, 20W) – a Category 1-equivalent typhoon that did not affect land.
- Typhoon Phyllis (1987) (T8724, 24W, Trining) – a Category 3-equivalent typhoon that capsized a ferry boat offshore Samar.

== See also ==
- List of storms named Bilis – a similar name that has also been used in the West Pacific Ocean.
