= List of storms named Bill =

The name Bill has been used for five tropical cyclones in the Atlantic Ocean and three in the West Pacific Ocean.

In the Atlantic Ocean:

Bill replaced the name Bob following the latter's retirement after the 1991 season.

- Hurricane Bill (1997) – a Category 1 hurricane that affected Newfoundland
- Tropical Storm Bill (2003) – made landfall in Louisiana
- Hurricane Bill (2009) – a Category 4 hurricane that affected the East Coast of the United States and Atlantic Canada
- Tropical Storm Bill (2015) – made landfall in Texas
- Tropical Storm Bill (2021) – affected the East Coast of the United States and Atlantic Canada

In the West Pacific Ocean:

- Typhoon Bill (1981) (T8119, 19W) – a Category 2-equivalent typhoon that did not affect land
- Typhoon Bill (1984) (T8425, 28W, Welpring) – a Category 4-equivalent super typhoon that affected the Caroline Islands, Mariana Islands, and Philippines
- Tropical Storm Bill (1988) (T8809, 08W) – made landfall in China and caused 110 fatalities

== See also ==
Similar names that have been used for tropical cyclones:

- List of storms named Bilis – also used in the West Pacific Ocean
- List of storms named Billy – used in the Australian region
