= List of storms named Bilis =

The name Bilis (Tagalog: bilis, [bɪ.ˈlɪs]) has been used for two tropical cyclones in the western North Pacific Ocean. The name was contributed by the Philippines and means speed in Tagalog.

- Typhoon Bilis (2000) (T0010, 18W, Isang) – made landfall in Taiwan at Category 5 strength and China as a strong typhoon.
- Tropical Storm Bilis (2006) (T0604, 05W, Florita) – a severe tropical storm that affected the Philippines, Taiwan, and China, causing over 800 fatalities.

The name Bilis was retired following the 2006 Pacific typhoon season and was replaced with Maliksi.

== See also ==
Similar names that have been used for tropical cyclones:

- List of storms named Bill – used in the Atlantic Ocean and the West Pacific Ocean.
- List of storms named Phyllis – also used in the West Pacific Ocean.
