= List of storms named Maliksi =

The name Maliksi (Tagalog: maliksi, [mɐ.lɪk.ˈsɪʔ]) has been used for three tropical cyclones in the West Pacific Ocean, replacing Bilis on the naming lists. The name, contributed by the Philippines, means fast in Tagalog.

- Severe Tropical Storm Maliksi (2012) (T1219, 20W) – passed near Iwo Jima.
- Severe Tropical Storm Maliksi (2018) (T1805, 06W, Domeng) – remained at sea, but brought rainfall to the Philippines and Japan.
- Tropical Storm Maliksi (2024) (T2402, 02W) – a weak tropical storm that made landfall in South China.

== See also ==
- Storm Malik (2022) – a European windstorm with a similar name.

Preceded by Tirou	Pacific typhoon season names Maliksi	Succeeded by Gaemi
