= Tropical Storm Bill (2015) =

Atlantic tropical storm in 2015

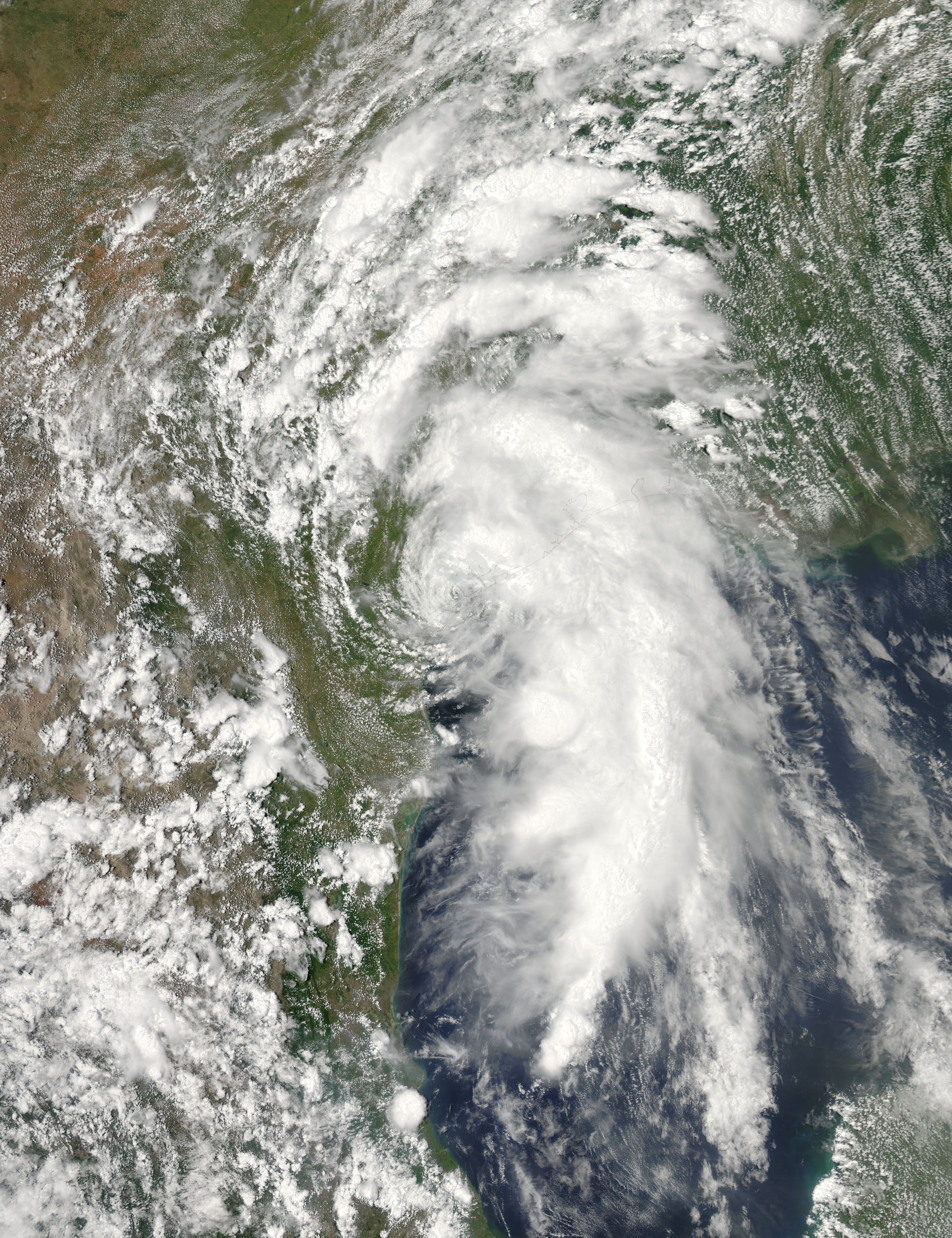
- Tropical Storm Bill shortly after landfall in Texas on June 16

Meteorological history
- Formed: June 16, 2015
- Remnant low: June 18, 2015
- Dissipated: June 23, 2015

Tropical storm
- 1-minute sustained (SSHWS/NWS)
- Highest winds: 60 mph (95 km/h)
- Lowest pressure: 997 mbar (hPa); 29.44 inHg

Overall effects
- Fatalities: 8 direct, 1 indirect
- Damage: $100 million (2015 USD)
- Areas affected: Central America, Yucatán Peninsula, Southern and Midwestern United States, Northeastern United States, Atlantic Canada, British Isles
- IBTrACS
- Part of the 2015 Atlantic hurricane season

Tropical Storm Bill was a tropical cyclone that produced widespread rainfall across East Texas, Oklahoma, the Midwest, and Mid-Atlantic. The second named storm of the 2015 Atlantic hurricane season, Bill developed from a broad area of low pressure over the northwestern Gulf of Mexico on June 16. Because the system was already producing tropical storm force winds, it was immediately classified as Tropical Storm Bill. Initially continuing northwestward, Bill re-curved west-northwestward later on June 16. Around 12:00 UTC, the storm peaked with maximum sustained winds of 60 mph (95 km/h). Just under five hours later, Bill made landfall near on Matagorda Island, Texas, at the same intensity. The cyclone weakened to a tropical depression and turned northward early on June 17. Bill remained a tropical cyclone until late on June 18, when it degenerated into a remnant low. The remnant low moved east-northeastward until dissipating over West Virginia on June 21.

The precursor to Bill produced widespread heavy rain in Central America. In Guatemala, flooding affected more than 100 homes while a landslide killed two people. Two others died in Honduras due to flooding with two more missing. Heavy rains fell across parts of the Yucatán Peninsula, with accumulations peaking at 13 in (330 mm) in Cancún, the highest daily total seen in the city in nearly two years. One person died from electrocution in the city. In Texas, flooding was exacerbated by record rainfall in some areas in May. A number of roads were inundated and several water rescues were required in Alice and San Antonio. Major traffic jams occurred in the Houston and Dallas areas. Coastal flooding left minor damage, mostly in Galveston and Matagorda counties. One death occurred when a boy was swept into a culvert. In Oklahoma, numerous roads were also inundated by water. Interstate 35 was closed near Turner Falls due to a rockslide and near Ardmore because of high water. There were two fatalities in Oklahoma, both from drowning. There was also flooding in several others states. Across the United States, Bill was responsible for approximately $100 million in damage.

== Meteorological history ==
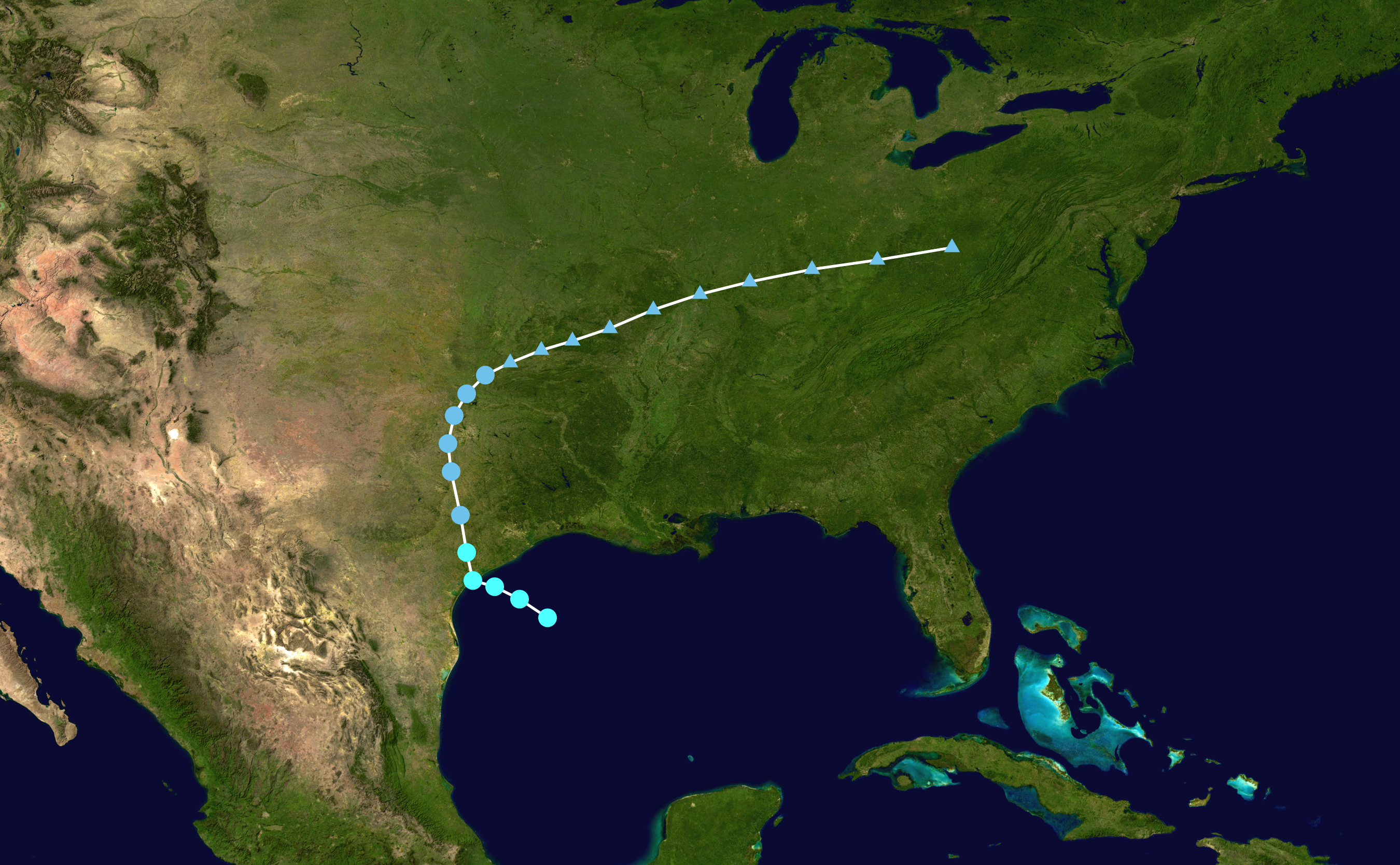
Map plotting the storm's track and intensity, according to the Saffir–Simpson scale Map key Saffir–Simpson scale Tropical depression (≤38 mph, ≤62 km/h) Tropical storm (39–73 mph, 63–118 km/h) Category 1 (74–95 mph, 119–153 km/h) Category 2 (96–110 mph, 154–177 km/h) Category 3 (111–129 mph, 178–208 km/h) Category 4 (130–156 mph, 209–251 km/h) Category 5 (≥157 mph, ≥252 km/h) Unknown Storm type Tropical cyclone Subtropical cyclone Extratropical cyclone, remnant low, tropical disturbance, or monsoon depression

The National Hurricane Center (NHC) first noted the potential of the formation of a tropical cyclone in the Gulf of Mexico during the mid-afternoon hours of June 12. At the time, an upper-level trough was producing disorganized showers and thunderstorms over the northwestern Caribbean Sea, Belize, and the Yucatán Peninsula. However, the NHC assessed a low probability as atmospheric conditions were assessed to be unfavorable in the Gulf of Mexico. Moving northwestward, the system tracked over the Yucatán Peninsula, and development chances increased as forecasts showed a more favorable environment within the Gulf of Mexico. Early on June 14, the trough began to interact with an upper-level low over the Gulf of Mexico, producing additional showers over portions of Central America. Later that day, Hurricane Hunters aircraft reconnaissance began investigating the system, and discovered an ill-defined but intact and broad low-pressure area over the south-central Gulf of Mexico. The system continued to possess an elongated circulation through June 15, but on June 16, reconnaissance aircraft indicated that the storm had become sufficiently organized to be considered a tropical cyclone. As winds were already found to have met the threshold for a tropical storm, the NHC began issuing advisories on Tropical Storm Bill at 03:00 UTC that day, skipping the tropical depression classification.

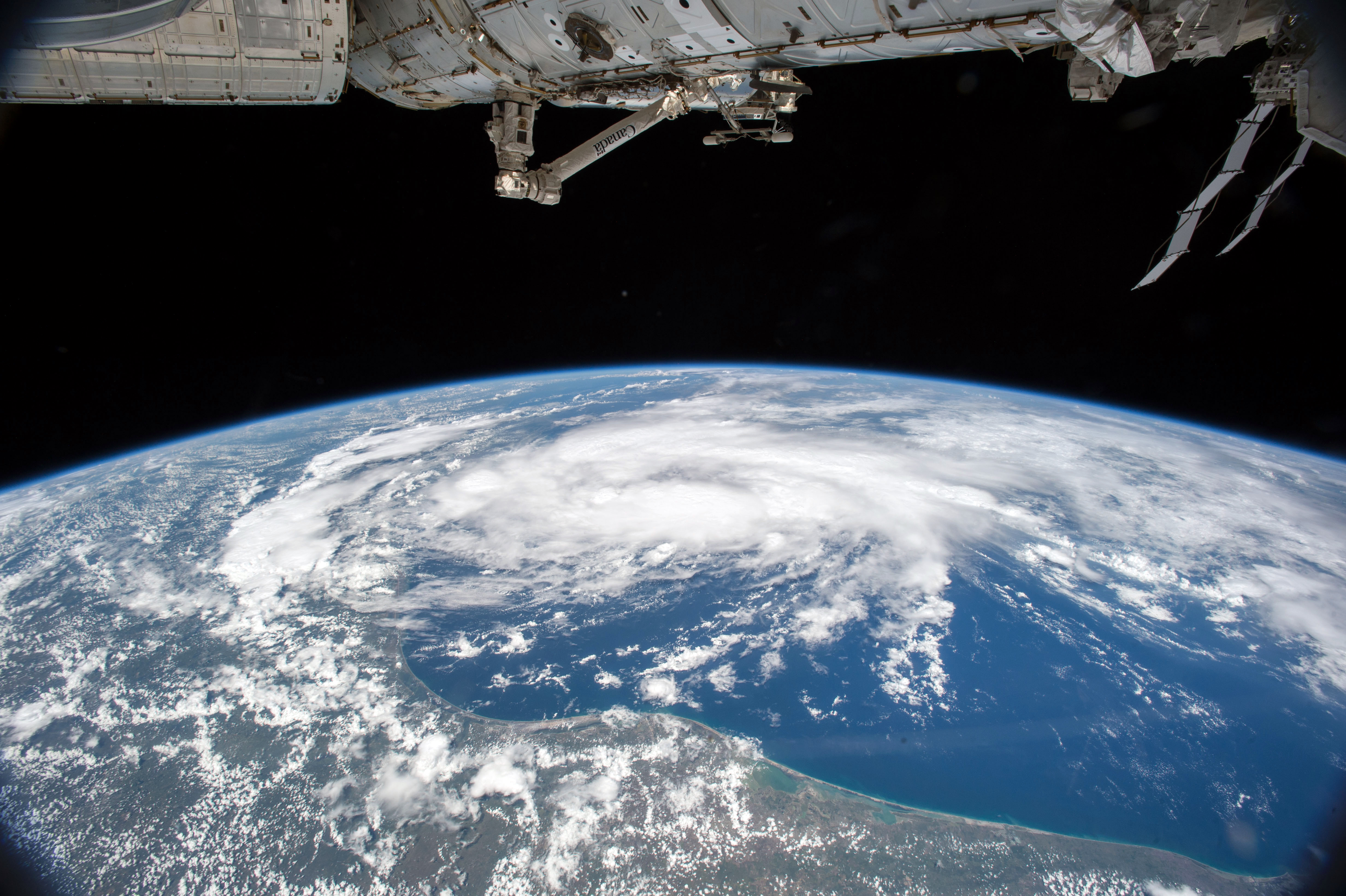
View of Tropical Storm Bill approaching Texas from the ISS

Moving towards the west-northwest and already near the United States Gulf Coast, the NHC's official forecast at the time of Bill's formation indicated that the storm would not have much time to strengthen over water. However, meteorologists Jeff Masters and Bob Henson of Weather Underground noted the possibility of Bill strengthening over land via the brown ocean effect due to floods in the previous month that helped saturate soils in Texas and Oklahoma. The cyclone's organization remained steady as the storm approached the coast, with most of the convection taking place around the storm's eastern half, with rainbands primarily occupying the eastern and southern portions of Bill's circulation. At 15:00 UTC on June 16, Bill reached its peak intensity with maximum sustained winds of 60 mph (95 km/h) and a minimum barometric pressure of 997 mbar (hPa; 29.44 inHg) as the storm was located 15 mi (20 km) south of Port O'Connor, Texas. At peak intensity, Bill made landfall on Matagorda Island at 16:45 UTC and began moving into inland Texas. At 09:00 UTC on June 17, Bill was downgraded to tropical depression intensity, though it maintained an organized structure. The next day, Bill had rapidly deteriorated as it moved northeastward. However, the system's strength slowly weakened. Operationally, it was announced that Bill stayed tropical throughout most of its lifetime, being declared a remnant low on June 20 by the WPC, however the NHC's post storm analysis revealed that Bill had degraded into a remnant low on June 18, while the storm was situated over Tulsa, Oklahoma. Bill's remnant low continued to move eastward for several more days, before being absorbed by another extratropical system on June 23.

== Preparations and impact ==
Across the United States, Bill was responsible for four deaths and approximately $36.2 million in property damage. According to the reinsurance company Aon Benfield, total economic losses related to the storm exceeded $100 million with private insurance companies reporting $60 million in losses.

=== Western Caribbean ===
The precursor to Bill and Hurricane Carlos in the eastern Pacific Ocean produced widespread heavy rain in Central America. In Guatemala, flooding affected more than 100 homes while a landslide in the Alta Verapaz Department killed two people. About 516,000 people were affected by the floods in that country. In Honduras, two people died near Tegucigalpa, while two other persons were missing. Heavy rains fell across parts of the Yucatán Peninsula, with accumulations peaking at 13 in (330 mm) in Cancún, the highest daily total seen in the city in nearly two years. Flooding and damage to trees and cars occurred in the Cancún. One person in the city died from electrocution.

=== Texas ===
Visualization of rainfall over Texas on June 17

In response to the storm, more than 250 flights were canceled in Houston. Caldwell County, Texas banned non-essential travel between 10:30 p.m. CDT June 16 and 7:00 a.m. CDT June 17 in response to "eminent emergency conditions related to flooding and high winds". A voluntary evacuation order was issued by the Galveston County Office of Emergency Management for people living on the Bolivar Peninsula. The United States Coast Guard closed waterways from Matagorda Bay to Galveston Bay as the storm approached, prohibiting the use of small crafts. Ferry services were suspended due to rising tide levels. Boat owners in Port Lavaca secured their boats to their docks. Early on June 17, Sealy's local police department warned locals to stay indoors due in response to heavy rain expected later in the day. A tornado watch was also issued by the Storm Prediction Center; the storm would spawn four tornadoes in the state. As the cyclone made landfall, both Palacios and Port O'Connor recorded peak wind gusts to 53 mph (85 km/h), while the storm tide rose to 3 ft (0.9 m) above normal in Port Lavaca. Heavy rainfall accompanied Bill, with accumulations peaking at 11.77 in (298.96 mm) west of Ganado.

In Matagorda County a number of roads were closed in the Sargent area due to flooding. Water approached, but did not damage homes in the city of Matagorda. In Brazoria County, storm surge caused minor coastal flooding at San Luis Pass Park, Surfside Beach, and Treasure Island. Inland, precipitation led to overflowing of Chocolate and Halls bayous. Similarly, minor coastal flooding and erosion also occurred in Galveston County along the Bolivar Peninsula and on Galveston Island. In the towns on the western side of the island, waves deposited sand and other debris onto the streets. Two parking garages were damaged and two roads were closed due to coastal flooding at Jamaica Beach. In Harris County, minor storm surge and freshwater flooding was reported in Shoreacres, with the Taylor Bayou exceeding its banks. A number of low-lying roads in Chambers County also experienced light storm surge inundation.

On June 16, Highway 87 was closed from Gilchrist to Highway 124 due to debris. Port Lavaca, the water level was reported to be 3 ft (0.91 m) above normal early in the day. In Sealy, power outages occurred and water rescues were necessitated as a result of flooding. Rising water levels near Indianola forced the closure of several roads, preventing residents from returning. Throughout Calhoun County, the local fire department performed several water rescues. A child drowned in Nolanville after being swept into a culvert.

=== Oklahoma ===
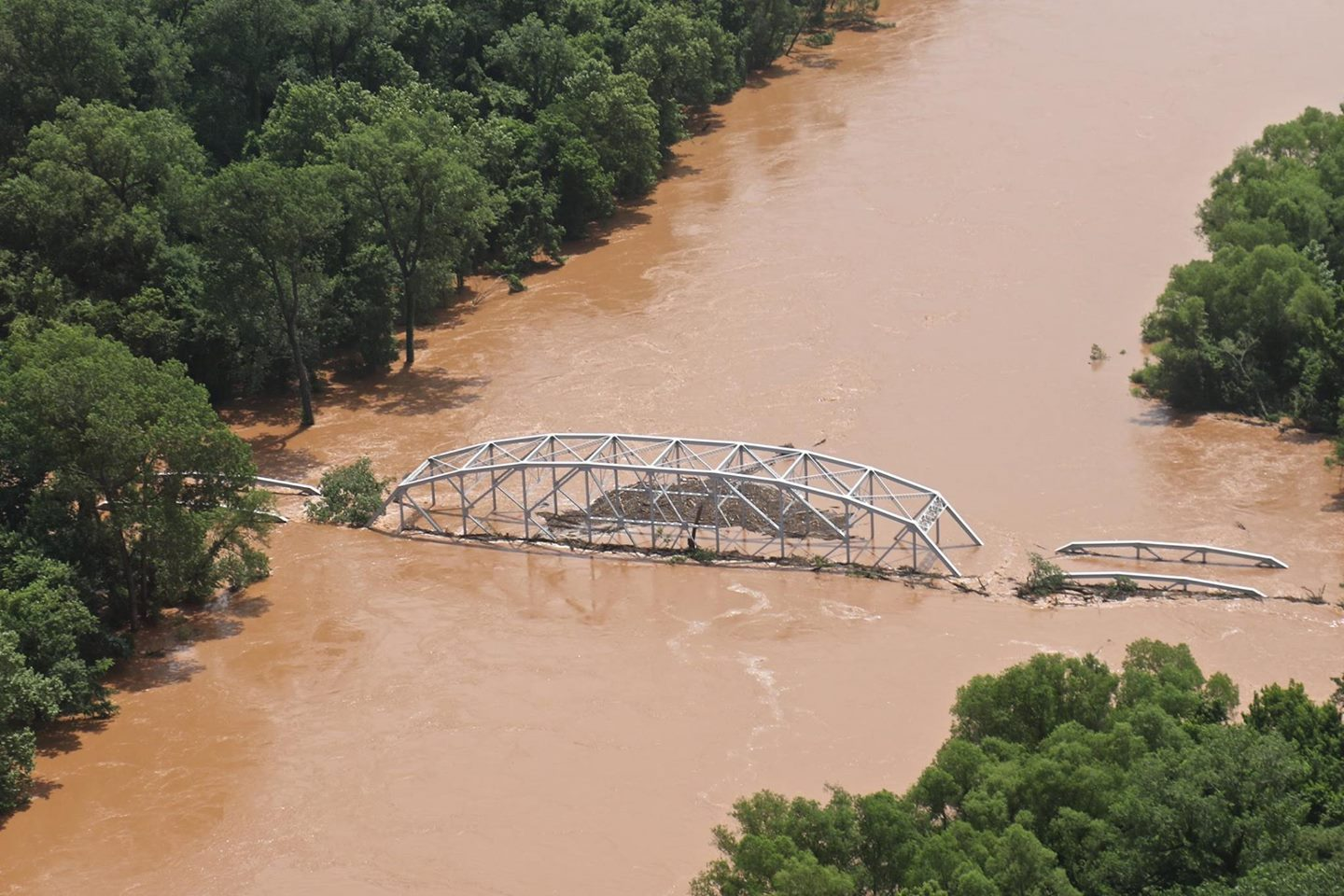
A bridge along Highway 377 over-topped by the flooding Washita River near Tishomingo, Oklahoma

After between 4 and 8 inches (100 and 200 mm) of rain fell in Carter County, the local National Weather Service office issued a flash flood emergency for the area. Interstate 35 was shut down after a rockslide in the Arbuckle Mountains resulted in boulders blocking the roadway near Turner Falls. A two-year-old boy was killed after he was swept down a river in Ardmore. An 80-year-old woman's body was recovered from a car partially-submerged in floodwaters near Macomb, but her official cause of death is as of yet undetermined.

=== Midwestern United States ===
Radar imagery of Tropical Depression Bill near the Red River on June 17

In Indiana, the remnants of Bill contributed to the rainiest June on record in portions of the state, while Fort Wayne observed its wettest month ever. Winds gusting between 50 and 60 mph (80 and 97 km/h) in North Central Indiana downed many trees, which damaged some houses in the state. Precipitation rates of 2 to 3 in (51 to 76 mm) per hour inundated fields and roads throughout the area. Near Troy, the remnants of Bill spawned an EF-0 tornado, which damaged trees in an area of approximately 0.33 mi (0.53 km) in length and about 140 yd (130 m) in width.

Heavy rain from the remnants of Tropical Storm Bill affected Ohio on June 20. Portions of southwestern Ohio, already suffering from the effects of protracted rain over the past several days and damage from an intense storm that caused downed trees, power outages and road closures due to heavy water, remained under a flood warning as rain continued to fall. Over 2 in (51 mm) of precipitation fell in Athens, which inundated streets and caused water damage at a restaurant. Central Ohio also experienced flooding due to nearly 3 in (76 mm) of rain in the Columbus area. Many streets and underpass in the city were inundated, forcing firefighters and police to rescue people from their cars. Several basements, homes, and a swim club building were flooded. On one street, people clung to signs to prevent themselves from being washed away. Organizers of the Columbus Pride festival ended the event nearly seven hours early. The Scioto River, the Big Darby Creek, and the Raccoon Creek overflowed in Licking and Pickaway counties. Additionally, residents of Logan County were evacuated as the Great Miami River and Indian Lake swelled. After the storm, a state of emergency was declared in the county and the Red Cross distributed flood cleanup kits. A tornado spawned in Bartlett knocked down tree limbs, damaged the roof of a home, and carried a boat through the neighborhood.

=== Elsewhere ===
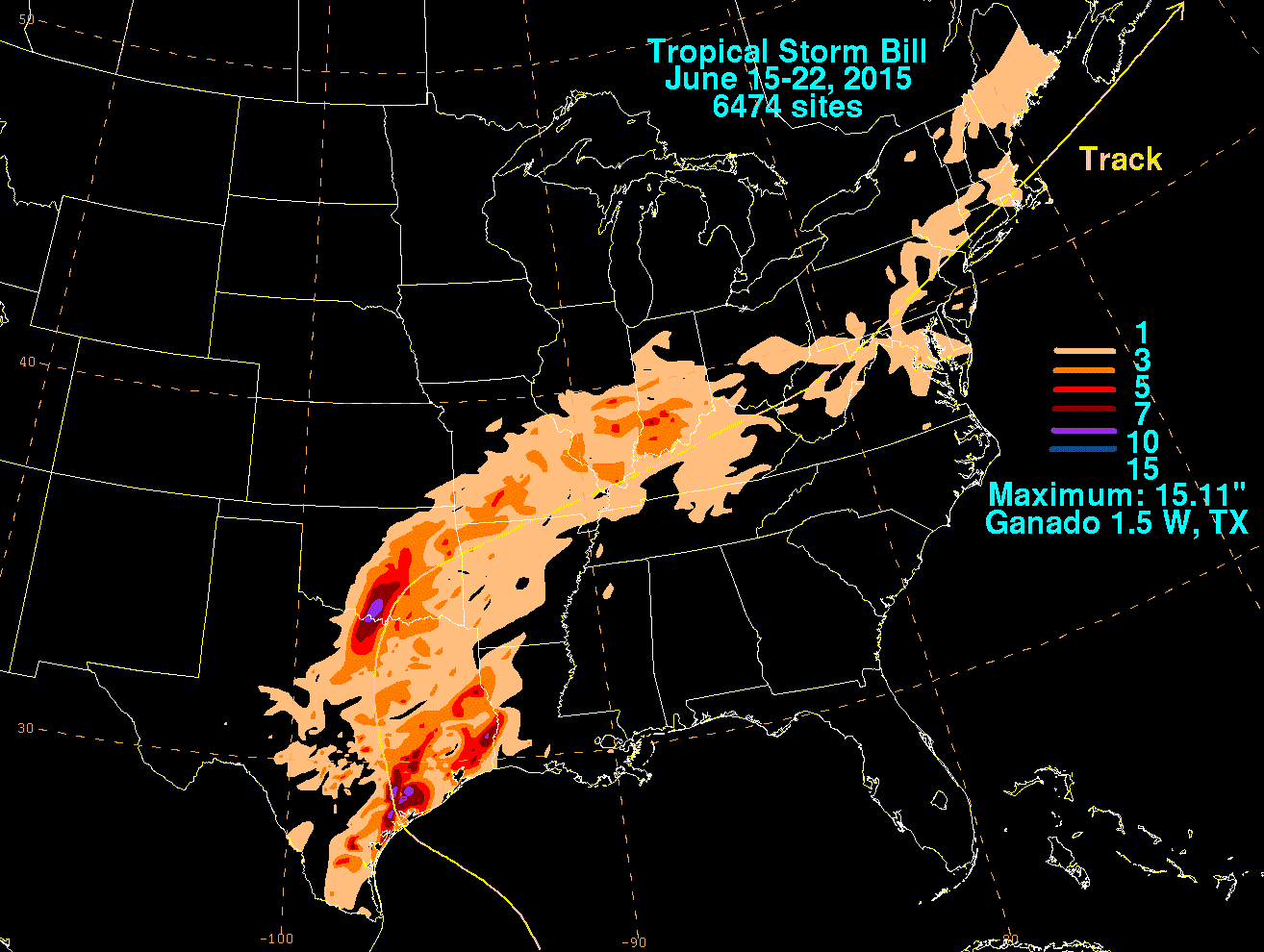
Rainfall associated with Tropical Storm Bill in the United States

The remnants of Bill dropped 2.86 in (73 mm) of rain in Henderson, Kentucky, where the 25th annual W. C. Handy Blues & Barbecue Festival was being hosted. In West Virginia, the remnants of Bill brought flash flooding and downed trees, one of which fell on a car in Marion County. A few vehicular accidents also occurred due to slick roads. In Virginia, an EF0 tornado spawned near Bowling Green downed several trees and damaged a mobile home. Winds mainly knocked down power lines, trees, and branches in eastern Virginia, resulting in numerous road closures and damaging a shed in Sussex and several cars in Powhatan and Richmond. In Washington, D.C., the White House recorded 1.95 in (50 mm) of rain from the storm, while Reagan Washington National Airport set a record for June 20, 2.37 in (60 mm) of rain.

The storm dropped nearly 2 in (51 mm) of precipitation in York County, Pennsylvania. A very small mudslide collapsed a few walls of a home in York. The Yellow Breeches Creek near Camp Hill crested at 10.3 ft (3.1 m), which is more than 7 ft (2.1 m) above flood stage. In Maryland, a tornado touched-down in Tuscarora, but caused no damage. Although a weak system, winds from the remnants of Bill toppled utility poles, power lines, trees, and tree limbs throughout the state. About 50,000 people were left without electricity, which included around one-third of customers in Charles County. Rainfall led to flooding in low-lying areas, with 1 ft (0.30 m) of water left on roads in Point of Rocks. Fire crews in Frederick County rescued a few people and cars trapped in the floodwaters. The remnants of Bill produced precipitation in many other portions of the Mid-Atlantic and New England regions. In Rhode Island, the storm dropped 1 to 2 in (25 to 51 mm) of rainfall, inundating intersections and low-lying areas. In the United Kingdom, the remnants of Bill caused flash flooding in North East England.

== See also ==
- Other storms of the same name
- 2015 Texas–Oklahoma flood and tornado outbreak
- Tropicals Storm Allison
- Tropical Storm Hermine (2010)
- Tropical Storm Erin (2007)
- Tropical Storm Dean (1995)
- Tropical Storm Cindy (2017)
- Tropical Storm Imelda (2019)
- Tropical Storm Beta (2020)
