= Claudio =

- Pronunciation: Italian: [ˈklaudjo] Spanish: [ˈklawðjo] European Portuguese: [ˈklawðju]
- Gender: Male
- Language: Italian, Spanish, Portuguese,

Other names
- Related names: Claudia, Claude, Claudi

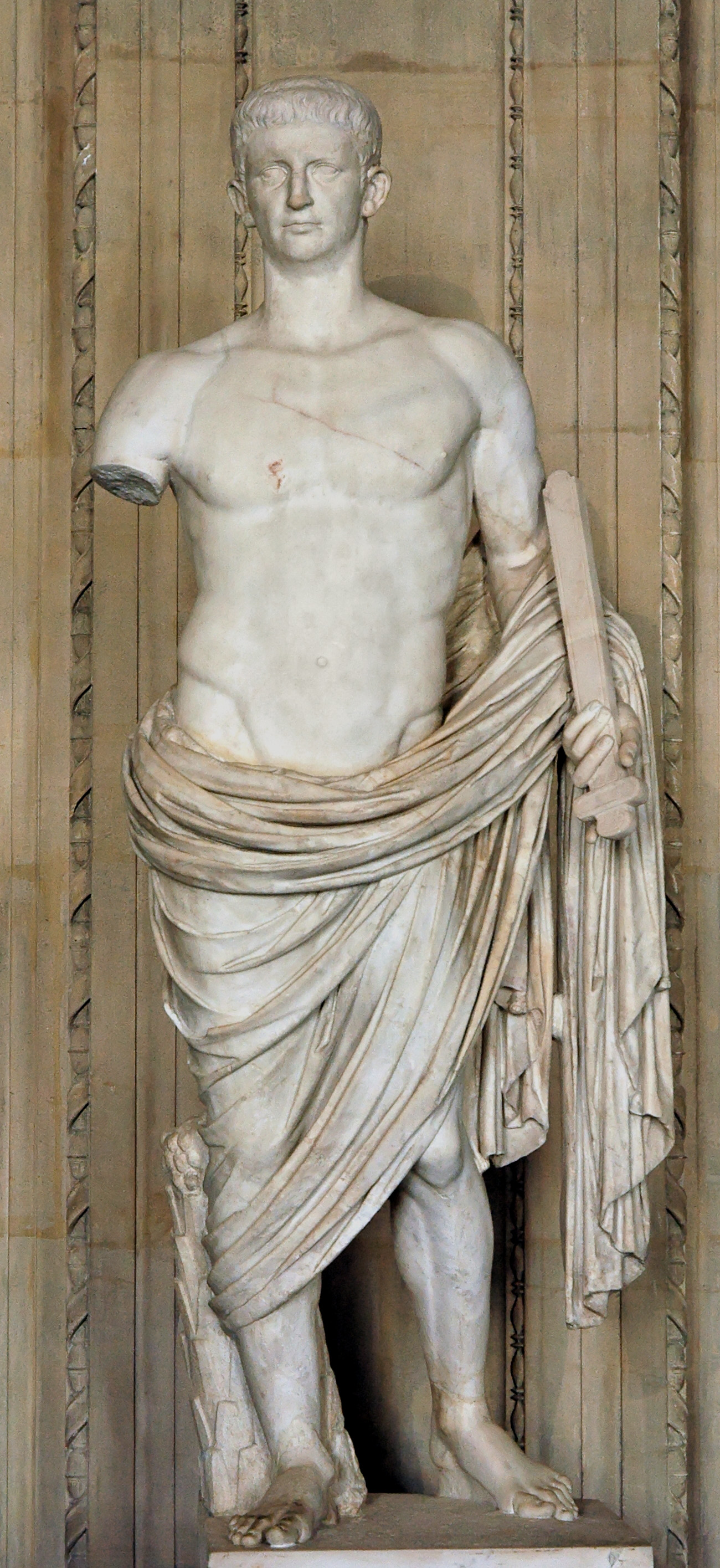
Emperor Claudius (reigned 41–54)

Claudio is an Italian and Spanish first name. In Portuguese, it is accented Cláudio. In Catalan and Occitan, it is Claudi, while in Romanian it is Claudiu.

== Origin and history ==
Claudius was the name of an eminent Roman gens, the most important members of which were:

- Claudius, Emperor Tiberius Claudius Caesar Augustus Germanicus
- Appius Claudius Sabinus Regillensis (fl. 486 BC), founder of the family, originally a Sabine known as Attius Clausus.
- Appius Claudius Crassus (fl. 450 BC), public official, decemvir in 451 BC, appointed to codify the laws
- Appius Claudius Caecus (fl. 300 BC), official orator, consul in 307 BC and 296 BC, known for the Appian Way
- Claudius Gothicus (210–270), officer in the Roman army and a provincial governor

== First name: Claudio ==
Claudio became a popular first name due to the spread of Christianity during the Middle Ages. Claudio is also used in Spanish and in Portuguese, accented as Cláudio. Notable people with the name include:

- Claudio Abarca (born 1994), Chilean footballer
- Claudio Abbado (1933–2014), Italian conductor
- Claudio Achillini (1574–1640), Italian Baroque poet
- Claudio Acosta (born 1988), Argentine footballer
- Claudio Acquaviva (1543–1615), Italian Jesuit
- Claudio Agnisetta (born 1943), Italian sprint canoer
- Claudio Albizuris (born 1981), Guatemalan footballer
- Claudio Alcívar (born 1966), Ecuadorian footballer
- Claudio Alvarado (born 1960), Chilean business manager and politician
- Claudio Ambrosini (born 1948), Italian composer and conductor
- Claudio Ambu (born 1958), Italian footballer
- Claudio Amendola (born 1963), Italian actor, TV presenter and director
- Claudio Antonioli (born 1962), Italian fashion entrepreneur
- Claudio Apollonio (1921–2008), Italian ice hockey player
- Claudio Aprile (born 1969), Uruguayan-Canadian chef
- Claudio Aquino (born 1991), Argentine football winger or midfielder
- Claudio Aranzadi (born 1946), Spanish engineer, businessman and politician
- Claudio Arbiza (born 1967), Uruguayan footballer
- Claudio Argento (born 1943), Italian film producer and screenwriter
- Claudio Arrau (1903–1991), Chilean-born pianist
- Claudio Arredondo (born 1962), Chilean actor and politician
- Claudio Arturi (born 1971), Uruguayan footballer
- Claudio Arzeno (born 1970), Argentinean retired footballer
- Claudio Azzolini (1940–2025), Italian politician
- Claudio Baccalà (1923–2007), Swiss painter
- Claudio Báez (1947–2017), Mexican actor
- Claudio Baeza (born 1993), Chilean footballer
- Claudio Baglioni (born 1951), Italian musical artist
- Claudio Baiocchi (1940–2020), Italian mathematician
- Claudio Barigozzi (1909–1996), Italian biologist and geneticist
- Claudio Barragán (born 1964), Spanish footballer
- Claudio Barrientos (1935–1982), Chilean boxer
- Claudio Barroso Gomes (1952–2025), Brazilian metalworker, trade unionist, and politician
- Claudio Basso (born 1977), Argentine singer
- Claudio Francesco Beaumont (1694–1766), Italian painter
- Claudio Beauvue (born 1988), French professional footballer from Guadeloupe
- Claudio Bellini (born 1963), Italian architect and designer
- Claudio Bellucci (born 1975), Italian former association footballer
- Claudio Benetti (born 1971), Argentine footballer
- Claudio Beorchia (born 1932), Italian politician
- Claudio Bermúdez (born 1971), Mexican musical artist
- Claudio Besio (born 1970), Swiss footballer
- Claudio Biaggio (born 1967), Argentine footballer and manager
- Claudio Bieler (born 1984), Argentine footballer
- Claudio Biern Boyd (1940–2022), Spanish animator who founded the Spanish animation company BRB Internacional
- Claudio Bigagli (born 1955), Italian actor
- Claudio Bincaz (1897–1980), Argentine sportsman
- Claudio Bisio (born 1957), Italian actor and comedian
- Claudio Bisogniero (born 1954), Italian diplomat
- Claudio Böckli (born 1984), Swiss biathlete
- Claudio Bonadio (1956–2020), Argentine judge
- Claudio Bonanni (born 1997), Italian footballer
- Claudio Bonivento (born 1950), Italian film producer, director and screenwriter
- Claudio Bonoldi (1783–1846), Italian tenor
- Claudio Borghese, Roman Catholic prelate
- Claudio Borghi (born 1964), Argentine football manager and former player
- Claudio Borghi (born 1970), Italian politician
- Claudio Borri, Italian engineer, academic and writer
- Claudio Bortolotto (born 1952), Italian cyclist
- Claudio Bosia (born 1983), Italian freestyle skier
- Claudio Botosso (born 1958), Italian actor
- Claudio Bravo (1936–2011), Chilean painter
- Claudio Bravo (born 1983), Chilean footballer
- Claudio Bravo, (born 1997), Argentine footballer
- Claudio Brindis de Salas (1800–1872), Cuban musician
- Claudio Brindis de Salas Garrido (1852–1911), Cuban violinist
- Claudio Brizi, Italian organist and harpsichordist
- Claudio Brook (1927–1995), Mexican actor
- Claudio Bunster (born 1947), Chilean theoretical physicist
- Claudio Burlando (born 1954), Italian politician
- Claudio Cabán (born 1963), Puerto Rican long-distance runner
- Claudio Cabrera (born 1963), Argentine footballer
- Claudio Cafiero (born 1989), Italian footballer
- Claudio Calasans (born 1983), Brazilian Jiu-Jitsu practitioner
- Claudio Calderón (born 1986), Chilean footballer
- Claudio Caligari (1948–2015), Italian film director and screenwriter
- Claudio Camaso (1939–1977), Italian actor
- Claudio Camin (born 1970), Italian cyclist
- Claudio Canaparo (born 1962), Argentine philosopher
- Claudio Candotti (1942–2015), Italian field hockey player
- Claudio Caniggia (born 1967), Argentine retired footballer who played as forward or winger
- Claudio Canosa (born 1963), Argentine‑Australian retired football player and coach
- Claudio Cantelli (born 1989), Brazilian racing driver
- Claudio Canti, Sammarinese footballer
- Claudio Capelli (born 1986), Swiss artistic gymnast
- Claudio Capéo (born 1985), French singer of Italian descent
- Claudio Capone (1952–2008), Italian voice actor
- Claudio Capponi (born 1959), Italian composer
- Claudio Cardozo (born 1983), Uruguayan footballer
- Claudio Carosino (1951–2010), Italian physician
- Claudio Casacci, Italian space scientist and amateur astronomer
- Claudio Casanova (1895–1916), Italian footballer
- Claudio José Casas (born 1982), Spanish cyclist
- Claudio Casciolini (1697–1760), Italian composer
- Claudio Cassano (born 2003), Italian footballer
- Claudio Cassinelli (1938–1985), Italian actor
- Claudio Castagnoli (born 1980), Swiss-born professional wrestler also known as Cesaro
- Claudio Castellini (born 1966), Italian comic book artist
- Claudio Castelucho (1870–1927), Spanish painter
- Claudio Castiglioni, Italian lightweight rower
- Claudio Castilla Ruiz (born 1983), Spanish dressage rider
- Claudio Castravelli, Canadian motion picture producer
- Cláudio Castro (born 1979), Brazilian lawyer and politician
- Claudio Castro (born 1983), Chilean politician
- Claudio Cavalieri (1954–1977), Italian footballer
- Claudio Cavazza (1934–2011), Italian businessman
- Claudio Cecchetto (born 1952), Italian record producer and talent scout
- Claudio Celon (born 1961), Italian Olympic sailor
- Claudio Celso (born 1955), Brazilian musical artist
- Claudio Centurión (born 1983), Paraguayan footballer
- Claudio Cerri (born 1960), Italian cyclist
- Claudio Chavarría (born 1980), Chilean footballer
- Claudio Chena (born 1964), Argentine footballer
- Claudio Cherubini, Italian former long jumper
- Claudio Chiappucci (born 1963), retired Italian professional cyclist
- Claudio Ciborra (1951–2005), Italian academic
- Claudio Ciccia (born 1972), Uruguayan footballer
- Claudio Ciccolini, 17th-century Roman Catholic bishop
- Claudio Cipelletti, Italian film director
- Claudio Cipolla (born 1955), Italian bishop of the Catholic Church
- Claudio Circhetta (born 1970), Swiss football referee
- Claudio Cirillo, Italian cinematographer
- Claudio Coccoluto (1962–2021), Italian disc jockey
- Claudio Coello (1642–1693), Spanish painter
- Claudio Coralli (born 1983), Italian footballer
- Claudio Corioni (born 1982), Italian cyclist
- Claudio Corti (disambiguation), several people
- Claudio Corradino (born 1959), Italian politician
- Cláudio Correa (born 1993), Paraguayan footballer
- Cláudio Corrêa e Castro (1928–2005), Brazilian actor
- Claudio Corvalán (born 1989), Argentine footballer
- Claudio Costa (disambiguation), several people
- Claudio Costamagna (born 1956), Italian banker and businessman
- Claudio Costanzo (born 1985), Italian footballer
- Claudio Crocco (born 1958), Argentine footballer
- Claudio Cucinotta (born 1982), Italian cyclist
- Claudio Cuello (born 1958), Argentine volleyball player and coach
- Claudio Cupellini (born 1973), Italian film director and screenwriter
- Claudio Dadómo (born 1982), Uruguayan footballer
- Claudio Damiani, Italian poet
- Claudio De Pascalis (born 1982), Italian footballer
- Claudio De Vincenti (born 1948), Italian politician
- Claudio Del Vecchio, Italian businessman
- Claudio Delgado (born 1984), Paraguayan footballer
- Claudio Della Penna (born 1989), Italian footballer
- Claudio Descalzi (born 1955), Italian businessman
- Claudio Desderi (1943–2018), Italian baritone and conductor
- Claudio Desolati, Italian footballer
- Claudio Di Coste (born 1954), Italian volleyball player
- Claudio Di Veroli, Argentine-Italian harpsichordist
- Claudio Dias (born 1994), English footballer
- Claudio Detto (born 1950), Italian painter
- Claudio Donelli (1928–2022), Italian politician
- Claudio Donoso (died 2021), Chilean forester
- Claudio Echeverri (born 2006), Argentine footballer
- Claudio Edinger (born 1952), Brazilian photographer
- Claudio Elías (born 1974), Uruguayan footballer
- Claudio Elórtegui Raffo (born 1951), Chilean economist
- Claudio Enría (born 1973), Argentine footballer
- Claudio Ermelli (1892–1964), Italian actor
- Claudio Escauriza (born 1958), Paraguayan decathlete
- Claudio Fabi (born 1940), Italian composer
- Claudio Fäh (born 1975), Swiss film director, producer and screenwriter
- Claudio Falcão (born 1994), Brazilian footballer
- Claudio Fasoli (born 1939), Italian jazz saxophonist and composer
- Claudio Fasolo (born 1960), Italian cyclist
- Claudio Fattoretto (1956–2013), Italian voice actor
- Claudio Fava (born 1957), Italian politician
- Claudio Fermín (born 1950), Venezuelan politician
- Claudio Ferrarese (born 1978), Italian footballer
- Claudio Fiorentini (1921–2014), Italian sports shooter
- Claudio Flores (born 1976), Uruguayan footballer
- Claudio Foscarini (born 1958), Italian football coach
- Claudio Francesconi (born 1945), Italian fencer
- Claudio Francisci (born 1944), Italian racing driver
- Claudio Gilberto Froehlich (1927–2023), Brazilian zoologist and academic
- Claudio Galán Pachón, Colombian politician
- Claudio Galli (born 1965), Italian volleyball player
- Claudio García (born 1963), former Argentinian international footballer
- Claudio Garella (1955–2022), Italian footballer
- Claudio Gaudiosi (born 1953), Italian navy officer
- Claudio Gentile (born 1953), Italian football coach and former player
- Claudio Gioè (born 1975), Italian actor
- Claudio Giorgi, Italian film director and actor
- Claudio Giovannesi (born 1978), Italian film director and screenwriter
- Claudio Giráldez, Spanish footballer
- Claudio Tommaso Gnoli, Italian information scientist
- Claudio Golinelli (born 1962), Italian cyclist
- Claudio Gomes (born 2000), French association football player
- Claudio González (1976–2026), Argentine football forward
- Claudio González (born 1990), Chilean football goalkeeper
- Claudio Graf (born 1976), Argentine footballer
- Claudio S. Grafulla (1812–1880), Spanish-American composer
- Claudio Granzotto (1900–1947), Italian sculptor
- Claudio Grassi, (born 1955), Italian politician
- Claudio Grassi, (born 1985), Italian tennis player
- Claudio Graziano (born 1953), Italian general
- Claudio Grech, Maltese politician with Nationalist Party
- Claudio Gruenberg (born 2000), Peruvian footballer
- Claudio Guerra (born 1972), Uruguayan football midfielder
- Claudio Guerra (born 1983), Argentine football forward
- Claudio Gugerotti (born 1955), Italian priest
- Claudio Guglielmoni (born 1940), Italian footballer
- Claudio Guillén (1924–2007), Spanish writer and literary scholar
- Claudio Guindón, Argentine rower
- Claudio Guzmán (1927–2008), Chilean-American director
- Claudio Herrera (disambiguation), several people
- Claudio Hohmann (born 1954), Chilean politician
- Claudio Holenstein (born 1990), Swiss footballer
- Claudio Huepe (1939–2009), Chilean politician, engineer and politician
- Claudio Huepe Minoletti (born 1966), Chilean politician
- Claudio Husaín (born 1974), Argentine footballer
- Claudio Iannone, Argentinian cyclist
- Claudio Imhof (born 1990), Swiss bicycle racer
- Claudio Inella (born 1990), Uruguayan footballer
- Claudio Jara (born 1959), Costa Rican footballer
- Claudio Jopia (born 1991), Chilean footballer
- Claudio Kammerknecht (born 1999), German association footballer
- Claudio Kevo Cavallini (1952–2015), Italian sculptor
- Claudio Lafarga (born 1979), Mexican actor
- Claudio Langes (born 1961), Italian racing driver
- Claudio Latorre (born 1986), Chilean footballer
- Claudio Llanos, Chilean historian and scholar
- Claudio Lostaunau (1939–2016), Peruvian professional footballer
- Claudio Gabriele de Launay (1786–1850), Italian politician
- Claudio Ledesma (born 1983), American mixed martial artist
- Claudio Lezcano (died 1999), Paraguayan footballer
- Claudio Libotte (born 1938), Italian field hockey player
- Claudio Licciardello (born 1986), Italian sprinter
- Claudio Linati (1790–1832), Italian artist
- Claudio Lippi (born 1945), Italian TV presenter, actor and singer
- Claudio Liverziani (born 1975), Italian baseball player
- Claudio Lizama (born 1973), Chilean footballer
- Claudio Lolli (1950–2018), Italian singer-songwriter, poet and writer
- Claudio Lombardelli (born 1987), Luxembourgish footballer
- Claudio Lombardi (1942–2025), Italian Formula One engineer
- Claudio Lombardo (born 1963), Italian footballer
- Claudio López (1767-1833), pre-statehood Alcade-Mayor of Los Angeles
- Claudio López, 2nd Marquess of Comillas (1853–1925), Catalan businessman and philanthropist
- Claudio Lotito (born 1957), Italian entrepreneur
- Claudio Luchinat, Italian chemist
- Claudio Lustenberger (born 1987), Swiss footballer
- Claudio Lusuardi (born 1949), Italian motorcycle racer
- Claudio Antón de Luzuriaga, Spanish lawyer and politician
- Claudio Maccone (1948–2025), Italian astronomer
- Claudio Maffei (born 1999), Italian footballer
- Claudio Magris (born 1939), Italian writer
- Claudio Maldonado (born 1980), Chilean footballer
- Claudio Maldonado (musician) (born 1980), Argentine musical artist
- Claudio Mamerto Cuenca (1812–1852), Argentine physician and poet
- Claudio Mancini (born 1969), Italian politician
- Claudio Manela, Filipino baseball player
- Claudio Maniago (born 1959), Italian prelate of the Catholic Church
- Claudio Marangoni (born 1954), Argentine footballer
- Claudio Marchisio (born 1986), Italian footballer
- Claudio Marenzi (born 1962), Italian entrepreneur
- Claudio Marescotti (1520–1590), 16th-century Roman Catholic bishop
- Claudio Marrero (born 1989), Dominican Republic boxer
- Claudio Martelli (born 1943), Italian former politician and journalist
- Claudio Martínez, Chilean footballer and actor
- Claudio Martínez Mehner (born 1970), Spanish piano soloist and pedagogue
- Claudio Martini (born 1951), Italian politician
- Claudio Martino, Argentine stage and film director
- Cláudio Marzo (1940–2015), Brazilian film and television actor
- Claudio Marzocco (born 1959), Italian engineer and businessman
- Claudio Maselli (born 1950), Italian footballer and manager
- Claudio Matteini (1923–2003), Italian footballer
- Claudio Mattone (born 1943), Italian composer, lyricist and publisher
- Claudio Medina (born 1993), Spanish footballer
- Claudio Mele (born 1968), Argentine footballer
- Claudio Mendes (born 2000), Bissau-Guinean footballer
- Claudio Meneses (born 1988), Chilean footballer
- Claudio Merlo (born 1946), Italian footballer and coach
- Claudio Merulo (1533–1604), Italian composer and organist
- Claudio Mezzadri (born 1965), Swiss tennis player
- Claudio Michelotto (1942–2025), Italian cyclist
- Claudio Milar (1974–2009), Uruguayan footballer
- Claudio Miranda, Chilean-born American cinematographer
- Claudio Moneta (born 1967), Italian voice actor
- Claudio Monteverdi (1567–1643), Italian composer
- Claudio Morandini (born 1960), Italian writer
- Claudio Morel (born 1978), Paraguayan footballer
- Claudio Morganti (born 1973), Italian politician
- Claudio Moroni (born 1959), Argentine lawyer and politician
- Claudio Morra (born 1995), Italian footballer
- Claudio Morresi (born 1962), Argentine footballer
- Claudio Mosca (born 1991), Argentine footballer
- Claudio Muccioli (born 1958), Sammarinese politician
- Claudio Muñoz (born 1981), Chilean footballer
- Claudio Muñoz (born 1984), Chilean footballer
- Claudio Naranjo (1932–2019), Chilean psychotherapist
- Claudio Nasco (1976–2013), Cuban journalist and newscaster
- Claudio Nieto Jiménez (born 1977), Chilean ski mountaineer and triathlete
- Claudio Nizzi (born 1938), Italian comic author
- Claudio Noce (born 1975), Italian film director
- Claudio Nolano (born 1975), Italian taekwondo practitioner
- Claudio Nunes (born 1968), Italian professional bridge player
- Claudio Núñez (born 1975), Chilean footballer
- Claudio Obregón (1935–2010), Mexican actor
- Claudio O'Connor (born 1963), Argentine musical artist
- Claudio de Oliveira (born 2008), Guatemalan footballer
- Cláudio de Oliveira, Brazilian cartoonist
- Claudio Orrego (born 1966), Chilean politician
- Claudio Ortiz (born 1981), Argentine association football player
- Claudio Osorio (born 1958), Venezuelan entrepreneur and businessman
- Claudio Osorio (born 2002), East Timorese footballer
- Claudio Otermín (born 1961), Argentine footballer
- Claudio Oyarzo (born 1979), Swedish musical artist
- Claudio Padoan (born 1948), Italian rower
- Claudio Pafundi (born 1962), Argentine archer
- Claudio Palma (born 1969), Chilean play-by-play commentator
- Claudio Panatta (born 1960), Italian professional tennis player
- Claudio Pani (born 1986), Italian footballer
- Claudio Pari, Italian composer
- Claudio Paris (born 1971), Argentine footballer
- Claudio Parra (born 1945), Chilean musician and pianist
- Claudio Passarelli (born 1965), German wrestler
- Claudio Patrignani (born 1959), Italian middle-distance runner
- Claudio Pätz (born 1987), Swiss curler
- Claudio Pavone (1920–2016), Italian historian and archivist
- Claudio Pelissero (born 1968), Italian musical artist
- Claudio Pelosi (born 1966), Italian football player
- Claudio Roberto Perdomo (born 1964), Honduran politician
- Claudio Pérez (born 1985), Argentine footballer
- Claudio Pérez (cyclist) (born 1957), Venezuelan cyclist
- Claudio Pescia (born 1963), Swiss curler
- Claudio Petruccioli (born 1941), Italian politician and journalist
- Claudio Pieri (1940–2018), Italian football referee
- Claudio Pistolesi (born 1967), Italian tennis player
- Claudio Pizarro (born 1978), Peruvian footballer
- Claudio E.A. Pizzi, Italian logician and epistemologist
- Claudio von Planta (born 1962), Swiss cinematographer
- Claudio Plit (born 1954), Argentine swimmer
- Claudio Polledri (born 1936), Swiss fencer
- Claudio Pollio (born 1958), Italian wrestler
- Claudio Polsinelli (born 1952), Canadian politician
- Claudio Pombo (born 1994), Argentine footballer
- Claudio Prieto (1934–2015), Spanish composer
- Claudio Procesi (born 1941), Italian mathematician
- Claudio Pronetto (born 1980), Argentine footballer
- Claudio Puelles (born 1996), Peruvian mixed martial arts fighter
- Claudio Raja Gabaglia Lins, Brazilian diplomat
- Claudio Ramiadamanana (born 1988), Malagasy footballer
- Claudio Randrianantoanina (born 1987), Malagasy footballer
- Claudio Rangoni (died 1619), Italian Roman Catholic bishop
- Claudio Rangoni (1559-1621), Italian Roman Catholic bishop
- Claudio Ranieri (born 1951), Italian football manager and player
- Claudio Repetto, Italian footballer
- Claudio Reyna (born 1973), American soccer player
- Claudio Riaño (born 1988), Argentine footballer
- Claudio Ribeiro, Brazilian conductor
- Claudio Ridolfi (1560–1644), Italian painter
- Claudio Rinaldi (disambiguation), several people
- Claudio Risi (1948–2020), Italian film director
- Claudio Rissi (1956–2024), Argentine actor and stage director
- Claudio Rivadero (born 1970), Argentine footballer
- Claudio Rivalta (born 1978), Italian footballer
- Claudio Rivero (born 1985), Uruguayan footballer
- Claudio Roberto, Brazilian football manager
- Claudio Roca (born 1994), Mexican actor
- Claudio Rocchi (1951–2013), Italian composer
- Claudio Roditi (1946–2020), Brazilian jazz trumpeter
- Claudio Rodríguez (disambiguation), several people
- Claudio Rodríguez Cataldo (born 1954), Chilean politician
- Claudio Rodríguez Fer (born 1956), Spanish writer
- Claudio Damian Rodriguez Santorum, Argentine-born lawyer
- Claudio Rojas (born 1973), Guatemalan footballer
- Claudio Romero (born 2000), Chilean discus thrower
- Claudio Sala (born 1947), Italian footballer
- Claudio Salinas (born 1976), Chilean footballer
- Claudio Salto (born 1995), Argentine footballer
- Claudio Sanchez (born 1978), lead singer and guitarist; of Coheed and Cambria
- Claudio Sánchez-Albornoz (1893–1984), Spanish scholar
- Claudio Santamaria (born 1974), Italian actor
- Claudio Santini (born 1992), Italian footballer
- Claudio Santis (born 1992), Chilean footballer
- Claudio Saracini (1586–1630), Italian composer
- Claudio Sartori (1913–1994), Italian musicologist and bibliographer
- Claudio Saunt, American historian
- Claudio Scajola (born 1948), Italian politician
- Claudio Scarchilli (1924–1992), Italian film actor
- Claudio Scarzanella (born 1986), Italian footballer
- Claudio Schiavoni (born 1960), Italian racing driver
- Claudio Scimone (1934–2018), Italian conductor
- Claudio Sclosa (born 1961), Italian footballer
- Claudio Scremin (born 1968), Canadian ice hockey player
- Claudio Segovia (1933–2025), Argentinian stage artist
- Claudio Sepúlveda (born 1992), Chilean footballer
- Claudio Servetti (born 1994), Uruguayan footballer
- Claudio Signorile (born 1937), Italian politician
- Cláudio Silva (born 1982), Brazilian mixed martial artist
- Claudio Silva, Brazilian-American computer scientist
- Claudio Silveira Silva (1939–2007), Uruguayan sculptor
- Cláudio Silva, Portuguese footballer
- Claudio Silvestrin (born 1954), Italian architect and designer
- Claudio Simonetti (born 1952), Italian composer
- Claudio Slon (1943–2002), Brazilian musician
- Claudio Solone (born 1953), Italian long-distance runner
- Claudio Sorrentino (1945–2021), Italian actor
- Claudio de Sousa (born 1985), Italian footballer
- Claudio Sparacello (born 1995), Italian footballer
- Claudio Spies (1925–2020), American composer
- Claudio Spinelli (born 1997), Argentine footballer
- Claudio Spontón (born 1968), Argentine footballer
- Claudio Sprecher (born 1980), Liechtenstein alpine skier
- Claudio Stecchi (born 1991), Italian pole vaulter
- Claudio Stefanazzi (born 1970), Italian politician
- Claudio Daniel Stern (born 1954), Uruguayan biologist
- Claudio Strunz (born 1966), Argentine thrash metal drummer
- Claudio Suárez (born 1968), Mexican footballer
- Claudio Sulser (born 1955), Swiss footballer
- Claudio Taddei (1966–2019), Uruguayan-Swiss singer-songwriter and painter
- Claudio Tapia (born 1967), Argentine football executive
- Claudio Tedeschi (born 1955), Swiss footballer
- Claudio Teehankee (1918–1989), Philippine Chief Justice
- Claudio Tello (1963–2014), Chilean footballer
- Claudio Terzi (born 1984), Italian footballer
- Claudio Tiribelli (born 1946), Italian hepatologist
- Claudio Tognolli (1963–2024), Brazilian journalist, musician and writer
- Claudio Tolomei (1492–1556), Italian philologist
- Claudio de la Torre (1895–1973), Spanish novelist
- Claudio de la Torre (born 1980}, Venezuelan model and actor
- Claudio Torrejón (born 1993), American soccer player
- Claudio Torelli (born 1954), Italian cyclist
- Claudio Torres (born 2003), Chilean footballer
- Claudio Tozzi, Brazilian artist
- Claudio Trezzani (1881–1955), Italian general during World War II
- Claudio Trionfi (born 1942), Italian film and television director
- Claudio Úbeda (born 1969), Argentine footballer
- Claudio Vacca (1915–1985), Argentine footballer
- Claudio Valenzuela (born 1969), Chilean musical artist
- Claudio Valigi (born 1962), Italian association football manager
- Claudio Vandelli (born 1961), Italian cyclist
- Claudio Vargas (disambiguation), several people
- Claudio Veggio (1510–1543), Italian composer
- Claudio Vekstein (born 1965), Argentine architect
- Claudio Velásquez (born 1986), Argentine footballer
- Claudio Velluti (1939–2024), Italian basketball player
- Claudio Vena, Italian composer
- Claudio Ventura (1953–2021), Italian cinematic artist and editor
- Claudio Verino (born 1984), Argentine footballer
- Claudio Vicuña Subercaseaux, Chilean agriculturist and politician
- Claudio Vidal, Argentine politician
- Claudio Videla (born 1982), Chilean footballer
- Claudio Vieira de Oliveira, Brazilian accountant, author and orator
- Claudio Villa (1926–1987), Italian singer and actor
- Claudio Villa (comics) (born 1959), Italian comics artist
- Claudio Villalba (born 1982), Argentine footballer
- Claudio Villan (born 1973), Chilean footballer
- Claudio Villanueva (born 1988), Ecuadorian racewalker
- Claudio Vinazzani (born 1954), Italian footballer
- Claudio Vita-Finzi (born 1936), Australian-British academic
- Claudio Vitalone (1936–2008), Italian judge and politician
- Claudio Vivas (born 1968), Argentinian football manager
- Claudio Wernli (born 1942), Chilean alpine skier
- Claudio Willer (1940–2023), Brazilian writer and poet
- Claudio Yacob (born 1987), Argentine footballer
- Claudio Yafuso (born 1970), Argentine judoka
- Claudio Zamorano (born 1998), Chilean footballer
- Claudio Zanier (born 1942), Italian historian
- Claudio Zappa (born 1997), Italian footballer
- Claudio Zei, Italian swimmer
- Claudio Zin (born 1945), Italian-Argentine journalist and politician
- Claudio Zulianello (born 1965), Argentine volleyball player
- Claudio Zupo (1984–2020), Mexican judoka

=== In fiction ===
- Claudio, in William Shakespeare's play Much Ado About Nothing
- Claudio, in William Shakespeare's play Measure for Measure
- Claudio Kilgannon, in The Amory Wars series of science fiction comic books and novels
- Claudio Serafino, in the Tekken video game series

== First name: Cláudio ==
Cláudio is the Portuguese name derived from Claudius. Notable people with the name include:

=== Mononymic footballers ===
- Cláudio César de Aguiar Mauriz (1940–1979), commonly known as Cláudio, Brazilian footballer
- Cláudio Christovam de Pinho (1922–2000), commonly known as Cláudio, Brazilian footballer
- Cláudio Mendes Prates (born 1965), commonly known as Cláudio, Brazilian footballer
- Luiz Cláudio Barros (born 1978), commonly known as Luiz Cláudio, Brazilian footballer
- Cláudio Roberto Siqueira Fernandes (born 1980), commonly known as Cláudio, Brazilian footballer
- Luís Cláudio Carvalho da Silva (born 1987), commonly known as Cláudio, Brazilian footballer

=== Given name ===
- Cláudio Taffarel (born 1966), Brazilian footballer
- Cláudio Adão (born 1955), Brazilian footballer
- Caçapa, Brazilian footballer Cláudio Roberto da Silva (born 1978)
- Lito (Cape Verdean footballer), Cape Verdean footballer Cláudio Zélito Fonseca Fernandes Aguiar (born 1975)

== See also ==
- Claudinho (disambiguation)
- Publius Claudius Pulcher (disambiguation)
