= Matteini =

Matteini is an Italian surname. Notable people with the surname include:

- Claudio Matteini (1923–2003), Italian footballer
- Davide Matteini (born 1982), Italian footballer
- Michele Alberto Matteini, art historian
- Teodoro Matteini (1753–1831), Italian painter
