= Claudio de Oliveira (disambiguation) =

Claudio de Oliveira may refer to:

- Claudio de Oliveira (born 2008), a Guatemalan footballer who plays as a winger for Xelajú
- Cláudio de Oliveira, a Brazilian political cartoonist
- Claudio de Oliveira (ichthyologist), a Brazilian ichthyologist
