= Claudinho =

Claudinho, a diminutive form of the given name Claudio, may also refer to:

- Claudinho (footballer, born 1967), born Cláudio Batista dos Santos, Brazilian football forward
- Claudinho (footballer, born 1977), born Cláudio Rogério Almeida Cogo, Brazilian football left-back
- Claudinho (footballer, born 1980), born Cláudio Roberto Siqueira Fernandes Filho, Brazilian football right-back
- Claudinho (footballer, born 1981), born Claudio Luiz Jandre Sobrinho, Brazilian football midfielder
- Claudinho (footballer, born May 1982), born Cláudio André Santos Assis, Brazilian football left midfielder
- Claudinho (footballer, born November 1982), born Cláudio Wanderley Sarmento Neto, Brazilian football midfielder
- Claudinho (footballer, born 1990), born Cláudio de Souza, Brazilian football defender for Ituano
- Claudinho (footballer, born 1991), born Cláudio Pereira da Silva Júnior, Brazilian football forward for ABC
- Claudinho (footballer, born 1997), born Cláudio Luiz Rodrigues Parise Leonel, Brazilian football attacking midfielder for Al Sadd
- Claudinho (footballer, born September 2000), born Claudio Coelho Salvático, Brazilian football right-back for Criciúma
- Claudinho (footballer, born November 2000), born Cláudio Henrique Paiva Porfirio, Brazilian football forward for Cruzeiro

== See also ==
- Claudio (disambiguation)
- Claudinho & Buchecha, a Brazilian musical duo
