= Claudi =

Claudi is a masculine given name which may refer to:

- Claudi Arimany (born 1955), Spanish/Catalan flautis
- Claudi L. H. Bockting (born 1969), Dutch clinical psychologist and professor
- Claudi Lorenzale (1814–1889), Spanish painter
- Claudi Martí (born 1940), Occitan singer

== See also ==
- Claudio
