= Cláudia Silva =

Cláudia Silva may refer to:

- Cláudia da Silva, Brazilian volleyball player
- Claudia Silva (actress), Mexican actress and writer

== See also ==
- Claudio Silva (disambiguation)
