= Detto =

Detto may refer to:

== People ==
- Albert Detto (1845–1910), German politician
- Claudio Detto (born 1950), Italian painter
- Detto Mariano (1937–2020), Italian musician

== Other ==
- Detto, fatto., a 2012 EP

== See also ==
- Deto (disambiguation)
