= Ciccia =

Ciccia is a surname. Notable people with the surname include:

- Claudio Ciccia (born 1972), Uruguayan football player
- Matilde Ciccia (born 1952), Italian ice dancer
