= Claudio Silva =

Claudio Silva may refer to:

- Cláudio Silva (born 1982), Brazilian mixed martial artist
- Claudio Silva (computer scientist), Brazilian American computer scientist
- Claudio Silveira Silva (1939–2007), Uruguayan sculptor
- Cláudio Silva (footballer) (born 1998), Portuguese footballer
