= Claudio Rinaldi =

Claudio Rinaldi may refer to:

- Claudio Rinaldi (painter) (1852–?), Italian painter
- Claudio Rinaldi (poker player)
- Claudio Rinaldi (speed skater) (born 1987), Italian short-track speed-skater
