= Deto =

Deto may refer to:

- DETO Twenterand, a Dutch football club
- Deto (crustacean), a genus of woodlice
- Deto Station, a metro station in Osaka, Japan

== See also ==
- Detto (disambiguation)
