= Claudio Rodríguez =

Claudio Rodríguez may refer to:

- Claudio Rodríguez (actor) (1933–2019), Spanish voice actor
- Claudio Rodríguez Fer (born 1956), Spanish- and Galician-language writer
- Claudio Rodríguez (singer, born 1991), Cuban singer
- Claudio Rodríguez (poet) (1934–1999), Spanish poet
- Claudio Rodríguez (footballer, born 1960), Argentine football manager and player
- Claudio Rodríguez (footballer, born 1969), Argentine football manager and player
- Claudio Rodríguez Cataldo (born 1950), Chilean business manager and politician
