= Herno =

Italian luxury fashion brand

Herno S.p.A.
- Company type: Società per azioni
- Industry: Fashion
- Founded: 1948; 78 years ago in Lesa, Piedmont
- Founder: Giuseppe Marenzi, Alessandra Diana
- Website: www.herno.com

Herno is an Italian luxury fashion brand specialized in outerwear.

Herno was established in 1948 in Lesa, Piedmont, by Giuseppe Marenzi and his wife Alessandra Diana. The company takes its name from the Erno River, which flows into Lake Maggiore. Initially focusing on raincoats, the brand developed waterproof outerwear inspired by the local climate. Early production made use of cotton fabrics treated with castor oil, originally sourced from abandoned military aircraft materials left after the Second World War.

== History ==
During the economic expansion of the 1950s, Herno diversified into handwoven cashmere coats and womenswear collections. By the late 1960s, the company pursued international growth, opening stores in Osaka and Tokyo in 1968, followed by an expansion into the North American market in the 1980s. In this period, Herno mainly produced outerwear on behalf of other luxury houses, including Gucci, Prada, Louis Vuitton, and Burberry.

From the 1980s onwards, Herno consolidated its reputation with parkas and down jackets, produced using lightweight nylon, ultrasonic stitching, and natural down filling. The company emphasized strict sourcing policies, drawing down exclusively from Siberia and the Lomellina region in Italy, while prohibiting the live-plucking of birds.

In 2007, leadership passed to Claudio Marenzi, son of the founders. Under his direction, Herno introduced sustainability initiatives, including the renovation of the Lesa headquarters to operate with energy self-sufficiency through photovoltaic systems.

Since 2020, Herno has expanded its portfolio to include knitwear, offering sweaters, cardigans, and vests, often incorporating down elements. The company has also developed collections of accessories and lifestyle products, further diversifying beyond its original focus on outerwear. In 2025, they launched the Habita line which features home accessories.
