= Michele Alberto Matteini =

Michele A. Matteini is an art historian, a specialist of Luo Ping and a scholar of late imperial China (17th-19th centuries). A graduate from the Institute of Fine Arts of the New York University, Mattini is an author and co-curator of the show Eccentric Visions: The Worlds of Luo Ping, sponsored by Zurich's Museum Rietberg, Switzerland, which traveled to the Metropolitan Museum of Art, New York City. The New York Times called the catalogue 'superb.' He lives in New York City and teaches at New York University, where he is Associate Professor of East Asian Art, Architecture and Visual Culture.

He earned his PhD in Chinese Art History at the Institute of Fine Arts of New York University,

Before joining the NYU faculty Matteini taught at Reed College and Oberlin College.

In 2013-2014 he was The Andrew W. Mellon Foundation member at the Institute for Advanced Study at Princeton.

== Books ==
The Ghost in the City: Luo Ping and the Craft of Painting in Eighteenth-Century China. University of Washington Press, 2023.

Eccentric visions : the worlds of Luo Ping, edited by Kim Karlsson, Alfreda Murck, and Michele Matteini. Zürich : Museum Reitberg Zürich, 2009.
