= Claudio Marenzi =

Italian entrepreneur

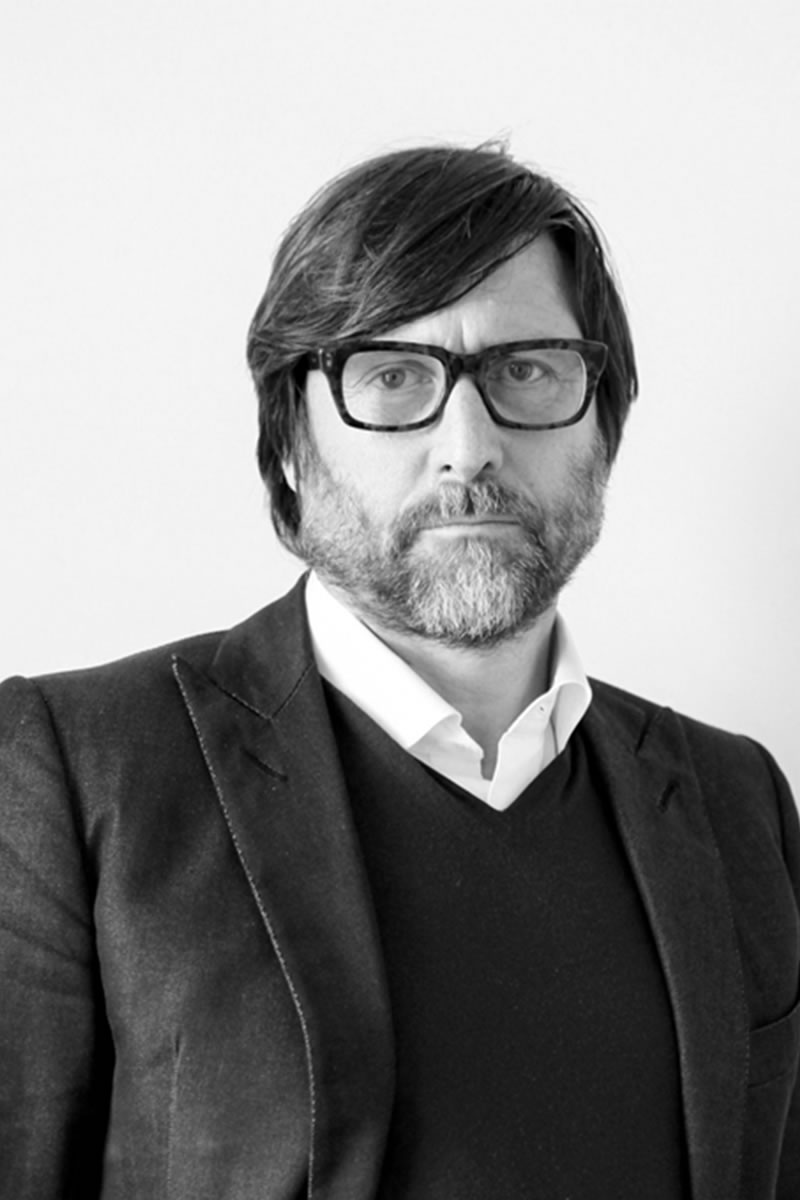
- Born: February 10, 1962 (age 64); Arona
- Occupation: Entrepreneur

Claudio Marenzi (born February 10, 1962, in Arona) is an Italian entrepreneur, currently serving as President of Herno Spa and President and CEO of Montura Spa.

== Biography ==
Claudio is the third son of Giuseppe Marenzi, founder of Herno Spa in 1948 along with his wife Alessandra Diana. He began working in the family business at a young age, holding positions in various departments, such as Operations Director and Commercial Director for the foreign market, focusing particularly on the Japanese market, where Herno has been present since 1968. In 2007, he was appointed CEO of Herno Spa, and in 2011, he also assumed the role of President. Since then, he has worked to expand the brand's international presence.

Marenzi has always emphasized the importance of the connection with the local area, particularly with Lesa and the Piedmont shore of Lake Maggiore, while maintaining creative and production control and valuing functionality as well as aesthetics in Herno's products. Under his leadership, Herno has seen steady growth, recording a turnover of 153 million in 2022.

From 2013 to 2018, he served as President of Sistema Moda Italia. He was also President of Pitti Immagine from 2017 to 2023. Moreover, from March 2017 to July 2020, he was President of Confindustria Moda, an organization that has worked to promote and protect the excellence of the Italian fashion, textile, and accessory sector on global markets.

=== Acquisition of Montura ===
In 2021, he acquired 55% of Montura, thus becoming president and CEO of the company.

== Awards ==
In 2016, the President of the Italian Republic Sergio Mattarella conferred upon Claudio Marenzi the honor of Cavaliere del Lavoro.

Two years later, in 2018, he received the Leonardo "Quality Italy" Award.
