= Claudio Plit =

Argentine swimmer

Personal information
- Nationality: Argentina
- Born: November 7, 1954 (age 71) Rosario, Argentina

Sport
- Sport: Swimming
- Strokes: Free style
- Club: Club Atlético Fisherton

Claudio Plit (born November 7, 1954) is an Argentine swimmer who won four world titles in professional open water swimming and was inducted as an honoree in the International Swimming Hall of Fame in Fort Lauderdale, USA, in 2014.

== Early life ==
Claudio Plit was born in the city of Rosario, Santa Fe, in 1954. He was the youngest of two brothers. After his father´s sudden death, when Claudio was only 6 years old, swimming took an important role in his life, promoted by his mother. She sent him and his brother to practice swimming at the "Atletico Fisherton" Club, a sports club in the Fisherton neighbor in Rosario, where Claudio learnt to swim and then started to participate in local competitions.

At age 12, Claudio, who was used to swimming in the pool, decided to participate in his first open water swimming competition in the Paraná River in the city of Rosario, Santa Fe, in which he arrived in the second place in his age group. After this start, he came back to compete in the same race when he was 15 years old, but this time he conquered the first place in the general competition, an achievement that he repeated for three years in a row.

In 1973, as the winner of the Argentine Open Water Championships he was supposed to travel to Italy as an amateur swimmer to compete in Europe, but a delay in the confirmation of his travel from the local organization, made him change his plans. Disappointed by not being able to travel to Italy, he was invited then by a friend to compete professionally in the Lac Saint-Jean in Canada. Since he did not have any money for the plane ticket, his friend helped him to obtain a bank credit to be able to fly to Canada. This travel turned out to be a turning point in his life. With 18 years old, he raced for the first time in the cold waters of Lac Saint-Jean and arrived in the third place in his inaugural international professional competition, an achievement that would be the beginning of his professional career.

== Career ==
He began swimming in the Paraná river when he was a boy and later started his professional career competing in national and international races that concluded in a three-decade career taking part in more than 250 marathon swims throughout North and South America, Europe, Africa, and Asia.

After having won the national championships of open water swimming in his country, he was five times the winner of the marathon swimming race Traversée Internationale du Lac Saint-Jean in Quebec, Canada (1981-1985-1986-1987-1988). Until 1997, he completed 25 swims in the Traversée Internationale du Lac Saint-Jean and was declared Honorary Citizen in this Canadian city.

He won the 63-kilometer marathon swimming race Santa Fe-Coronda Marathon four times in a row in 1974, 1975, 1976 and 1977. Other milestones of his career included the establishment of a new Latin-American record in the crossing of the English Channel and a new record in a 23-hour swim uniting the cities of Santa Fe and Rosario in Argentina.

He was the President of the Federation of Professional Swimmers (1980-82 y 1990). He received a Konex Award for his achievements in swimming in 1990.

Known for his endurance in cold waters, he now coaches open water swimmers in the crossing of the English Channel and travels worldwide giving lectures and coaching swimmers in marathon swimming competitions.
