= Claudio Villalba =

Argentine footballer

Personal information
- Full name: Claudio Emmanuel Villalba
- Date of birth: 22 August 1982 (age 44)
- Place of birth: Buenos Aires, Argentina
- Height: 1.92 m (6 ft 4 in)
- Position: Defender

Senior career*
Years	Team	Apps	(Gls)
2004–2005	Textil Mandiyú	16	(1)
2005–2006	Candelaria	17	(1)
2009–2010	Temperley	5	(0)
2010–2013	Deportivo Armenio	37	(1)
2013–2014	Comunicaciones	14	(0)
2014	Justo José de Urquiza	9	(1)
2015	Juventud Unida Universitario	9	(0)
2016	Cañuelas	4	(0)
2016	San Jorge	9	(0)
2016–2017	Tristán Suárez	17	(0)
2017–2019	Defensores Unidos	23	(2)
- * Club domestic league appearances and goals

Claudio Emmanuel Villalba (born 22 August 1982) is an Argentine professional footballer who plays as a defender.

== Career ==
Between 2004 and 2006, Villalba played for Textil Mandiyú of Torneo Argentino B and Candelaria of Torneo Argentino A and made a total of thirty-three appearances and scored two goals. In 2009, Villalba began featuring for Primera B Metropolitana side Temperley. Having featured in five matches, the defender left to join fellow third tier team Deportivo Armenio. He remained for three campaigns, culminating with seventeen games in 2012–13 as they placed eighth. After another spell in Primera B Metropolitana with Comunicaciones, Villalba had stints with Justo José de Urquiza and Juventud Unida Universitario.

Villalba spent time with Cañuelas and San Jorge in early 2016, prior to agreeing terms with Tristán Suárez later that year on 30 June. He made his debut for them on 7 September versus Deportivo Español, on the way to seventeen appearances in the 2016–17 Primera B Metropolitana. August 2017 saw Villalba move to Primera C Metropolitana with Defensores Unidos. They won the league title - and subsequent promotion - in his first season. He left in June 2019.

== Career statistics ==
As of 6 July 2020.

Appearances and goals by club, season and competition
Club	Season	League			Cup		League Cup		Continental		Other		Total	
Club	Season	Division	Apps	Goals	Apps	Goals	Apps	Goals	Apps	Goals	Apps	Goals	Apps	Goals
Textil Mandiyú	2004–05	Torneo Argentino B	16	1	0	0	—		—		0	0	16	1
Candelaria	2005–06	Torneo Argentino A	17	1	0	0	—		—		0	0	17	1
Temperley	2009–10	Primera B Metropolitana	5	0	0	0	—		—		0	0	5	0
Deportivo Armenio	2012–13	Primera B Metropolitana	17	0	2	0	—		—		0	0	19	0
Comunicaciones	2013–14	Primera B Metropolitana	14	0	0	0	—		—		0	0	14	0
Justo José de Urquiza	2014	Primera C Metropolitana	9	1	0	0	—		—		0	0	9	1
Juventud Unida Universitario	2015	Torneo Federal A	9	0	0	0	—		—		0	0	9	0
Cañuelas	2016	Primera C Metropolitana	4	0	0	0	—		—		0	0	4	0
San Jorge	2016	Torneo Federal B	9	0	0	0	—		—		0	0	9	0
Tristán Suárez	2016–17	Primera B Metropolitana	17	0	0	0	—		—		0	0	17	0
Defensores Unidos	2017–18	Primera C Metropolitana	19	2	0	0	—		—		0	0	19	2
Defensores Unidos	2018–19	Primera B Metropolitana	4	0	0	0	—		—		0	0	4	0
Defensores Unidos	Total		23	2	0	0	—		—		0	0	23	2
Career total			140	5	2	0	—		—		0	0	142	5

== Honours ==
Defensores Unidos

- Primera C Metropolitana: 2017–18
