= Claudio Delgado =

Paraguayan footballer (born 1984)

Personal information
- Full name: Claudio Ramón Delgado
- Date of birth: 21 June 1984 (age 42)
- Place of birth: San Lorenzo, Paraguay
- Height: 1.78 m (5 ft 10 in)
- Position: Forward

Senior career*
| Years | Team | Apps | (Gls) |
| 2006–2007 | Santiago Morning | 21 | (5) |
| 2008 | Cobreloa | 29 | (3) |
| 2009 | Deportes Concepción | 19 | (3) |
| 2010 | Cerro de Franco | | |
| 2011 | Sportivo Carapeguá | | |
| 2012 | 2 de Mayo | | |
| 2013 | Cerro de Franco | 18 | (1) |
| 2013 | Deportivo Santaní | | |
| 2014 | Sportivo Carapeguá | | |
| 2019 | Sportivo Obrero | – | (–) |
- * Club domestic league appearances and goals

Claudio Ramón Delgado (born 21 June 1984) is a Paraguayan former footballer who played as a forward.

== Career ==
Abroad, Delgado played for Santiago Morning and Deportes Concepción in the Primera B de Chile.

In the Chilean Primera División, he played for Cobreloa in 2009.

In his homeland, he played for Cerro Porteño PF in the top division, in addition to Sportivo Carapeguá, 2 de Mayo, Deportivo Santaní and Sportivo Obrero.
