= Claudio E. A. Pizzi =

Italian logician and epistemologist

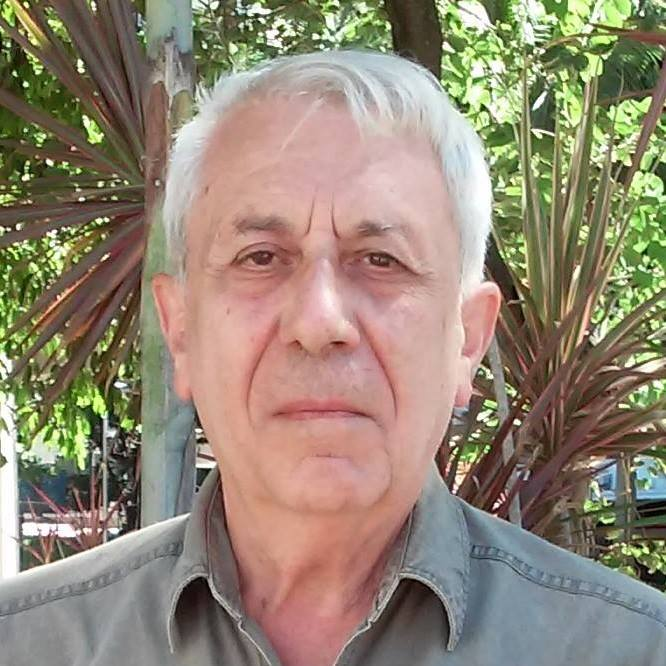
- Born: 20 September 1944 (age 81); Milan, Italy
- Education: Universita degli Studi di Milano
- Occupations: logician, epistemologist
- Known for: contributions to modal logic concerning the problem of defining necessity in terms of contingency and the use of Aristotelian squares and cubes in visualizing the relations between modal notions
- Notable work: edited An Introduction to Modal Logic

Claudio E. A. Pizzi (born 20 September 1944, Milan) is an Italian logician and epistemologist.

== Biography ==
Pizzi completed his Master's degree in philosophy from the Universita' degli studi di Milano in 1969. From 1976, he taught logic for three years at the University of Calabria. He then worked as a professor of logic and of philosophy of science at the University of Siena from 1979 to 2014, during which he became a full professor in 1997. Beginning in 1992, he worked for several Brazilian universities and especially for Centro de Logica, Epistemologia e Historia da Ciencia (CLE) of the University of Campinas. From 2008–2012, he taught logic of proof at the Faculty of Law of the Universita' di Milano-Bicocca.

== Research activities ==
After completing his studies, Pizzi edited the Italian translation of G. E. Hughes and M. J. Cresswell's An Introduction to Modal Logic and published two anthologies in 1974 and 1979, aiming to spread the knowledge of two areas of the intensional logic unknown in Italy: tense logic and conditional logic. In a number of academic papers, he developed a variant of so-called connexive logic named "logic of consequential implication", which turns out to be translatable in the main system of propositional modal logic and so decidable via the tableaux method.

Pizzi is also known for his contributions to modal logic concerning the problem of defining necessity in terms of contingency and the use of Aristotelian squares and cubes in visualizing the relations between modal notions. In collaboration with Brazilian logicians, Pizzi has explored the subject of multimodal logics (i.e. of logics whose language has more than one modal primitive), about which he produced a monograph.

His work in the field of epistemology has been mainly concerned with the counterfactual theory of causation, to which he devoted a book (1997) and a wide number of papers. He also published a book that is a collection of essays about abduction and the logic of legal proof (2009). His last book (2017) contains a methodological analysis of the investigations into a plane crash that took place in 1980, known as the "Ustica massacre".

== Works ==
- Pizzi, Claudio E. A., ed. (1974). La logica del tempo. Torino: Boringhieri.
- Pizzi, Claudio E. A., ed. (1979). Leggi di natura, modalità, ipotesi. Milano: Feltrinelli.
- Pizzi, Claudio E. A. (1997). Eventi e Cause. Una prospettiva ondizionalista. Milano: Giuffrè.
- Pizzi, Claudio E. A.; Carnielli, W. (2008). Modalities and Multimodalities. New York: Springer.
- Pizzi, Claudio E. A. (2009). Diritto, Abduzione e prova. Milano: Giuffrè.
- Pizzi, Claudio E. A. (2017). Ripensare Ustica. Createspace (Amazon).

== See also ==
- Counterfactual conditional
- Causality
