= Claudio Rinaldi (painter) =

Italian painter

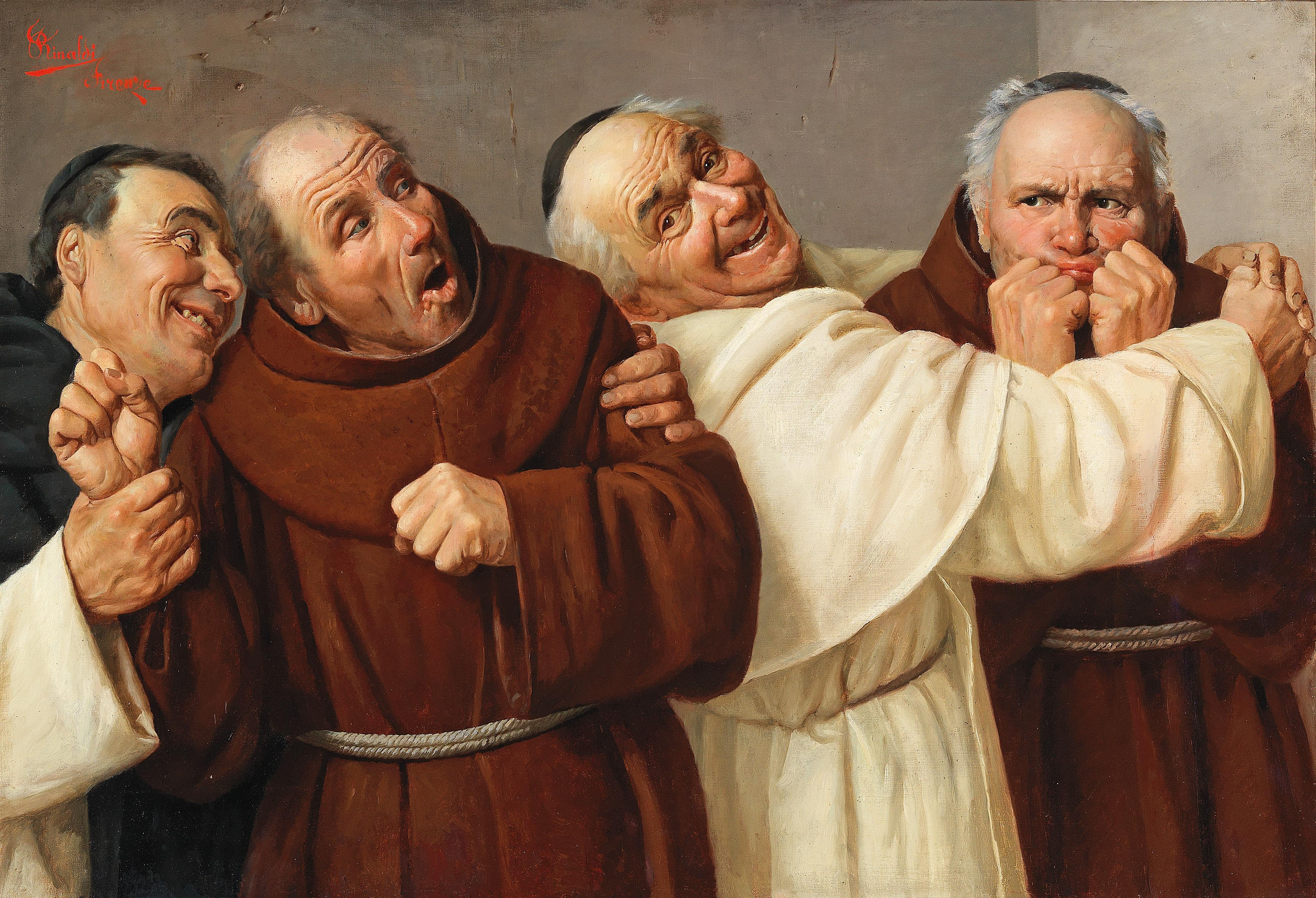
Four Monks by Claudio Rinaldi

Claudio Rinaldi (1852 – after 1909) was an Italian painter, mainly of genre subjects.

== Biography ==
He was born in Urbania and settled in Florence. During 1874–1875, he was awarded a scholarship by the Institute of Fine Arts of Urbino to study at the Academy of Fine Arts of Florence. In 1884 at Turin, he exhibited La pappa of the nonna and La stanchezza. The same year at the Promotrice of Florence, All' ombra; Carola reggimi e Una vecchia che si scalda. Other works of Rinaldi are: a vecchia usuraia; L'amico dei gatti; La stanchezza vìnce la fame; La zittelìona; Il regalo del nonno; L'innocenza; and La mamma laboriosa. One of the painters he mentored was Filippo Marfori Savini.
