= Claudio Gaudiosi =

Italian Navy officer (born 1953)

- Born: 10 April 1953 (age 73); Naples, Italy
- Military career
- Allegiance: Italy
- Branch: Italian Navy
- Rank: Vice Admiral
- Commands: Deputy Chief of Staff of the Italian Navy; ITS Giuseppe Garibaldi; ITS Grecale
- Awards: Commander of the Order of Merit of the Italian Republic

Vice Admiral Claudio Gaudiosi is an Italian Navy officer, currently serving as deputy chief of staff of the Italian Navy.

He served as commanding officer of the aircraft carrier ITS Giuseppe Garibaldi from 1998 to 1999. On January 1, 2002, he was promoted to rear admiral (lower half) and on July 1, 2006, was promoted to rear admiral (upper half). He served as commander of the Italian Front Line Naval Forces and commander of Italian Maritime Forces (COMITMARFOR) from February 2009 to October 2010. In March 2011 he was appointed deputy commander of the Italian Joint Operations Headquarters and from March 31 to November 10 was appointed Operations Commander EUFOR Libya during the 2011 military intervention in Libya.

He served as head of personnel from July 2012 to January 2013 before being appointed Deputy Chief of Naval Staff on January 22, 2013. He was promoted to vice admiral on 1 July 2013.
