= Claudio González (Argentine footballer) =

Argentine footballer (1976–2026)

Claudio Daniel González (12 September 1976 – 25 February 2026) was an Argentine professional footballer who played as a forward for clubs in Argentina and Chile. He died on 25 February 2026, at the age of 49.

== Career ==
- Estudiantes de La Plata 1995–1996
- Patronato de Paraná 1996–1999
- Huracán de Tres Arroyos 1999–2000
- Patronato de Paraná 2000–2001
- Independiente 2001–2002
- Talleres de Córdoba 2002–2003
- Rosario Central 2004
- Cobreloa 2005
- Talleres de Córdoba 2006
- General Paz Juniors 2007
