= Claudio Tozzi =

Brazilian artist

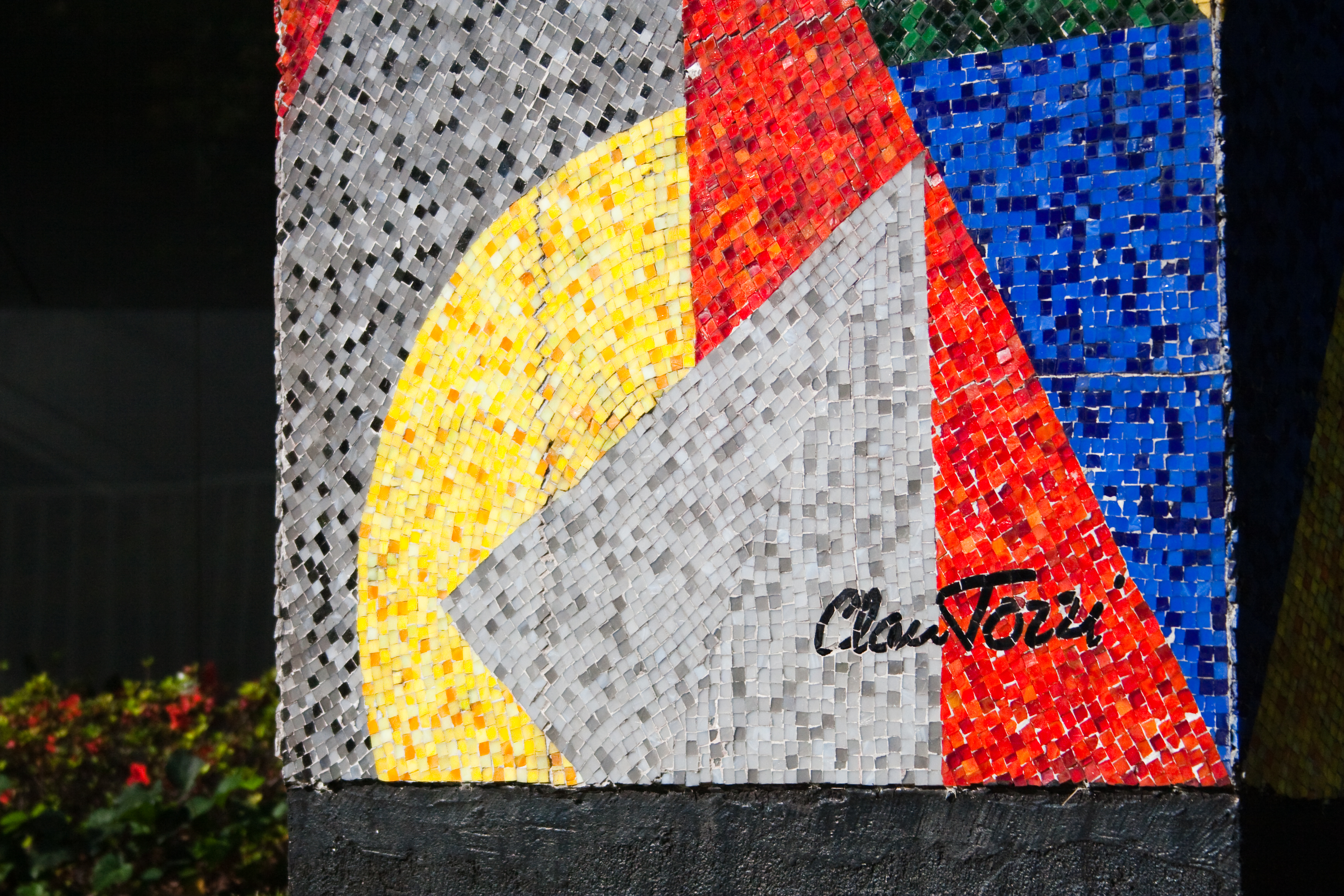
Mural and totem in the Spazio 2222 Building, Claudio Tozzi

Claudio Tozzi is a Brazilian artist born in 1944 in São Paulo, Brazil, who has worked since the 1960s to challenge the political and social culture of Brazil and the world. Through his art he has highlighted the censorship of military dictatorships, the woes of mass media, and the strength of individuals. He participated in the NeoFiguration movement, primarily about to issues experienced by Brazilians. Brazil lived under an oppressive dictatorship for years and the NeoFiguration movement worked to question the physical and social conditions of the era. Tozzi's work has since been shared worldwide as he has gained popularity outside Brazil due to widely understood themes.

== Biography ==
Tozzi was born in 1944 in São Paulo, Brazil where he continues to live and work. He entered the University of São Paulo's Faculty of Architecture and Urbanism when 20 years old. During his education, he met Mário Schenberg, a physicist and critic, who termed Tozzi's art NeoFiguration; and from there, his interest in figuration grew as he grappled with the political and social landscapes. Tozzi worked in an era of oppressive military dictatorship in Brazil where censorship was persistent and political protests were common.

== Training and influences ==
Tozzi attended the University of São Paulo in 1964, joining its Faculty of Architecture and Urbanism. He never worked as an architect but instead spent his time studying and becoming a graphic artist. During his time at the university, Tozzi's work was already connected to the NeoFiguration movement of Brazil, at least according to critic Mário Schenberg. Tozzi's interest in working within the movement grew as he began to meld the social and political realities he was witnessing.

Tozzi had many influences during these early years. He cites photos and newspaper articles from his daily life as influential in his art. The media he was influenced by were created in a time of mass public unrest and dictatorial censorship. Later, he said that the demonstrations, arrests, and repression of the people in Brazil greatly influenced his work. He also credits the access to publications, books, and magazines through the Faculty of Architecture and Urbanism of the University of São Paulo with his knowledge of the NeoFiguration movement around the world. This allowed him to see what other artists were doing and influenced the media he used.

== Career ==
Throughout his career, Tozzi worked within the NeoFiguration movement utilizing Pop Art to critique the military dictatorship in which he was living. Brazil was under direct control of the military after a coup in 1964; between 1964 and 1985 the military implemented an authoritarian regime to monitor and control the social and political lives of Brazilians. As political protests became more prevalent in the 1960s, Tozzi used more imagery that referenced crowds or political icons, with the common theme of people in protest. As he worked to mirror the society around him, his art began to show intensely contrasted images where he cut out pieces of photographs and reassembled them. This, some critics believe, was meant to show the disintegration and new integration of the image, therefore reflecting the disintegration of, or the loss of strength and unity within, Brazil.

=== NeoFiguration movement ===
Claudio Tozzi participated in the NeoFiguration (Nueva Figuración) movement, which characterized art making throughout Latin America in the 1960s, aiming to revive figurative art following a period dominated by abstract art. Many argue that the move back to figuration occurred during a time of intense political and social unrest in both Europe and the Americas. It has been hypothesized that the incorporation of figures in the NeoFiguration movement was meant to be expressive works that are essentially based on the human form. The movement has been deemed by critics one of the most important in Latin America after the war.

=== Pop Art ===
Tozzi was even more influenced by Pop Art, another international movement of the 1960s. Some of the NeoFiguration artists in Latin America, like Tozzi along with Felipe Ehrenberg and Rubens Gerchman, gravitated to Pop Art instead of the expressionistic and painterly styles. According to some art critics, Pop Art is a reflection and critique of capitalist consumerism and mass communication circuits in society. It is typically a bright, flashy, and colorful representation; but many, including Tozzi, worked to turn it into a critique of the society around them.

== Artwork and ideas ==
Tozzi's work participates primarily in the Pop Art mode, in which colorful representational figures depict and critique the surrounding political culture. Shape, color, and dimension are all carefully used to create his deeper meaning. His specific style portrays a distinct contrast of color capturing the sharpness of the political state of his country. Lastly, his stylistic use of colors also provides a dramatic difference allowing the simple images and figures he uses to become more prominent.

Much of what Tozzi depicts reflects the turbulent political status of Brazil during the period of the authoritarian regime between 1964 and 1985. Crowds, political icons, and protests are some of his recurrent themes. One of his most famous pieces is titled Multitude 1968. He uses black and white acrylic paint to depict a crowd of somewhat indistinct people, with a band of clenched fists on the top and bottom. In an interview he notes that the series of crowds he shows throughout his work are based on photos he had taken, while the historical iconography of the fist he found through his research. The raised fist icon is a symbol of unity and solidarity with oppressed peoples, historically associated with Black pride and Black power.

In another painting, Guevara, with alkyd (synthetic polyester resin) paint on eucatex (high density wood fiber board), he depicts Che Guevara, a major figure in the Cuban revolution. The painting was completed shortly after Guevara's assassination by the CIA, and his figure became a symbol of rebellion to the capitalist exploitation of Latin America by the United States. The figure of Guevara again shows Tozzi's dedication to his political beliefs and themes of political and social mobilization in Brazil.

== Exhibitions ==
- 2015, “The World Goes Pop”, Take Modern, September 17, 2015 – January 24, 2016
- 2015 “International Pop”, Walker Art Center, the Dallas Museum of Art, and the Philadelphia Museum of Art. April 11-August 29, 2015
- 2016, “New Figuration The Rise of Pop Art, 1967–1971” Almeida & Dale Gallery with the British Gallery, January 23 – March 24, 2016
- 2017, “Terre Haute Highland: Pop Art Collective Exhibition”, Galeria Jarouche, July 4 – September 9, 2017
- 2017, “Territorios”, Gary Nader Art Centre, March 2 – April 2, 2017

== Artworks ==
- A Conversa 1967 (Liquitex on canvas glued on plate 74 × 74 cm)
- Multitude 1968 (Acrylic paint on agglomerate 199 × 120 cm)
- Multidão (Crowd) 1968 (Industrial paint on duratex 77 × 130 cm)
- Catraca (Turnstile), 1968 (Wood and iron 127 × 80 cm)
- Fotonovela, 1969 (Acrylic with silkscreen ink & wood on paper glued on plate 51 × 51 cm)
- Astronauta 1969/2018 (Liquitex on canvas 70 × 70 cm)
- Mulher Bebendo 1969 (Screen printing on paper 20 × 20 in)
- Pelé 1969/1970 (Alkyd paint on eucatex 122 × 121 cm)
- Cinturão (Belt) 1970 (Liquitex on canvas 94 × 122 cm)
- USA 2012 (Screen printing on paper 17 × 35.8 in)
