= Claudio Servetti =

Uruguayan footballer (born 1994)

Personal information
- Full name: Claudio Poul Servetti Rodríguez
- Date of birth: 28 November 1994 (age 31)
- Place of birth: Montevideo, Uruguay
- Height: 1.83 m (6 ft 0 in)
- Position: Centre back

Team information
- Current team: Rangers
- Number: 27

Youth career
- 2013–2014: Miramar Misiones

Senior career*
Years	Team	Apps	(Gls)
2014–2016	Basáñez	19	(4)
2017–2021	Rampla Juniors	88	(1)
2017	→ Oriental (loan)	13	(0)
2022–2025	Deportes Recoleta	83	(11)
2025–	Rangers	14	(1)
- * Club domestic league appearances and goals as of 10 December 2025

Claudio Poul Servetti Rodríguez (born 28 November 1994) is an Uruguayan footballer who plays as a defender for Rangers de Talca in the Primera B de Chile.

== Career ==
In his homeland, Servetti played for Miramar Misiones, Basáñez, Oriental and Rampla Juniors.

In the second half of 2025, Servetti joined Rangers de Talca.

== Personal life ==
He is the older brother of the footballer Pablo Servetti.
