= Claudio Libotte =

Italian field hockey player (born 1938)

Personal information
- Nationality: Italian
- Born: 13 September 1938 (age 87) Rome, Italy

Sport
- Sport: Field hockey

Claudio Libotte (born 13 September 1938) is an Italian field hockey player. He competed in the men's tournament at the 1960 Summer Olympics.
