= Claudio Ventura =

Italian cinematic artist and editor (1953–2021)

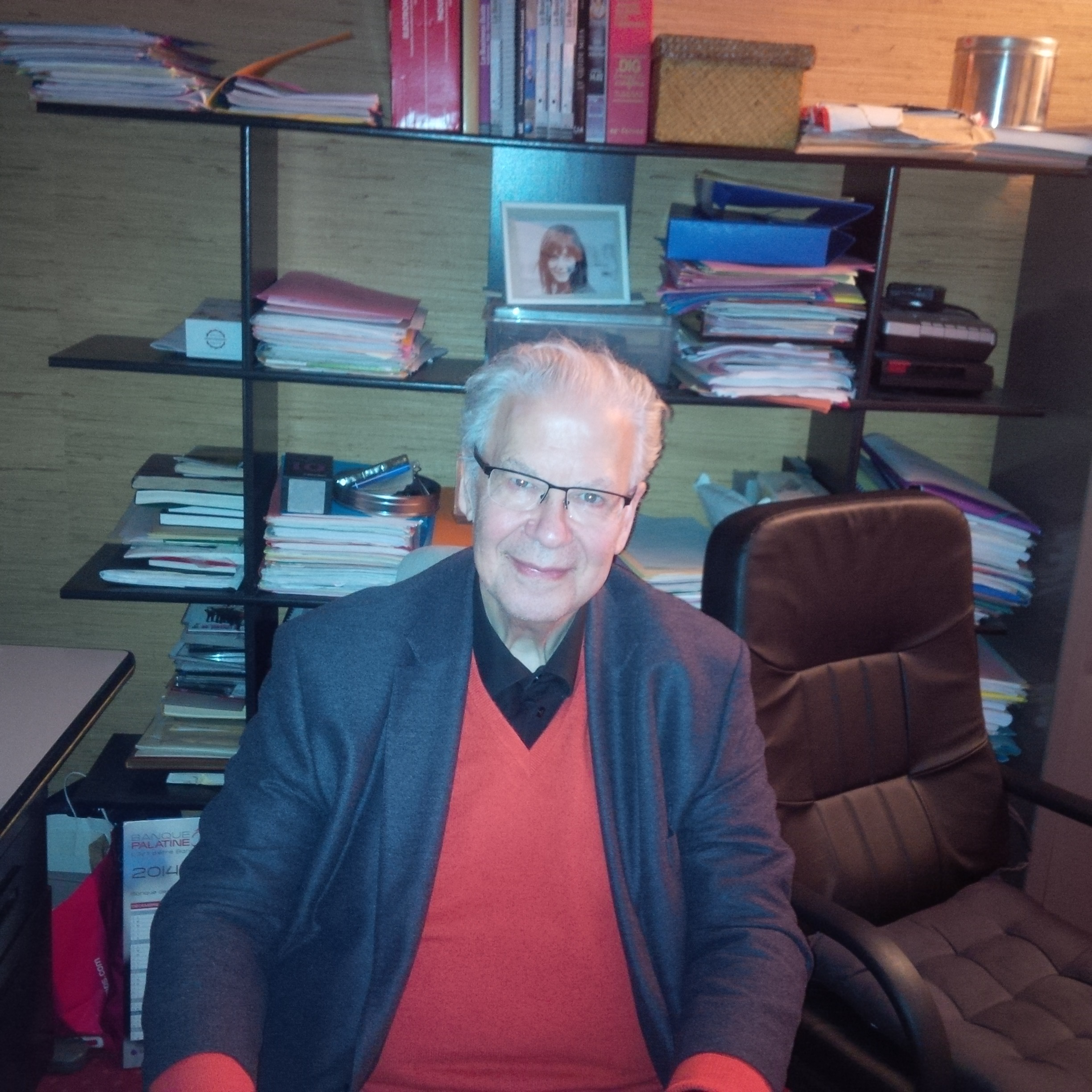
- Born: 15 August 1953
- Died: 11 August 2021 (aged 67)
- Occupations: Cinematic artist Editor

Claudio Ventura (15 August 1953 – 11 August 2021) was an Italian cinematic artist and editor. He was also Director of Karina-Films in Paris, which specialized in dubbing. He was the father of Élisabeth Ventura.

== Biography ==
After earning a degree in English, Ventura was a student of Tania Balachova and started working for 20th Century Studios. There, he collaborated on numerous films, such as The Longest Day, Let's Make Love, and others. In 1971, he founded Karina-Films. In the 1980s, he specialized in dubbing and post-synchronization.

Claudio Ventura died on 11 August 2021, at the age of 67.

== Filmography ==
- The Shameless Old Lady (1965)
- Chimes at Midnight (1965)
- Who Are You, Polly Maggoo? (1966)
- The Young Girls of Rochefort (1967)
- Mayerling (1968)
- Adieu l'ami (1968)
- Rider on the Rain (1970)
- Red Sun (1971)
- Man of La Mancha (1972)
- F for Fake (1973)
- Bloodline (1979)
- Inchon (1981)
- Docteur Jekyll et les femmes (1981)
- Just the Way You Are (1984)
