= Claudio Stefanazzi =

Italian politician (born 1970)

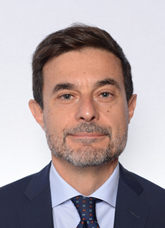
- Stefanazzi in 2022

Member of the Chamber of Deputies
- Incumbent
- Assumed office 13 October 2022
- Constituency: Apulia – P04

Personal details
- Born: 8 May 1970 (age 56)
- Party: Democratic Party

Claudio Michele Stefanazzi (born 8 May 1970) is an Italian politician serving as a member of the Chamber of Deputies since 2022. From 2015 to 2022, he served as chief of staff to Michele Emiliano.
