= Claudio Costa =

Claudio Costa may refer to:

- Claudio R. M. Costa (born 1949), general authority of The Church of Jesus Christ of Latter-day Saints
- Claudio Costa (doctor) (born 1941), Italian medical doctor, founder of the Mobile Clinic
- Claudio Costa (artist) (1942–1995), Italian artist
- Claudio Costa (parathlete) (born 1963), Italian Paralympic multi-sport athlete
