= Claudio Nasco =

Cuban journalist and newscaster

- Born: Claudio Nasco; June 17, 1976; Matanzas, Cuba
- Died: December 13, 2013 (aged 37); Santo Domingo, Dominican Republic
- Occupation(s): Journalist, newscaster
- Years active: 2000s–2013

Claudio Nasco (17 June 1976 – 13 December 2013) was a Cuban journalist and newscaster.

Born in Matanzas, Nasco began his career in the early 2000s when he became a newscaster for Cadena de Noticias (CDN), Dominican Republic.

Claudio Nasco was stabbed to death on 13 December 2013, aged 37, at a motel in Santo Domingo, Dominican Republic.
