= Claudio Luchinat =

Italian chemist

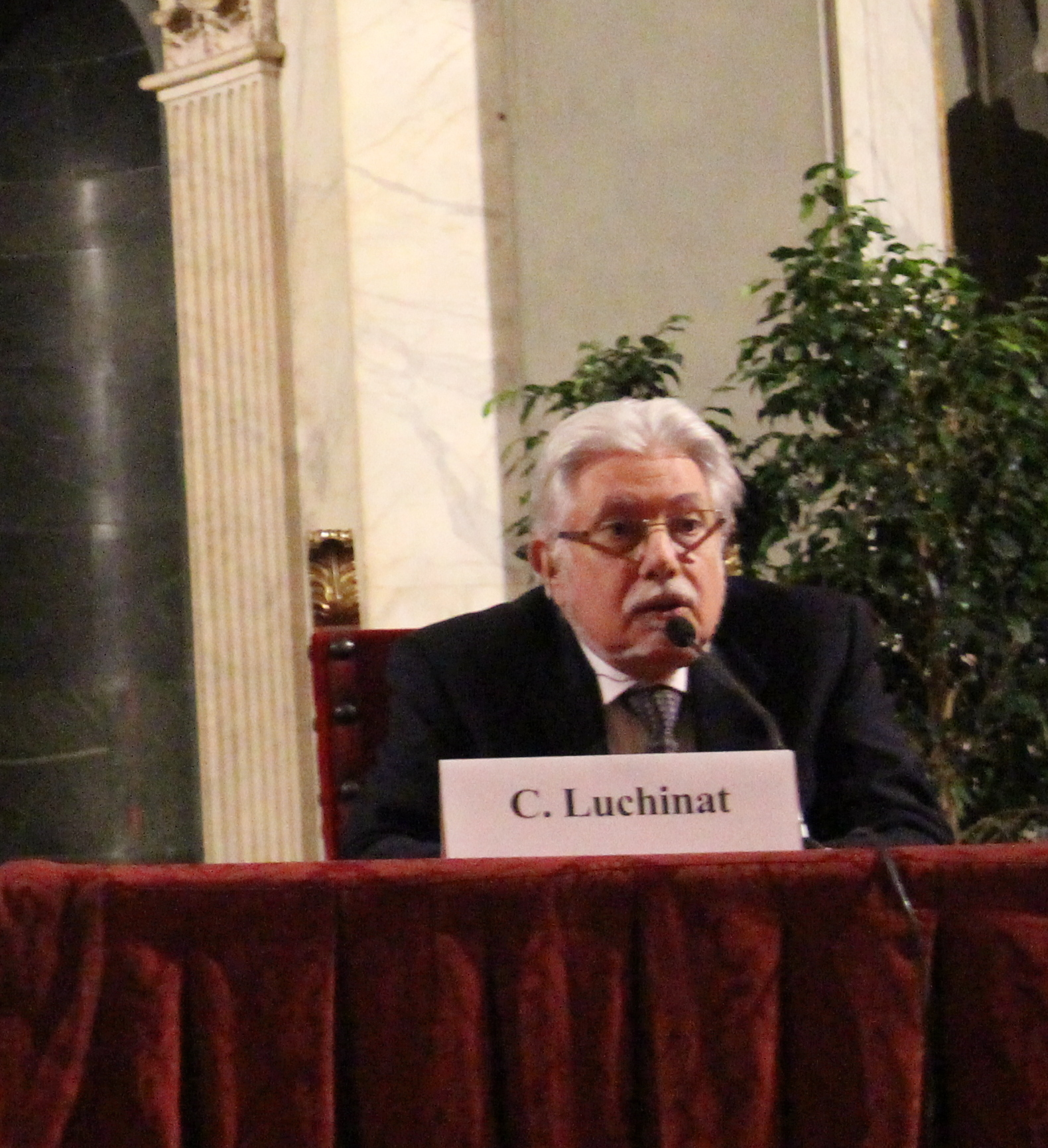
Claudio Luchinat

Claudio Luchinat (born February 15, 1952, in Florence) is an Italian chemist. He is author of about 550 publications in Bioinorganic Chemistry, NMR and Structural Biology, and of four books. According to Google scholar, his h-index is 90 and his papers have been quoted more than 33,000 times (As of 2022).

He earned a PhD in Chemistry from the University of Florence. He has been full professor of Chemistry at the University of Bologna (1986–96).

He is currently a researcher at the University of Florence and full professor of Chemistry at the same university (1996–, CERM and Department of Chemistry). He is member of the Italian Chemical Society, New York Academy of Sciences, American Association for the Advancement of Science.
