= Claudio De Pascalis =

Italian footballer (born 1982)

Personal information
- Full name: Claudio De Pascalis
- Date of birth: July 7, 1982 (age 44)
- Place of birth: San Pietro Vernotico , Italy
- Height: 1.77 m (5 ft 10 in)
- Position: Midfielder

Senior career*
Years	Team	Apps	(Gls)
2007	Fasano	8	(1)
2007–2008	Nardò		
2008–2009	Bari	10	(0)
2009	Noicattaro	10	(0)
2009–	Cosenza	9	(1)
- * Club domestic league appearances and goals as of 12:33, 23 April 2010 (UTC)

Claudio De Pascalis (born July 7, 1982) is an Italian footballer
