= Claudio Candotti =

Italian field hockey player (1942–2015)

Personal information
- Nationality: Italian
- Born: 29 November 1942 Trieste, Italy
- Died: 12 September 2015 (aged 72)

Sport
- Sport: Field hockey

Claudio Candotti (29 November 1942 – 12 September 2015) was an Italian field hockey player. He competed in the men's tournament at the 1960 Summer Olympics.
