= Claudi L. H. Bockting =

Dutch Clinical Psychologist and Professor

Claudi L. Bockting
- Born: Claudi L. Bockting; The Netherlands
- Education: University of Amsterdam
- Awards: Beck Institute International Fellowship (2016); Netherlands Institute for Advanced Studies in Humanities and Social Sciences Fellowship (2017); American Psychological Association IUPsyS Fellowship (2018-2019); World Health Organization Global Mental Health Fellowship (2018-2019); University of Amsterdam Institute for Advanced Studies Fellowship (2018-2019); Dr. Peter Moleman Penning Award, Psyfar (2020)
- Scientific career
- Fields: Clinical Psychology; Psychiatry; Network theory
- Workplaces: University of Amsterdam; Amsterdam University Medical Centers; Utrecht University; University of Groningen
- Thesis: The rhythm of depression: The course of recurrent depression and prevention of relapse using cognitive therapy (2006)
- Doctoral advisor: A.H. Schene, Ph. Spinhoven
- Website: https://www.claudibockting.com

Claudi Bockting is a Dutch clinical psychologist and Professor of Clinical Psychology in Psychiatry at the University of Amsterdams Faculty of Medicine, Amsterdam University Medical Centers. Her research program focuses on identifying etiological factors of common mental health disorders such as depression, anxiety disorders and substance abuse, and developing evidence-based psychotherapeutic interventions.

She has published more than 190 journal articles, is the author of several (self-help) books, and developed Preventive Cognitive Therapy, a version of cognitive behavioral therapy specifically developed for preventing relapse in individuals with a major depressive disorder. As one of the co-directors of the Centre for Urban Mental Health at the University of Amsterdam, her methods include applying network theory to the study of mental disorders in a public health setting.

Bockting serves as an expert on mental health conditions and treatment in several institutional functions throughout The Netherlands. She is a member of the scientific advisory boards at the Dutch Association for Psychotherapy (NVP, Nederlandse Vereniging voor Psychotherapie), the Dutch Research Council (NWO, Nederlandse Organisatie voor Wetenschappelijke Onderzoek), and the Dutch Health Institute (Zorginstituut Nederland). She is also the head of training at the postdoctoral training center for licensed health psychologists Cure & Care, and the president of the European Association for Clinical Psychology and Psychological Treatment.

== Early life and education ==
Bockting was born in The Netherlands. She studied psychology at the University of Amsterdam and received her cum laude master's degree in Clinical Psychology in 1993. Bockting finished her postdoctoral psychotherapy training at the RINO Utrecht in 1999 and subsequently worked as a licensed psychotherapist at the Amsterdam University Medical Centers in Amsterdam, where she started her PhD research on recurrent depression at the same time. In 2006, Bockting acquired her PhD from the University of Amsterdam, Faculty of Medicine, with her thesis: "The rhythm of depression: The course of recurrent depression and prevention of relapse using cognitive therapy".

== Career and research ==
After receiving her PhD from the University of Amsterdam in 2006, Bockting accepted a position as a Professor of Depression for Ethiology, Recidivism and Chronicity at the University of Groningen, which she held until 2014. From 2014 to 2017, Bockting was a Professor of Clinical Psychology at the Utrecht University. In 2017 she was appointed as Professor of Clinical Psychology in Psychiatry at the University of Amsterdam, University Medical Center, Department of Psychiatry. Bockting is named as the co-director of the Center for Urban Mental Health together with developmental psychologist Prof. Dr. Reinout Wiers, an interdisciplinary research priority area of the University of Amsterdam attached to the Netherlands Institute for Advanced Study. She has received several grants and academic prices, was a fellow at among others the World Health Organization, The Netherlands Institute for Advanced Study and the Beck Institute for Cognitive Behavior Therapy, and published more than 170 articles in academic journals.

=== Psychological interventions ===
Since her doctoral training, Bockting research focusses on the development and testing of sustainable psychological interventions for depression and relapse. Conducting both randomised controlled trials and meta-analyses, she repeatedly showed that pharmacological treatment is not superior to psychological interventions in preventing relapse. She developed and tested a cognitive-behavioural therapy protocol specifically designed to target relapse in patients with depression (Preventive Cognitive Therapy), which is currently also being tested to target remitted symptoms in recovered patients, and applied her findings to new forms of therapy. Together with partners, Bockting developed a digital app-based real-time intervention for youths with depression and anxiety disorders, which is tailored to the adolescents individual needs by using ecological momentary assessment data and network analysis.

=== Etiology and complex dynamics ===
As one of the directors of the Center for Urban Mental Health, Bocktings research is pioneering in the use of complex system methodology for understanding and treating common psychiatric disorders. Ongoing interdisciplinary dynamic network research projects aim to unravel feedback loops that contribute to the development of mental health conditions in urban areas, and design interventions for identified dynamic processes on micro-, meso- and macro-level with partners from multiple fields, such as health care providers, community institutions and the Municipality of Amsterdam. One such intervention based on network analysis principles that could potentially be used to act on the micro-level is the personalised monitoring and treatment app StayFine, that is currently being tested in a large randomised controlled trial.

These complexity-focused approaches base upon previous etiological meta-analytic studies Bockting conducted on potential psychological, social and biological factors and theories for the explanation of depression onset, and in which she did not find linear theories to be sufficient in explaining the occurrence and development of common mental health disorders.

=== Mental health in low and middle income countries ===
While a Global Mental Health Fellow at the World Health Organization, Bockting intensified her research on how to improve mental health care in low and middle income countries. Together with her PhD students, she specifically focusses on how to "bridge the mental health gap" between high income countries and low income countries using internet-based interventions. She conducted multiple systematic reviews on the current evidence for the effectiveness of digital interventions in low and middle income countries worldwide, an overview study on the impact of sociodemographic factors on the efficacy of such treatments, and a randomised controlled trial testing the efficacy of a newly developed online therapy using behavioral activation, acceptance training and lay counselling in Indonesia.

== Bibliography ==
- Bockting, Claudi L.H. (2009). Preventieve cognitieve training bij terugkerende depressie. Houten: Bohn Stafleu van Loghum. ISBN 9789031353071.
- Bockting, Claudi L. H. (2009). Niet meer depressief: werkboek voor de cliënt. Houten: Bohn Stafleu van Loghum. ISBN 9789031374274.
- Bockting, Claudi L.H. (2013). Tussen dip & droom: durf te voelen, doorbreek je patronen. Amsterdam: Spectrum. ISBN 9789000331710.
- Spinhoven, Philip, Claudi Bockting, Eric Ruhé, and Jan Spijker, eds. (2018). Comorbiditeit van psychische stoornissen. Utrecht: De Tijdstroom. ISBN 9789058981332.
- Bockting, C. L. H. (2025). Preventive Cognitive Therapy for Depression: An Evidence-Based Approach to Reduce Relapse Risk. Guilford Press. ISBN 9781462558445

== Editorials on Work ==
- Kirby, T. (2021). Claudi Bockting: preventing common mental health conditions. The Lancet Psychiatry, 8(2), 103. https://doi.org/10.1016/s2215-0366(20)30562-9
- Fava, G. A. (2018). Time to rethink the approach to recurrent depression. The Lancet Psychiatry, 5(5), 380–381. https://doi.org/10.1016/s2215-0366(18)30128-7
