= Claudio Vargas (disambiguation) =

Claudio Vargas (born 1978) is a Dominican former professional baseball pitcher.

Claudio Vargas may also refer to:

- Claudio Vargas (footballer, born 1985), Paraguayan midfielder
- Claudio Vargas (footballer, born 1996), Argentine centre-back
- Claudio Erasmo Vargas (born 1974), Mexican race walker
