= Claudio Chena =

Argentine footballer

Personal information
- Full name: Claudio Ubaldo Chena
- Date of birth: July 27, 1964 (age 62)
- Place of birth: Santa Fe, Argentina
- Position: Striker

Senior career*
Years	Team	Apps	(Gls)
1982–1986	Colón de Santa Fe	99	(19)
1986–1987	Talleres	27	(4)
1987	Oriente Petrolero	34	(20)
1988–1989	Blooming	45	(19)
1989	Estudiantes	12	(1)
1990–1991	Central Córdoba	42	(20)
1991–1992	Deportivo Morón	14	(1)
- * Club domestic league appearances and goals as of April 2008

Claudio Ubaldo Chena (born 27 July 1964) is an Argentine former football striker who played during the 1980s and early 1990s.

He played professionally for Colón de Santa Fe, Estudiantes de La Plata, Club Deportivo Morón, Central Córdoba (SdE) and Talleres de Córdoba in Argentina. He also spent some time playing in Bolivian football with Santa Cruz clubs Blooming and Oriente Petrolero.
