= Claudio Herrera =

Claudio Herrera may refer to:

- Claudio Herrera (musician), Mexican pianist
- Claudio Herrera (footballer) (born 1988), Uruguayan footballer
