= Claudio Mancini =

Italian politician (born 1969)

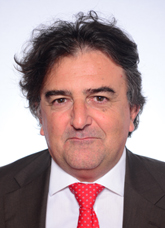
- Mancini in 2022

Member of the Chamber of Deputies
- Incumbent
- Assumed office 23 March 2018
- Constituency: Lazio 2 – P02 (2018–2022); Lazio 1 – P03 (2022–present)

Personal details
- Born: 22 February 1969 (age 57)
- Party: Democratic Party (since 2007)

Claudio Mancini (born 22 February 1969) is an Italian politician serving as a member of the Chamber of Deputies since 2018. From 2007 to 2010, he served as assessor for economic development, research, innovation and tourism of Lazio.

== Biography ==
Born on February 22, 1969, in Rome, he grew up in the Gianicolense neighborhood. A private-sector employee, he began his political career in the Italian Communist Party (PCI), with which he was elected councilor for Rome’s 16th Municipality in the 1989 local elections, becoming the PCI’s group leader in the municipality.

Following the dissolution of the Italian Communist Party (PCI) after Achille Occhetto “Bolognina Turn” in 1991, he joined the newly formed post-communist Democratic Party of the Left (PDS), and in the subsequent 1993 local elections, he was re-elected as a municipal councilor; in 1994, he became president of the PDS’s Rome XVI Municipal District.

In 1998, he joined Massimo D'Alema move from the PDS to the Democrats of the Left (DS), to unify the PDS with other forces on the Italian left and definitively “retire” the hammer-and-sickle symbol in favor of the social democratic rose. There, he held numerous positions within the DS leadership (official of the Roman federation and coordinator of the secretariat, official of the Regional Committee, and Head of Local Authorities).
