= Claudio Canaparo =

Argentine philosopher (born 1962)

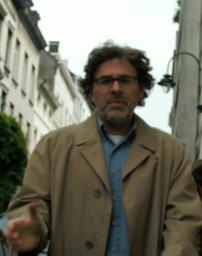
- Born: 7 October 1962 (age 64)

Philosophical work
- Era: 21st-century philosophy
- Region: Contemporary philosophy
- School: Latin American thinking, continental philosophy
- Main interests: Radical constructivism; History of Concepts; Anthropology and Colonialism; Geo-epistemology; Speculative Anthropology

Claudio Canaparo (born October 7, 1962) is currently a visiting professor at Universidad de Quilmes, in Argentina. He has written as a literary critic, epistemologist, sociology of culture analyst and philosopher.

== Education and career ==
Canaparo was born in the city port of Campana, Buenos Aires, Argentina, to a mother of Hebrew origins and an Italian rooted father; he was a traveller, manual worker and scientific researcher before entering academia. He studied at the Faculty of Political Science at the University of Rosario, at the Facultad Latinoamericana de Ciencias Sociales (FLACSO) in Buenos Aires, at the DAMS (delle arti, della musica e dello spettacolo) at the Università degli Studi di Bologna, and received his Ph.D. under the supervision of William Rowe at King's College London in 2000.

He joined the Faculty of Arts at Exeter University in 1995 where he created the Centre for Latin American Studies. In 2009 he was appointed Visiting Professor at Birkbeck College, where he stays until 2015. He was also Associated Researcher at the Université Catholique de Louvain-la-Neuve in Belgium between 2007 and 2012.

In 2012 he started to supervise and teach within the postgraduate program from the Universidad Nacional de Quilmes and from Universidad Nacional de Buenos Aires, both in Argentina. In the same year he developed a project of teaching basic philosophy to 8–10 years old children from ‘Arc-en-Ciel’ public school of Feugarolles in France. From 2015 he has been also professor of philosophy at the Académie de Bordeaux in France.

== Themes and related subjects ==
The principal effort of his work goes to establish the relation between knowledge and conceptual evolution, mainly focused on theories and related concepts about space with peripheral areas of the planet or, more precisely, having the peripheral spaces of the planet as its main intellectual frame. Themes of his works also include sociology of knowledge (Muerte y transfiguración de la cultura rioplatense, 2005), epistemology (Geo-epistemology. Latin America and the Location of Knowledge, 2009) and colonialism (La cuestión periférica. Heidegger, Derrida, Europa, 2021), authorship theory (The Manufacture of an Author, 2000; El mundo Ingaramo, 2015), and science and writing (Ciencia y escritura, 2003).

In the 2010s he was working in relation with the radical changes that the Anthropocene conditions of the biosphere has in terms of speculation and thinking, always in peripheral areas of the planet (El mundo de atrás. Efecto antropoceno y especulación en los ámbitos periféricos, 2019; El pensamiento basura. Transitoriedad, materia, viaje y mundo periférico, 2017). More specifically, he is trying to explore the growing entanglement between thinking and anthropology, and the consequences, on peripheral areas of planet, of the classical philosophical tradition of using cartesian-kantian ways of conceptualization to justify a theory of understanding (El fin de la naturaleza. Fallo y propósito en la especulación. Antropología de la naturaleza en la periferia, 2023).

More recently he had been working on the consequences and possibilities that a radical standing concerning academic institutions, post-colonialism, climate change and the mercantilization of knowledge have in terms of understanding and savoir-faire within peripheral areas of planet (Insurrección nativa. Antropofósiles, inhumanismo, especulación, 2024). Equally, he is working in an intellectual and conceptual history written from an ethnographical reversal standpoint (Derrotero en falta. Memoria etnográfica, 2025). More recently, his focus was set on formulating a notion of understanding as a tool to determine what can be considered as politics in terms of Anthropocene and from a peripheral point of view (Bios politikos. Viviente y no-viviente en la especulación, 2025).

== Select bibliography ==
=== Books ===
- (2025) Derrotero en falta. Memoria etnográfica.
- (2025) Bios politikos. Viviente y no-viviente en la especulación.
- (2024) Insurrección nativa. Antropofósiles, inhumanismo, especulación.
- (2023) El fin de la naturaleza. Fallo y propósito en la especulación. Antropología de la naturaleza en la periferia.
- (2023) El pensamiento basura. Transitoriedad, materia, viaje y mundo periférico. New edition.
- (2021) La cuestión periférica. Heidegger, Derrida, Europa.
- (2019) El mundo de atrás. Efecto antropoceno y especulación en los ámbitos periféricos.
- (2017) El pensamiento basura. Transitoriedad, materia, viaje y mundo periférico.
- (2015) El mundo Ingaramo.
- (2011) El imaginario Patagonia. Ensayo acerca de la evolución conceptual del espacio.
- (2009) Geo-Epistemology. Latin America and the Location of Knowledge.
- (2007) El enigma de lo real (ed. with Geneviève Fabry).
- (2005) Muerte y transfiguración de la cultura rioplatense: breve tratado sobre el pensamiento del espacio en el Río de la Plata, 1830-1980.
- (2004) Ciencia y escritura. Una historia retórica e intelectual de "Nature" 1869-1999.
- (2001) El perlonghear. Postulados de un pensamiento posracionalista.
- (2000) Imaginación, mapas, escritura. Noción de espacio y perspectiva cognitiva.
- (2000) The Manufacture of an Author. Reinaldo Arenas’s literary world, his readers and other contemporaries.
- (2000) Jorge Luis Borges. Intervenciones sobre pensamiento y literatura.
- (1998) El artificio como cuestión. Conjeturas en torno a Respiración artificial.

=== Articles/ chapters in books ===
- ‘De Pigafetta a Malaspina. La imagen viajera patagónica’, en Tomás Sansón Corbo/Israel Sanmartín, (coords.), Clío en las riberas oceánicas: Temas y problemas de la historiografía iberoamericana (siglos XVI-XIX), La Plata: Universidad Nacional de La Plata/Universidad de Cantabria, 2025, pp. 457-471.
- ‘La periferia como una construcción historiográfica’, en Israel San Martin/Arturo Alonzo Padilla, eds., Debates historiográficos desde la periferia, A Coruña: Universidade da Coruña, 2025, pp. 15-30.
- (with Sergio Pedernera) ‘Sangre, espacio y cartografía’, en Mataderos. Pampa y asfalto, Buenos Aires: Dirección General patrimonio, museos y casco histórico, 2022, pp. 17-35.
- ‘Diéresis y acontecer en The Imaginary Agent (1985) de Edmundo Benaján’, en Claudia Hammerschmidt, ed. Patagonia literaria II. Funciones, proyecciones e intervenciones de autoría estratégica en la nueva literatura patagónica, Potsdam: INOLAS, 2016, pp. 445–459.
- ‘La especulación cartográfica’, in Sergio Pedernera, ed., Ars Cartographica. Cartografía histórica de Buenos Aires 1830–1889, Buenos Aires: Dirección General Patrimonio e Instituto Histórico, 2015, pp. 17–20.
- ‘Film and Migration in Latin America’, in Immanuel Ness, ed. Encyclopaedia of Global Human Migration, London: Wiley Blackwell, 2013.
- ‘El pensamiento del ojo’, in Israel Sanmartín Barros/Patricia Calvo González/Eduardo Rey Tristán, eds., Historia(s), imagen(es) y lenguaje(s) en América Latina y Europa, Santiago: Universidad de Santiago de Compostela, 2012, pp. 125–141.
- (with André-Jean Arnaud, Érika Patino Cardoso, Marco Aurélio Serau Junior, Ricardo Rollo Duarte) ‘Frontières’, in André-Jean Arnaud (ed.), Dictionnaire de la globalisation, Paris: L. G. D. J., 2010, pp. 226–228.
- (with Guilherme Figueiredo Leite Gonçalves, Márcio Alves Fonseca) ‘Gouvernabilité’, in André-Jean Arnaud (ed.), Dictionnaire de la globalisation, Paris: L. G. D. J., 2010, pp. 263–265.
- (with Guilherme Figueiredo Leite Gonçalves, Márcio Alves Fonseca, Orlando Villas Bôas Filho) ‘Pouvoir’, in André-Jean Arnaud (ed.), Dictionnaire de la globalisation, Paris: L. G. D. J., 2010, pp. 415–419.
- ‘Geo-Epistemología’ in Hugo E. Biagini/Arturo Roig (dirs.), Diccionario de pensamiento alternativo II, available at www.cecies.org. Project of ‘Pensamiento Latinoamericano Alternativo’, based at the University of Lanús, Argentina.
- ‘Science and Empire. The Geo-epistemic Location of Knowledge’ in P. Lorenzano, H-J Rheinberger, E. Ortiz and C. Galles, eds., History and Philosophy of Science and Technology, Oxford: UNESCO/EOLSS Publishers, 2008.
- ‘La consumación del realismo’ in G. Fabry/C. Canaparo (eds.), El enigma de lo real, Bern: Peter Lang], 2007 pp. 199–275.
- ‘The <Nature effect> in Latin American Science Publications’ in E. Ortiz/E. Fishburn (eds.): Science and the Creative Imagination in Latin America], London: [Institute for the Study of the Americas], 2005, pp. 97–118.
- ‘Marconi and other Artifices: Long-range Technology and the Conquest of the Desert’ in J. Andermann/W. Rowe (eds.), Images of Power. Iconography Culture and the State in Latin America], Toronto, 2005, pp. 241–254.
- ‘Medir, trazar, ver. Arte cartográfico y pensamiento en Jorge Eduardo Eielson’ in José Ignacio Padilla (ed.), Nu/do. Homenaje a J. E. Eielson, Lima: Pontificia Universidad Católica del Perú], 2002, pp. 289–314.
- ‘De bibliographica ratio’ in W. Rowe et al. (editors): Jorge Luis Borges. Intervenciones sobre pensamiento y literatura, Barcelona/Buenos Aires: Paidós, 2000, pp. 199–247.
- Encyclopedia of Latin American Literature, London: Fitzroy Dearborn Publishers, 1997, 926 pp. Articles on: (1)‘GELMAN, Juan (1930- ) ’; (2)‘Juan Gelman: el juego en que andamos’; (3)‘Cambaceres, Eugenio (1843-1888)’; (4)‘ORTIZ, Juan Laurentino (1896-1978)’; (5)‘SORIANO, Osvaldo (1943- ) ’; (6)‘El juguete rabioso en las Aguafuertes porteñas’; (7)‘El astillero’; (8)‘Ibarguengoitia, Jorge (1928-1983)’; (9)‘Yañez, Agustín (1904-1980)’.

=== Articles in journals ===
- ‘A dónde ir, qué hacer. Periferia y latourismo’, in Revista Orillera, Universidad Nacional de Avellaneda, Buenos Aires, año 3, num. 4, primavera 2018, pp. 63–68.
- ‘Historia especulativa del presente’, in Historiografías, número 15, Enero-Junio, 2018, pp. 16–21. Doi 10.26754/ojs_historiografias/21744289
- ‘Más allá del fin del mundo: Seguridad, violencia, territorio’, in Vegueta. Anuario de la Facultad de Geografía e Historia, número 17, 2017, pp. 279–298.
- ‘La idea de revolución en la periferia’, en SÉMATA, Ciencias Sociais e Humanidades, 2016, vol. 28: 29–55.
- ‘Was ist Aufklärung? o la teoría del iLuminismo’ in Pensamiento de los Confines, University of Buenos Aires, número 29, mayo 2013, pp. 171–176.
- ‘El Antropoceno argentino’, in Revista Orillera, Universidad Nacional de Avellaneda, Buenos Aires, año 1, num. 1, invierno 2016, pp. 67–71.
- ‘Migration and radical constructivist epistemology’, in Crossings: Journal of Migration and Culture, volume 3, number 2, pp. 181–200, 2012.
- ‘Para una fisiología de las condiciones del especular. Posthumanismo, pensamiento e historiografía europea en la periferia’, in Pensamiento de los Confines, University of Buenos Aires, número 27, marzo 2011, pp. 136–156.
- (Co-authored with Luis Rebaza-Soraluz and William Rowe) ‘Introduccción’, in Latin American Studies in the UK, Bulletin of Spanish Studies (Glasgow), volume LXXXIV, Numbers 4–5, pp. 441–445.
- ‘Ciencia y tecnología en El Eternauta’ in Revista Iberoamericana, University of Pittsburgh, volumen 73, number 221, Oct-Dec 2007, 871-886.
- ‘Arte y desencanto en Elias Ingaramo’ in Bulletin of Hispanic Studies], Liverpool, volume 84, number 3, pp. 335–346, 2007.
- ‘La finalidad literaria’ in Pensamiento de los Confines, University of Buenos Aires/Fondo de Cultura Económica, número 19, diciembre 2006, pp. 112–118.
- ‘De poiesis sive poetica. Notas para una fisiología del lenguaje’ in Aleph. Revista de literatura hispanoamericana, Université de Liège/Catholique de Louvain, número 20, enero de 2006, pp. 81–104.
- ‘Un mundo modernista para la cultura rioplatense’ in Bulletin of Spanish Studies] (Glasgow), volume LXXIX, numbers 2–3, March–May 2002, pp. 193–209.
- ‘El mapa borgeano y sus alrededores’ in INTI. Revista Literaria Hispánica], Providence, Brown University, number 48, 1998, pp. 3–18.
- ‘Juan José Saer interviewed’ in Travesia. Journal of Latin American Cultural Studies], [London], volume 4, number 1, June 1995.
