= Claudio Apollonio =

Italian ice hockey player

Personal information
- Nationality: Italian
- Born: 21 August 1921; Cortina d'Ampezzo, Italy
- Died: 16 December 2008 (aged 87); Cortina d'Ampezzo, Italy

Sport
- Sport: Ice hockey

Claudio Apollonio (21 August 1921 – 16 December 2008) was an Italian ice hockey player. He competed in the men's tournament at the 1948 Winter Olympics.
