= Claudio Di Coste =

Italian volleyball player (born 1954)

Personal information
- Born: 13 August 1954 (age 71) Rome, Italy
- Height: 2.07 m (6 ft 9 in)
- Weight: 100 kg (220 lb)

Sport
- Sport: Volleyball
- Club: SS Lazio, Rome
Medal record
Representing Italy
World Championships
Silver medal – second place	1978 Rome	Team

Claudio Di Coste (born 13 August 1954) is a retired Italian volleyball player. He was part of Italian teams that finished second at the 1978 World Championships and ninth at the 1980 Summer Olympics.
