= Claudio Vekstein =

Argentine architect

- Born: 5 February 1965 (age 61); Buenos Aires
- Occupation: Architect
- Practice: Arizona State University, Claudio Vekstein Architects

Claudio Vekstein (born February 5, 1965, in Buenos Aires, Argentina ) is an architect from Argentina and has been running his own architecture practice, teaching and researching the relationship between the architecture discipline, the public work and the Public Interest.

== History ==
Born in 1965 in Buenos Aires, Argentina, he studied at the Faculty of Architecture and Urbanism of the University of Buenos Aires, later he became disciple of South American master architect Amancio Williams, and completed Master Studies at the Frankfurt Art Academy Städelschule in Germany under Profs. Enric Miralles and Peter Cook.

== Teaching ==
He is a tenured Professor in the Masters of Architecture Program, School of Architecture and Landscape Architecture, Arizona State University, United States (since 2002), and has run his practice specializing in the Architecture of Public Works and Urban Infrastructure, both in Buenos Aires Argentina (since 1996), and in Phoenix Arizona (since 2002).

== Works ==
His built works include the Extension for the Fine Arts School and Access to the Ernesto de la Cárcova Museum (1996-02), the Monument Homage to Amancio Williams (1999), River Coast Park and Amphitheater (2000–01), Institute for Rehabilitation of the Disabled (2001–04), Emergency Room for Vicente López Hospital (2004–05), all in Buenos Aires, and the Memorial Square for the Monument to Ernesto “Che” Guevara’s 80th Anniversary at his birth-town Rosario, Santa Fe, Argentina (2007–08); other projects are on the way to construction in Arizona. His work has been published and exhibited in Argentina, Brazil, México, US, Spain, Germany, Holland, Austria, South Africa.

== Awards ==
- Annual Award by the Professional Architects Council of Buenos Aires Province, Argentina (2001)
- Vitruvio Award for Integration of Art and Architecture by the National Fine Arts Museum Buenos Aires (2002)
- ACSA Faculty Design Award, by the Association of Collegiate Schools of Architecture, US (2003)
- First Prize for the Latin-American Award on Hospital Architecture and Engineering by the Association of Hospital Architecture and Buenos Aires Architects Association (2006)
- First Prize for the Architecture, Urbanism and Theory Biennale granted by the Professional Architects Council of Buenos Aires Province, Argentina, (2007)
