= Claudio Baccalà =

Swiss painter

Claudio Baccalà (1923–2007) was a Swiss painter from Ticino. Employed as a farmer and shepherd, Baccalà was never formally trained as an artist, but spent 60 years painting in the atelier next to his house in Brissago. He frequently travelled, displaying his work in Basel and Zurich, and formed a friendship with Jean Dubuffet.
