= Claudio Barigozzi =

Italian biologist and geneticist

Claudio Barigozzi (1909 – 5 August 1996) was an Italian biologist and geneticist.

Barigozzi taught genetics at the University of Milan in 1948, and was a scholar of the transmission of hereditary traits using Drosophila and Artemia as model organisms.

An adviser of the Centro Lombardo per l'incremento della Orto-floro-frutticoltura in Minoprio, Italy, he promoted genetic research as a member of the Italian National Research Council's committee for the study of genetics in 1961, of the scientific board of the National Genetics Centre in Rome in 1963, and other Italian and foreign academies. His more proficient pupils include the geneticists Ercole Ottaviano, Giuseppe Gavazzi, and Alessandro Camussi.
