= Claudio Gruenberg =

Peruvian footballer (born 2000)

Personal information
- Full name: Claudio León Gruenberg Solari
- Date of birth: 8 April 2000 (age 26)
- Place of birth: Lima, Peru
- Position: Midfielder

Youth career
- Deportivo Municipal

Senior career*
| Years | Team | Apps | (Gls) |
| 2019–2021 | Deportivo Municipal | 0 | (0) |
| 2019 | → Unión Huaral (loan) | 2 | (0) |
| 2022 | Calamocha | 9 | (0) |
- * Club domestic league appearances and goals as of 15:49, 24 July 2022 (UTC)

Claudio León Gruenberg Solari (born 8 April 2000) is a Peruvian footballer who plays as a midfielder.

== Career ==
=== Club career ===
Gruenberg is a product of Deportivo Municipal. In the summer 2019, he was loaned out to Peruvian Segunda División club Unión Huaral, where he made a total off two appearances.

On 1 February 2022, Gruenberg signed with Spanish Tercera División side CF Calamocha. He got his debut for the club on 20 February 2022 against CD Cariñena. He left the club at the end of the season.
