= Claudio Ortiz =

Argentinean association football player

Personal information
- Full name: Claudio Daniel Ortiz
- Date of birth: 29 July 1981 (age 45)
- Place of birth: Argentina
- Positions: Midfielder; forward

Senior career*
Years	Team	Apps	(Gls)
	Club Atlético River Plate	0	(0)
2002-2003	Club Deportivo Mac Allister		
2004-2005	Club Atlético El Linqueño	50	(24)
2006	Club Atlético Sarmiento	37	(9)
2007	Wydad AC		
2010	Atenas de San Carlos	2	(0)
2010-2011	Club Almagro	16	(1)
2017	Club Atlético Belgrano		
- * Club domestic league appearances and goals

Claudio Ortiz (born 29 July 1981) is an Argentinean retired footballer.
