= Claudio Corti =

Claudio Corti may refer to:

- Claudio Corti (climber) (1928–2010), Italian mountain climber
- Claudio Corti (cyclist) (born 1955), Italian professional racing cyclist
- Claudio Corti (motorcycle racer) (born 1987), Italian Grand Prix motorcycle racer
