= Claudio Santorum =

Argentine lawyer and international civil servant

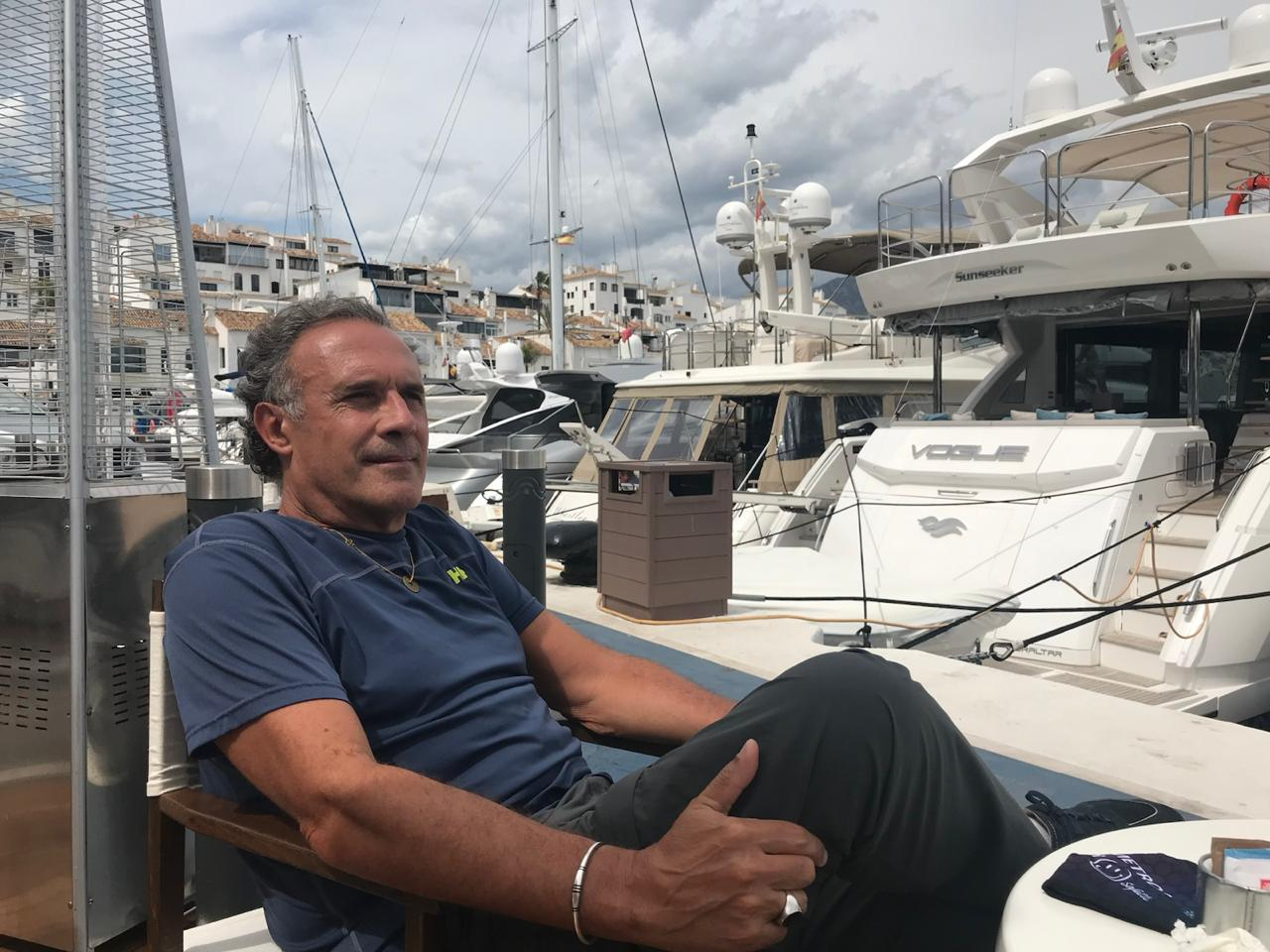

Claudio Damian Rodriguez Santorum is an Argentine-born lawyer and international civil servant.

== Experience ==
He was Regional Director of the American Bar Association (ABA-CEELI) for Central and Eastern Europe, with the mission of promoting the strengthening of Criminal Justice institutions.

In 2003 survived the attack on the Canal Hotel, headquarters of the United Nations offices in Baghdad, and survived the 2010 Haiti earthquake.

He was appointed in 2010, by the Director General of the United Nations Office on Drugs and Crime (UNODC), Yuri Fedotov, Coordinator of the Pacto Santo Domingo (SICA-UNODC Mechanism) to promote the fight against drug trafficking and organized crime in the Central American and Caribbean Regions.

In 2012, the Honorable Sang-hyun Song, President of the International Criminal Court (ICC) nominated him as a candidate for the position of Secretary of the high court based in The Hague.

Late in his international career, served as Chief of Mission in charge of the United Nations International Organization for Migration in Guatemala (UN/Migration-IOM), as well as Director of Programs of the USG addressing the crisis of irregular migrants heading north of the continent.
