= Claudio Maffei =

Italian footballer (born 1999)

Personal information
- Date of birth: 23 December 1999 (age 26)
- Place of birth: Bari, Italy
- Height: 1.77 m (5 ft 10 in)
- Position: Forward

Team information
- Current team: Bisceglie

Youth career
- –2018: Bari
- 2016–2017: → Fidelis Andria (loan)

Senior career*
Years	Team	Apps	(Gls)
2018–2021	Pisa	1	(0)
2019	→ Olbia (loan)	11	(1)
2019–2020	→ Lecco (loan)	15	(0)
2020–2021	→ Pro Sesto (loan)	25	(0)
2021–2022	Fiorenzuola	8	(0)
2022	→ Viterbese (loan)	4	(0)
2022–2023	Bitonto	32	(14)
2023–2025	Martina	9	(1)
2025	Gravina	13	(0)
2025–	Bisceglie		
- * Club domestic league appearances and goals as of 23 November 2025

Claudio Maffei (born 23 December 1999) is an Italian professional footballer who plays as a forward for Eccellenza club Bisceglie.

== Club career ==
Formed on Bari youth system, Maffei was signed by Pisa in 2018. After, was loaned to Serie C clubs Olbia, Lecco and Pro Sesto.

On 28 July 2021, he joined to Serie C club Fiorenzuola. On 27 January 2022, he was loaned to Viterbese.

== Career statistics ==
=== Club ===
As of match played 28 August 2021

Appearances and goals by club, season and competition
Club	Season	League			National Cup		Other		Total	
Club	Season	Division	Apps	Goals	Apps	Goals	Apps	Goals	Apps	Goals
Pisa	2018–19	Serie C	1	0	0	0	1 (Note: Appearance(s) in Coppa Italia Serie C)	0	2	0
Olbia (loan)	2018–19	Serie C	11	1	0	0	—		10	1
Lecco (loan)	2019–20	Serie C	15	0	0	0	2	0	17	0
Pro Sesto (loan)	2020–21	Serie C	25	0	0	0	—		25	0
Fiorenzuola	2021–22	Serie C	1	0	0	0	—		1	0
Career total			53	1	0	0	3	0	55	1
