= Claudio Cipelletti =

Italian film director

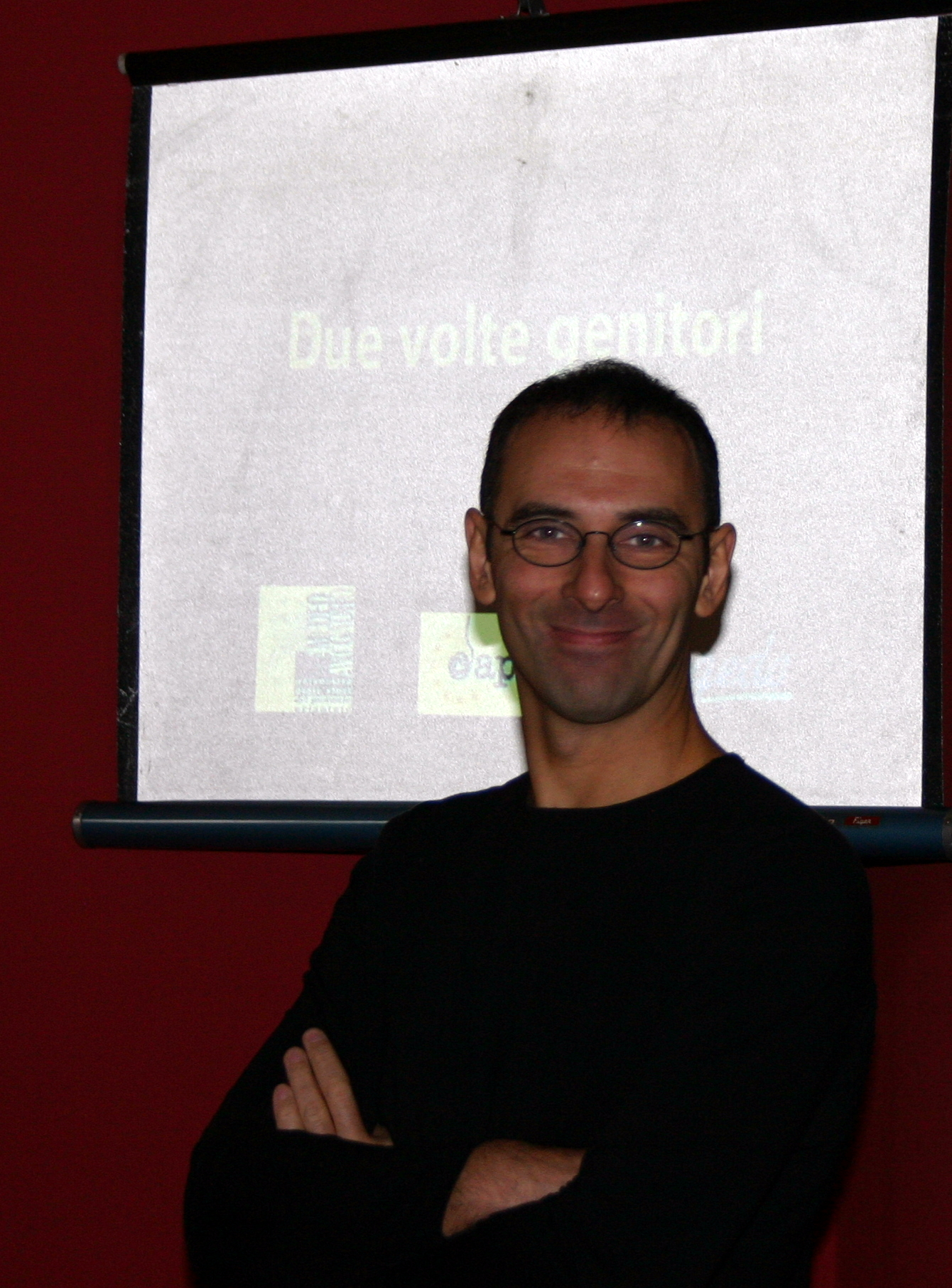
- Born: 1962 (age 63–64); Piacenza, Italy
- Occupation: Film director
- Years active: 1989 - present

Claudio Cipelletti (born 1962) is an Italian film director.

Claudio Cipelletti was born in Milan, Italy, in 1962.

He graduated in Architecture at Milan University and then in film-direction at the Cinema School of Milan. He developed his professional activity both as video editor for corporate videos and as independent film-maker. His short films and documentaries have been presented in several LGBT film festivals round the world.

Since 2002 he has taught editing at the IULM University and at the Cinema and new Media School of Milan.

== Filmography ==
- 1990: Pumori '90 - 60' super8 film/BetaSP - documentary about Italian himalayan expedition - 1990
- 1994: Il mondo diviso (The split world) - 12' 16 mm - Italy, 1994
- 1994: Epitaffio - 30' 16 mm Italy 1994 (co-directed with Ruta, Stambrini, Brusaferri)
- 1997: Tuttinpiazza - four 60' video documentaries about the Italian gay movement - Italy 1994-1997
- 1997: Altre Storie (Love Affairs) - 14' 35mm - Italy 1997 (co-directed with Valerio Governi)
- 1998: Nessuno Uguale (No two alike) - 56' documentary - Beta SP - Agedo and Provincia of Milan, 1998
- 2008: Due volte genitori (Parents reborn) - 96' documentary - Beta SP - Agedo/European Comm. 2008
