= Claudio Tommaso Gnoli =

Italian information scientist (born 1969)

Claudio Tommaso Gnoli (born 19 March 1969 in Milan, Italy) is an Italian information scientist, focused on knowledge organization (KO), in particular in such ontological views as emergentist evolutionism, the theory of levels of reality and General System Theory, as philosophical foundations for both existing and new KO systems. He is known particularly for testing the potential of a classification by phenomena (meant as the objects of knowledge) as opposed to disciplines., of which the "most advanced—and most fully functional—example created to date is Gnoli's own Integrative Levels Classification (ILC)"

He has been described as "a leading light in ISKO/Italy and other organizations". In a 2016 bibliometric study, Araujo and Guimarães identified Gnoli as a central researcher, and showed his relations to other researchers within the field of knowledge organization. .
