= Claudio Barroso Gomes =

Brazilian politician and trade unionist (1952–2025)

Municipal council of São Paulo
- In office 1983–1988

Personal details
- Born: 28 September 1952 São Paulo, São Paulo, Brazil
- Died: 16 October 2025 (aged 73) São Caetano do Sul, São Paulo, Brazil
- Party: Workers' Party
- Occupation: Metalworker; Trade unionist Politician
- Known for: Founding member of the Workers' Party, São Paulo City Councilman
- Nickname: Capeta

Claudio Barroso Gomes (28 September 1952 – 16 October 2025), was a Brazilian metalworker, trade unionist, and politician affiliated with the Workers' Party (PT). He was a city councilman in São Paulo during the ninth legislative session between 1983 and 1988.

== Biography ==
A metalworker in the city of São Paulo, Claudio joined the trade union movement that gained strength in the region in the 1970s. He was one of the founders of the Workers' Party (PT), a party that emerged from this context of labour unrest and whose main political representative is Luiz Inácio Lula da Silva.

During the 1982 municipal elections in São Paulo, he was a candidate for the PT for the position of city councillor. Due to Institutional Act Number Three signed by the military dictatorship, the election was not based on a majority vote, meaning that only representatives of the legislature could be elected. After winning 23,426 votes, he was elected to office. He was one of the first five councillors from the party to be elected by the city of São Paulo, the largest in the country, along with names such as Luiza Erundina, who would become mayor of the city in 1989. This legislative session coincided with the end of the military dictatorship and the beginning of the country's redemocratisation process. During his time as a councilman, Claudio served as 2nd Secretary of the party in the Chamber between 1985 and 1987, in addition to serving on committees on transportation, health, and civil service.

After his experience as a councilman, he did not return to public office, but continued to be active in the party. He died on 16 October 2025, at the age of 72. His body was laid in state in the city of São Caetano do Sul. The São Paulo City Council and President Luiz Inácio Lula da Silva issued statements of condolence.
