= Cláudio de Oliveira =

Brazilian cartoonist

- Occupations: Cartoonist, caricaturist
- Notable work: Pittadas de Maluf
- Awards: Troféu HQ Mix (1999) – "Book of Cartoons"; Prêmio Vladimir Herzog (2020) – "Continued Vladimir Herzog Special Award"

Cláudio de Oliveira is a Brazilian cartoonist who has worked with political cartoons since 1977, when he began drawing for the newspaper O Pasquim. He became journalist at the Federal University of Rio Grande do Norte (UFRN). He studied Graphic Arts in Prague, Czechoslovakia, from 1989 to 1992.

In 1999, he won the 11th Troféu HQ Mix in the category "Book of Cartoons" with the publication Pittadas de Maluf, released by Boitempo. The book compiled a selection of drawings that he had published on the cover of the newspaper Folha da Tarde since 1996.

In 2020, Cláudio received the Prêmio Vladimir Herzog in the category "Continued Vladimir Herzog Special Award" alongside 109 other cartoonists who participated in the "Charge Continuada" movement. The project involved hundreds of artists recreating a political cartoon by Renato Aroeira that became the target of a government investigation for allegedly associating president Jair Bolsonaro with Nazism.
