= Claudio Rodríguez Cataldo =

Chilean politician

Claudio Rodríguez
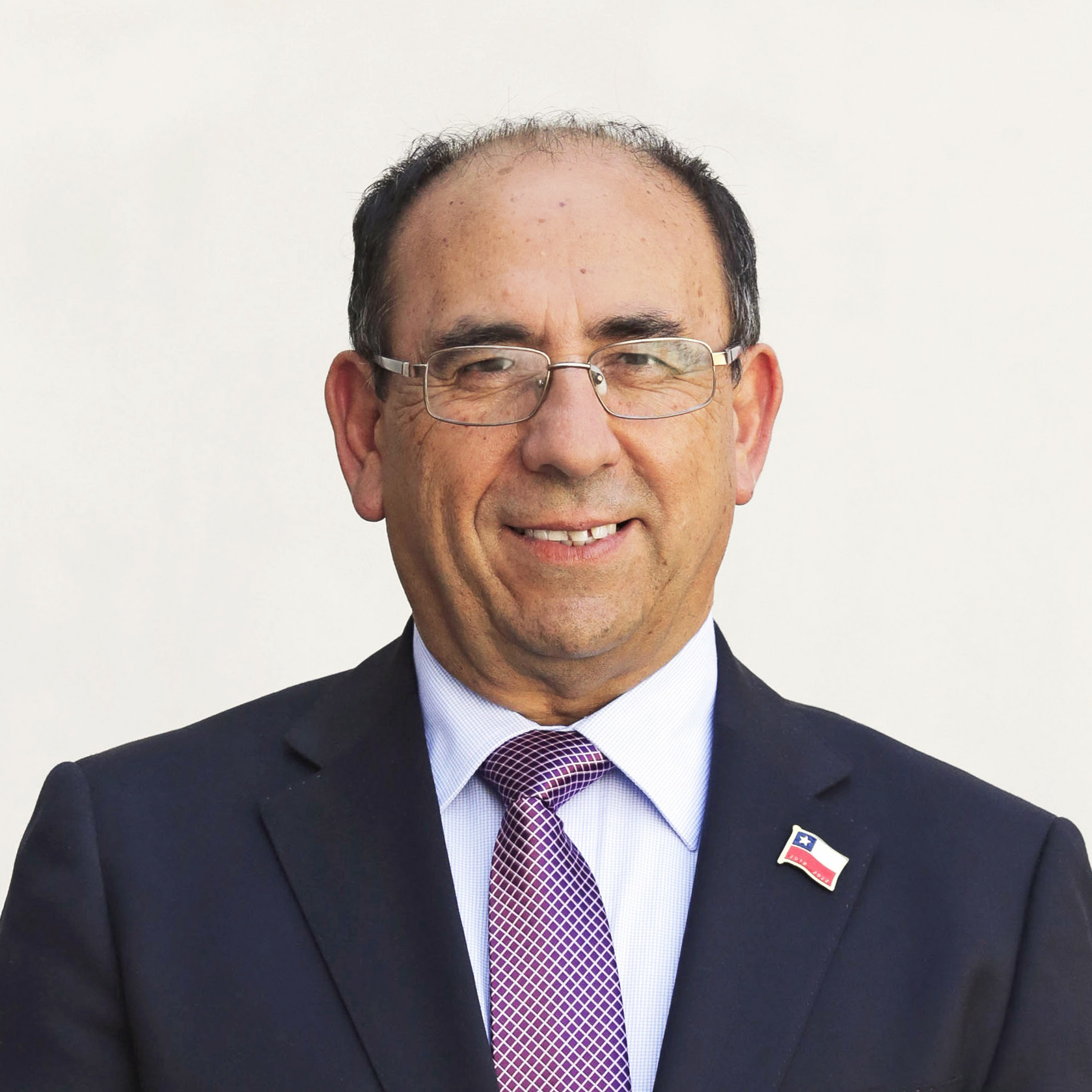

Governor of the San Felipe Province
- In office 11 March 2018 – 14 July 2021
- Preceded by: Eduardo León
- Succeeded by: Dissolution of the position

Member of the Chamber of Deputies
- In office 11 March 1990 – 11 March 1998
- Preceded by: District created
- Succeeded by: Patricio Cornejo Vidaurrazaga
- Constituency: 11th District

Mayor of San Felipe
- In office 5 August 1987 – 8 August 1989
- President: Augusto Pinochet
- Preceded by: Marcela Cucurella
- Succeeded by: Renato Chacón Blanchot

Personal details
- Born: 24 September 1954 (age 72) San Felipe, Chile
- Party: Renovación Nacional
- Education: Pontifical Catholic University of Valparaíso (LL.B)
- Profession: Business manager Lawyer

Claudio Rodríguez Cataldo (born 1 May 1950) is a Chilean business manager and politician who served as deputy.

== Biography ==
He was born in San Felipe on 28 September 1954, the son of Raquel del Carmen Cataldo Rodríguez and Claudio Rodríguez Magna. He married Isabel Gómez Gómez and is the father of three children.

He completed his secondary education at the Instituto Abdón Cifuentes of San Felipe. He pursued higher education at the Pontifical Catholic University of Valparaíso, where he studied Commerce.

Professionally, he held numerous positions, including Accountant of the Municipality of Valparaíso and Director of Administration and Finance of the Quilpué. He also directed the Centro de Desarrollo Integral para la Educación y Cultura of San Felipe.

He completed a Diploma in Business Management at the Pontifical Catholic University of Chile and served as manager of the Instituto de Seguridad del Trabajo.

== Political career ==
On 27 July 1987, he was appointed Mayor of San Felipe, serving until 8 August 1989. He later joined National Renewal, working to organize the party’s regional structure. In 1990, he founded the Corporación para el Desarrollo de Aconcagua, carrying out a similar initiative in Putaendo in 1993.

In the 1989 parliamentary elections, he was elected Deputy for District No. 11—comprising the communes of Los Andes, San Esteban, Calle Larga, Rinconada, San Felipe, Putaendo, Santa María, Panquehue, Llaillay, and Catemu in the Valparaíso Region—for the 1990–1994 term, obtaining 20,832 votes (20.79% of valid votes). In 1993, he was re-elected for District No. 11 with 29,213 votes (27.96% of valid votes). In 1997, he ran again for re-election but was not elected.

In 2009, he again ran for the Chamber of Deputies for District No. 11, Valparaíso Region (2010–2014 term), but was not elected.

On 11 March 2018, he was appointed Governor of the Province of San Felipe by President Sebastián Piñera.
