= Claudio Detto =

Italian painter (born 1950)

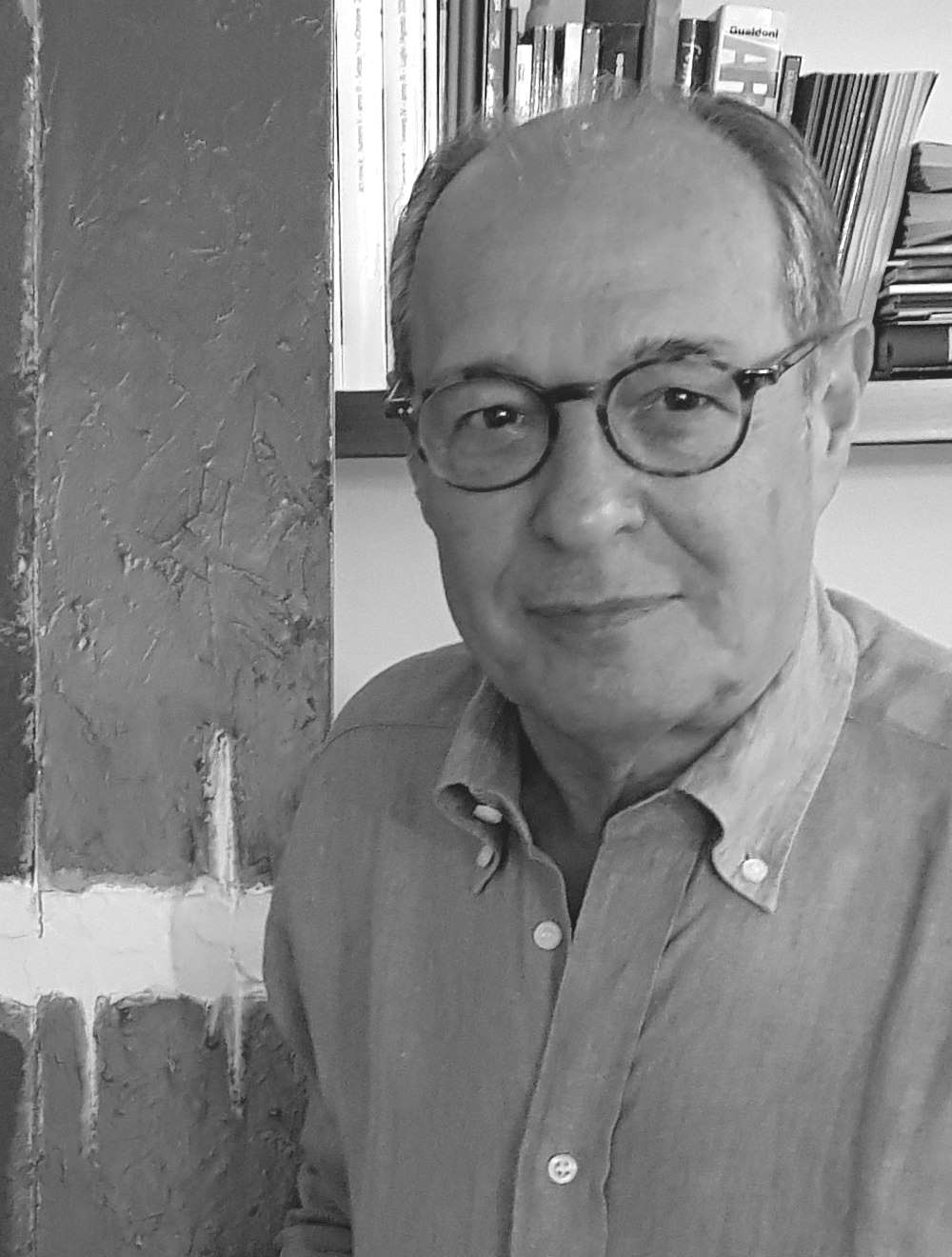
- Born: 28 August 1950 (age 75); Milan, Italy
- Occupation: Painter
- Movement: Contemporary
- Website: https://www.dettoartemoderna.it/

Claudio Detto (born 28 August 1950, in Milan) is an Italian painter of contemporary art.

== Biography ==
Born in Milan on 28 August 1950, Detto felt led towards free drawing from an early age. He grew up as a self-taught painter, and made his debut in the mid-1970s with pictorial tributes dedicated to the great masters of the 20th century, such as Giorgio Morandi, Amedeo Modigliani and Giorgio de Chirico. In the 1990s, he also painted and collected works by important Italian artists. He came to informal art after experimenting with different, more figurative painting styles and after freeing himself from any stylistic scheme or cage, he changed the link with a defined image, and he moved on to informal painting. It expresses an apparently instinctive painting, in continuous research. He has exhibited at the ART 3F exhibitions, Principality of Monaco, curated by Queen Art Studio Gallery, Cairo Editore Art Award, Milan, SaturArte National Contemporary Art Competition in Genova, New York City International Award, curated by Agora Gallery, White Space Chelsea New York, at the International City of Budapest Prize, Budapest Art Expo by the Pinter Gallery, Leonardo da Vinci International Prize, Palazzo Ximenes Panciatichi, Florence. His works are published in Art Now Edizioni Mondadori, in the Catalog of modern art "Italian artists from the early 1900s to today", Edizioni Giorgio Mondadori and in the Atlas of contemporary art Edizioni De Agostini. In 2020 he was included in the Enciclopedia d'arte italiana.

== General sources ==
- Catalog, Artisti 2021, Annuario internazionale d'arte contemporanea, Editore Art Now.ISBN 978-88-943-9707-9
- Monograph, Detto Claudio: arte moderna – looking for emotions, 2019.
- Catalog of Modern Art No. 56, in Giovanni Faccenda, "The Italian Astist from the early twentieth century to today"(Gli Artisti Italiani dal Primo Novecento ad Oggi) Giorgio Mondadori, Milan, 2019.ISBN 978-88-374-1906-6
- Catalog, Atlante dell'Arte Contemporanea, De Agostini editore.ISBN 978-88-511-6880-3
- Catalog, PITTURA BAZART, Collana di Pittura, vol.19, pp. 15,16,17,18,19–26.ISBN 979-12-595-0135-6
- Catalog, L'arte in quarantena, Edizioni Giorgio Mondadori.ISBN 978-88-374-1929-5
- Monograph, L'arte anni 20. Gli anni 20 di ieri, gli anni 20 di oggi, edizione Associazione Nazionale Salvaguardia Belle Arti, 2021.ISBN 978-88-946-2210-2
- Catalog of Modern Art No 57, in Giovanni Faccenda, "The Italian Artist from the early twentieth century to today"(Gli Artisti Italiani dal Primo Novecento ad Oggi), Giorgio Mondadori, Milan, 2021. ISBN 978-88-3741-934-9.
- Monograph, Detto Claudio: Costant Balance, 2022. Editions of Italian Modern and Contemporary Art Archives. ISBN 978-88-946055-9-4
