= Cláudio Silva (footballer) =

Portuguese footballer

Personal information
- Full name: Cláudio Alexandre Gomes Silva
- Date of birth: 9 June 1998 (age 28)
- Place of birth: Ovar, Portugal
- Height: 1.73 m (5 ft 8 in)
- Position: Striker

Youth career
- 2008–2009: Sanjoanense
- 2009–2013: Avanca
- 2013–2017: Oliveirense

Senior career*
Years	Team	Apps	(Gls)
2017–2021	Oliveirense	1	(0)
2018	→ Freamunde (loan)	9	(1)
2018	→ Sertanense (loan)	7	(1)
2019	→ Carregosense (loan)	18	(6)
2019–2020	→ Cesarense (loan)	21	(7)
2020–2021	→ Gondomar (loan)	7	(0)
2021–2022	Estarreja	32	(4)
2022	Paivense	0	(0)
- * Club domestic league appearances and goals as of 15:00, 26 December 2023 (UTC)

Cláudio Alexandre Gomes Silva (born 9 June 1998) is a Portuguese footballer who plays as a striker.

== Career ==
Siva was born in Ovar. On 10 October 2017, he made his professional debut with Oliveirense in a 2017–18 Taça da Liga match against Moreirense.
