= Claudio Matteini =

Italian footballer (1923-2003)

Personal information
- Date of birth: May 31, 1923
- Place of birth: Rome, Italy
- Date of death: January 18, 2003 (aged 79)
- Place of death: Rome, Italy
- Position: Midfielder

Senior career*
Years	Team	Apps	(Gls)
1942–1947	Roma	81	(0)
1947–1949	Ternana	20	(1)
- * Club domestic league appearances and goals

Claudio Matteini (May 31, 1923 – January 18, 2003) was an Italian professional football player.

He played for 2 seasons (29 games, no goals) in the Serie A for A.S. Roma.
