= Claudio Silveira Silva =

Uruguayan artist, writer and sculptor

Claudio Silveira Silva (1939–2007) was a Uruguayan artist, writer and sculptor.

== Life ==
Silva had a Brazilian father and a Uruguayan mother. He spent his early life in Montevideo, where his family had moved after his birth. He studied painting and etching at the National School of Fine Arts, and earned a scholarship in Paris to the Ecole Supérieure des Beaux-Arts for exhibiting his printing abilities in the city. From 1974 until his death in 2007, he took up wood sculpting in a range of ductility. He taught drawing classes and ran a plastic sculpting workshop in Durazno, Uruguay.

== Notable work ==
=== Art ===
- San Ramón Nonato - Nuestra Señora del Luján and Santa Isabel de Cardona Church, Soriano. Made with wood and metal inlays.
- Untitled Statue of Christ - San Pedro de Durazno Church, Durazno.

=== Literature ===
- El gato: Cuento en grabado madera - with Mario Arregui, 1967
- Yunta brava - with Julio C. da Rosa, 1990
- D'Uruguai a Mataró - in collaboration with the Mataró Museum, 1999
- Nuestro campo: en dos visiones - with Raúl Iturria, 2007
