= Claudio Ciccia =

Uruguayan footballer (born 1972)

Personal information
- Full name: Claudio Fabian Ciccia Ourdin
- Date of birth: 11 April 1972 (age 54)
- Place of birth: Montevideo, Uruguay
- Height: 1.84 m (6 ft 1/2 in)
- Position: Forward

Senior career*
Years	Team	Apps	(Gls)
1993–1996	Liverpool		
1996	Alianza		
1998	Deportivo Municipal		
1999	Deportivo Maldonado		
1999–2000	Municipal Puntarenas	16	(5)
2000–2002	Alajuelense	37	(14)
2002–2004	Cartaginés		
2004	Real España		
2005	Cartaginés		
2005	Juventud de Las Piedras		
2006	Chioggia		
2007	Burjassot		

Managerial career
- 2014: Cartaginés
- 2015: Cartaginés
- * Club domestic league appearances and goals

Claudio Fabian Ciccia Ourdin (born 11 April 1972) is a former Uruguay football player who played for Alajuelense and Cartaginés in the Costa Rican Primera Division.

== Playing career ==
=== Club ===
He made his debut in Costa Rican Primera División back in 1999 with Municipal Puntarenas, he soon become part of the usuals at the starting line-up and one of the most claimed players, so he was transferred a few months later to one of the two most important teams in that country.

Ciccia shares the record for most goals scored in the Costa Rican Primera, notching 41 goals for Cartaginés during the 2002–03 season.

== Managerial career ==
After retiring, Ciccia became sports director at Cartaginés and became caretaker manager in 2014 after Javier Delgado quit. He later replaced Enrique Meza jr. at the helm in March 2015.

== Personal life ==
Ciccia is married to Fabiana and they have three children.
