= Claudinho (footballer, born 1980) =

Brazilian footballer

Cláudio
Personal information
- Full name: Cláudio Roberto Siqueira Fernandes Filho
- Date of birth: 21 June 1980 (age 46)
- Place of birth: Londrina, Brazil
- Height: 1.80 m (5 ft 11 in)
- Position: Right back

Team information
- Current team: Brasil de Pelotas

Senior career*
Years	Team	Apps	(Gls)
2001	Goiás		
2001–2005	Iraty		
2004	→ Paraná (loan)	21	(0)
2005	→ Inter de Limeira (loan)	0	(0)
2005	→ Paysandu (loan)	6	(0)
2005	→ Prudentópolis (loan)	0	(0)
2006	CSA	0	(0)
2006	Ituiutaba	11	(1)
2006–2009	Atlético Mineiro	14	(0)
2008	→ Atlético Goianiense (loan)		
2009	→ Ipatinga (loan)		
2010	ABC	0	(0)
2010	Ituiutaba		
2011	América-SP		
2011–	Brasil de Pelotas		
- * Club domestic league appearances and goals

Cláudio Roberto Siqueira Fernandes Filho (born 21 June 1980), or simply Cláudio, is a Brazilian footballer.

== Biography ==
Born in Londrina, Paraná, Cláudio played once for Goiás in 2001 Copa do Brasil. In November 2001 he signed a 5-year contract with Iraty. He played for the team at 2003 Copa do Brasil. In 2004, he was loaned to Paraná and played 21 matches in 2004 Campeonato Brasileiro Série A.

In January 2005 he left for Inter de Limeira, signed a contract until the end of 2005 Campeonato Paulista, which the club relegated. In May, he was loaned to Paysandu but only played 6 league matches. In September, he was loaned to Prudentópolis of Campeonato Paranaense Série Prata (Paraná state 2nd level).

In December 2005 he left for CSA, signed a contract until the end of 2006 Campeonato Alagoano. In July, he was signed by Ituiutaba, league rival of CSA in 2006 Campeonato Brasileiro Série C. He played 11 out of possible 12 matches, scored once.

In September 2006 he was signed by Atlético Mineiro, at first contracted until the end of season. He played 6 matches in national second level, half of them were one of the starting XI. After winning 2006 Campeonato Brasileiro Série B, he extended his contract until the end of 2007 Campeonato Mineiro, and extended again in June, signed a new 3-year deal.

In August 2008 he was loaned to Atlético Goianiense.

== Honours ==
- Campeonato Brasileiro Série B: 2006
- Campeonato Brasileiro Série C: 2008
