= Claude (given name) =

- Pronunciation: /klod/
- Gender: Male (in English), Unisex (in French)

Origin
- Origin: French, via Latin
- Meaning: Latin: "Crippled", "Lame"
- Region of origin: France

Other names
- Related names: Claudius, Claudia, Claudie, Claudio, Claudette, Claudine, Claud

Claude is a Roman given name originating from the Latin name Claudius meaning "crippled" or "lame". In Latin-origin nations, it is used for both men and women, though more common for men. Whereas in English-speaking nations, it is mostly used for men, and is an uncommon given name for women or a family name.

== People ==
- Claude, Duke of Aumale (1526–1573)
- Claude, Duke of Guise (1496–1550)
- Claude de la Colombière (1641–1682), Christian saint
- Claude Lamoral, 3rd Prince of Ligne (1618–1679), Spanish general and prince
- Claude Matthieu, Count Gardane (1766–1818), French general and diplomat
- Claude of Besançon (c. 607–696 or 699), Christian saint, priest, monk, abbot and bishop
- Claude Abadie (1920–2020), French clarinetist
- Claude Abbes (1927–2008), French association football player
- Claude Abravanel (1924–2012), Swiss pianist and composer
- Claude Abromont, French musicologist, essayist and writer
- Claude Adam (born 1958), Luxembourgish politician
- Claude Adelen (born 1944), French poet and literary critic
- Claude Ake (1939–1996), Nigerian political scientist
- Claude Akins (1926–1994), American actor
- Claude Albright (1873–1923), American opera singer
- Claude Allègre (born 1937), French politician and geochemist
- Claude Henry Allen, American lawyer and politician
- Claude Allen (born 1960), American attorney
- Claude Alphandéry (1922–2024), French resistance member, banker and economist
- Claude Alvares, Indian environmentalist
- Claude Alward Ridley (1896–1942), British aviator and military officer
- Claude Améganvi, Togolese politician and Trotskyist
- Claude Anelka (born 1968), French football manager
- Claude Antoine, comte Prieur-Duvernois (1763–1832), French engineer and politician
- Claude Antoine de Valdec de Lessart (1741–1792), French politician
- Claude Arabo (1937–2013), French fencer
- Claude Arnaiz (1931–2009), French boxer
- Claude Arnaud (born 1955), French writer, essayist and biographer
- Claude Arnold (1924–2016), American gridiron football player
- Claude Arnulphy (1697–1786), French painter
- Claude Arpels, American film producer
- Claude Arpi, French writer, historian and Tibetologist
- Claude Arribas (born 1951), French footballer
- Claude Arrieu (1903–1990), French composer
- Claude Aru (born 1997), Ni-Vanuatuan footballer
- Claude Ashton (1901–1942), English footballer and cricketer
- Claude Askolovitch (born 1962), French journalist and author
- Claude Aubery, French physician and philosopher
- Claude Aubry (1914–1984), Canadian library administrator and writer
- Claude Auchinleck (1884–1981), British Field Marshal
- Claude Auclair (1943–1990), French cartoonist
- Claude Audran III (1658–1734), French painter
- Claude Auger (1951–2006), Canadian surgeon general
- Claude Autant-Lara (1901–2000), French film director
- Claude Aveline (1901–1992), French writer
- Claude Azéma (1943–2021), French priest
- Claude Babé, Gabonese footballer
- Claude Bachand (born 1951), Canadian politician
- Claude Bachand (MNA) (born 1956), Canadian politician
- Claude Bakadal (born 1976), French footballer
- Claude Baker (born 1948), American composer
- Claude I. Bakewell (1912–1987), American politician
- Claude Balbastre (1724–1799), French composer
- Claude Ballif (1924–2004), French composer
- Claude Ballot-Léna (1936–1999), French racing driver
- Claude Balon (1671–1744), French dancer and choreographer
- Claude Barker (1897–1961), Australian politician
- Claude Barma (1918–1992), French director
- Claude Barmier (born 1933), French cyclist
- Claude Barnard (1890–1957), Australian politician
- Claude Barnes, American civil-rights campaigner and professor
- Claude Albert Barnett (1889–1967), American journalist
- Claude Barrabé (born 1966), French footballer
- Claude Barras (born 1973), Swiss director
- Claude Barrat (1658–1711), Canadian notary and court clerk
- Claude Barrès (1925–1959), French officer
- Claude Barrett (1907–1976), English footballer
- Claude Barthélemy (footballer) (1945–2020), Haitian footballer
- Claude Barthélemy (musician) (born 1956), French jazz guitarist
- Claude Bartlett (1897–1972), British trade union leader
- Claude Bartolone (born 1951), Tunisian-born French politician
- Claude Barzotti (1953–2023), Belgian singer
- Claude Basire (1764–1794), French revolutionary politician
- Claude Batchelor (born 1929), American soldier convicted of collaboration
- Claude Bateman-Champain (1875–1956), English cricketer
- Claude Batho (1935–1981), French photographer
- Claude Baudoux (1898–1984), Belgian field hockey player
- Claude Baumann, Swiss chess player
- Claude Bautista, Filipino politician
- Claude Baux (born 1945), French retired slalom canoeist
- Claude Bazin de Bezons (1617–1684), French lawyer and politician
- Claude Beales (1887–1963), Australian rules footballer
- Claude Beauchamp (1939–2020), Canadian journalist
- Claude Beausoleil (1948–2020), Canadian poet and writer
- Claude Bébéar (1935–2025), French businessman
- Claude Béchard (1969–2010), Canadian politician
- Claude Beck (1894–1971), American cardiac surgeon and professor of cardiovascular surgery
- Claude de Bectoz (1490–1547), writer, intellectual, abbess and correspondent of Francis I of France
- Claude Belot (born 1936), French politician
- Claude Bénard (1926–2025), French high jumper
- Claude Bennett (1936–2020), Canadian politician
- Claude Berge (1926–2002), French mathematician
- Claude Bergeaud (born 1960), French basketball coach
- Claude Berger (1679–1712), French doctor and chemist
- Claude Bergeret (born 1954), French table tennis player
- Claude Lucien Bergery (1787–1863), French economist
- Claude Bernard (1813–1878), French physiologist
- Claude Berrou (born 1951), French professor in electrical engineering
- Claude Berri (1934–2009), French film director
- Claude Berry (1880–1974), American baseball player
- Claude Bertin (1653–1705), French artist
- Claude Berton (1903–1993), American racing driver
- Claude Bertrand (disambiguation), several people
- Claude Bessy (dancer) (1932–2026), French ballerina
- Claude Bice (1879–1953), American football coach
- Claude Billard (1550–1618), French writer, poet and playwright
- Claude Binyon (1905–1978), American film director
- Claude Birkett Ferenbaugh (1899–1975), United States Army General
- Claude Birraux (born 1946), French politician
- Claude Bissell (1916–2000), Canadian historian
- Claude Biwer (born 1936), French politician
- Claude Bizibuye Nyamugabo, Congolese politician
- Claude Black, several people
- Claude Blagden (1874–1952), Anglican bishop
- Claude le Blanc (1669–1728), French Royal official
- Claude Blanchard (1932–2006), Canadian actor and singer
- Claude Blanchard (ice hockey) (1945–2019), French ice hockey player
- Claude C. Bloch (1878–1967), United States Navy admiral
- Claude Bloch (1923–1971), French theoretical nuclear physicist
- Claude Bloodgood (1937–2001), American chess player
- Claude Bodin (born 1952), French politician
- Claude Boileau (born 1933), Canadian ice hockey player
- Claude Victor de Boissieu (1784–1868), French painter
- Claude Boissol (1920–2016), French film director and screenwriter
- Claude Boivin (born 1970), Canadian ice hockey player
- Claude Bolling (1930–2020), French jazz pianist and composer
- Claude M. Bolton Jr. (1945–2015), United States Air Force general
- Claude Bonin-Pissarro (1921–2021), French painter and graphic designer
- Claude Borelli (1934–1960), French actress
- Claude Bosi, Michelin-starred chef
- Claude Bouchard (born 1939), Canadian researcher
- Claude Boucher (disambiguation), several people
- Claude Bouchiat (1932–2021), French physicist
- Claude Bouhier de Lantenay (1681–1755), French clergyman
- Claude Bourdet (1909–1996), French politician and writer
- Claude Bourgelat (1712–1779), French veterinary surgeon
- Claude Bourquard (born 1937), French fencer
- Claude Bourque (1915–1982), Canadian ice hockey player
- Claude Bourrigault (1932–2021), French footballer
- Claude Bouton, Lord of Corbaron
- Claude Bouxin (1907–1997), French art director
- Claude G. Bowers (1878–1958), American journalist and politician
- Claude Bowes-Lyon, several people
- Claude Bracey (1909–1940), American sprinter
- Claude Brami (born 1948), French writer
- Claude Brasseur (1936–2020), French actor
- Claude A. Bray Jr. (1931–2020), American politician
- Claude Bréart de Boisanger (1899–1999), French diplomat
- Claude Breeze (born 1938), Canadian painter
- Claude Bremond (1929–2021), French semiologist
- Claude Brinegar (1926–2009), American government official
- Claude Brixhe (1933–2021), French linguist
- Claude Brossette (1671–1743), French lawyer and writer
- Claude Brown (1937–2002), American writer
- Claude Brumachon (born 1959), French choreographer
- Claude Buchon (born 1949), French cyclist
- Claude Buckenham (1876–1937), English cricketer and footballer
- Claude Buckle (1905–1973), mid-20th-century English painter
- Claude Buckle (Royal Navy officer, born 1803) (1803–1894), English naval officer
- Claude Buckle (Royal Navy officer, born 1839) (1839–1930), Royal navy officer
- Claude Buffet (1933–1972), French criminal
- Claude Buffier (1661–1737), French philosopher, historian and teacher
- Claude Burdin (1788–1873), French engineer
- Claude Buridant (born 1938), French linguist
- Claude A. Buss (1903–1998), American historian
- Claude Cadart (1927–2019), French Sinologist
- Claude E. Cady (1878–1953), American politician
- Claude Cahen (1909–1991), French Marxist orientalist and historian
- Claude Cahun (1894–1954), French surrealist photographer, sculptor and writer
- Claude Callegari (1962–2021), English football supporter
- Claude Ewen Cameron (1894–1982), Australian Army officer
- Claude Campos, Brazilian footballer
- Claude Canaway (1911–1989), Australian rules footballer
- Claude R. Canizares, American physicist
- Claude Cardin (born 1941), Canadian former ice hockey left winger
- Claude Carignan (born 1964), Canadian politician
- Claude Cariguel, French writer
- Claude Carliez (1925–2015), French stunt performer
- Claude Carlin (born 1961), French cyclist
- Claude Carmona (born 1964), French gymnast
- Claude E. Carpenter (1904–1976), American set decorator
- Claude Carter (1881–1952), South African cricketer
- Claude Castonguay (1929–2020), Canadian politician
- Claude Céberet du Boullay (1647–1702), French diplomat
- Claude Cerval (1921–1972), French actor
- Claude Chabauty (1910–1990), French mathematician
- Claude Chabrol (1930–2010), French film director
- Claude Chagnon (born 1948), Canadian ice hockey player
- Claude Chalhoub (born 1974), Lebanese musical artist
- Claude William Chambers (1861–1947), Australian architect
- Claude Humbert Piarron de Chamousset (1717–1773), French physician
- Claude Champagne (1891–1965), French Canadian composer, teacher, pianist and violinist
- Claude Champion de Crespigny (1873–1910), British soldier and polo player
- Claude Champy, French ceramicist
- Claude Chappe (1763–1805), French inventor
- Claude Chappuys (1500–1575), French poet
- Claude Charles (1661–1747), French painter
- Claude Charron (born 1946), Canadian politician
- Claude Chartre (born 1949), Canadian ice hockey player
- Claude Chauchetière (1645–1709), French Jesuit missionary and painter
- Claude Eugène Chauchouart de Lavicomté, French navy officer of the war of American independence
- Claude Chazottes (born 1949), French footballer
- Claude Chevalley (1909–1984), French mathematician
- Claude Chevalley (basketball), Swiss basketball player
- Claude Cheysson (1920–2012), French politician
- Claude Chirac (born 1962), daughter of Jacques Chirac
- Claude Cholat, French painter
- Claude Choules (1901–2011), British WWI veteran and last combat veteran from any nation
- Claude Clark (1915–2001), African American painter
- Claude Clegg, American historian
- Claude Clegg (athlete) (1913–1991), New Zealand javelin thrower
- Claude Clerselier (1614–1684), French lawyer, editor and translator
- Claude Closky (born 1963), French artist
- Claude Clough (1884–1922), Australian rules footballer
- Claude Cloutier (born 1957), Canadian film animator
- Claude Cohen-Tannoudji (1933–2026), French physicist
- Claude Coleman Jr. (born 1974), American drummer
- Claude Colette (1929–1990), French cyclist
- Claude Colleer Abbott (1889–1971), English poet
- Claude Colombo (born 1960), French professional football referee
- Claude Combes (1935–2021), French biologist and parasitologist
- Claude Constantino (1938–2019), Senegalese basketball player
- Claude Corbett (1885–1944), Australian sports journalist
- Claude Corbineau (1772–1807), French general
- Claude Corbitt (1915–1978), American baseball player
- Claude Corbo (born 1945), political scientist
- Claude Corea (1894–1962), Permanent Representative of Sri Lanka to the United Nations from 1958 to 1961
- Claude Cormier (1960–2023), Canadian landscape architect and urban designer
- Claude Cornish (1888–1975), Australian rules footballer
- Claude Couinaud (1922–2008), French surgeon and anatomist
- Claude Courchay (1933–2024), French novelist
- Claude Courtépée (1721–1781), French priest, teacher and historian
- Claude Cousineau (born 1950), Canadian politician and teacher
- Claude Covassi (1970–2013), Swiss criminal and spy
- Claude Crabb (1940–2021), American football player
- Claude Craigie (1886–?), Scottish footballer
- Claude J. Crenshaw, American World War II flying ace
- Claude Crépeau, Canadian computer scientist
- Claude Crétier (born 1977), French alpine skier
- Claude Criquielion (1957–2015), Belgian cyclist
- Claude Crocker (1924–2002), American baseball player
- Claude Croté (1938–2013), Belgian footballer
- Claude Crowl (1892–1915), Australian rules footballer with St Kilda
- Claude Cummings (1917–1965), Australian rules footballer
- Claude Cummings Jr., American labor union leader
- Claude Curtin (1920–1994), Australian rules footballer
- Claude Cuy y Mola (born 1957), French sports shooter
- Claude Cymerman (born 1947), French classical pianist
- Claude Cyr (1939–1971), Canadian ice hockey player
- Claude Dablon (1618–1697), Jesuit missionary in Canada
- Claude Dagens (born 1940), French prelate
- Claude Dalenberg (1927–2008), zen priest
- Claude Dallaire (born 1960), Canadian weightlifter
- Claude Dallas (born 1950), self-styled "Mountain Man" and convicted murderer of two U.S. game wardens
- Claude Dallemagne (1754–1813), French general
- Claude Damas Ozimo (born 1939), Gabonese politician
- Claude Dambreville, Haitian writer and painter
- Claude Dambury (born 1971), French Guianan footballer
- Claude Dampier (1878–1955), British actor
- Claude d'Anna (born 1945), French film director
- Claude Darbos (1936–2016), French rugby union player
- Claude Darciaux (born 1942), French politician
- Claude Dasse (born 1964), French bobsledder
- Claude Dauphin (disambiguation), several people
- Claude Dausque (1566–1644), French Jesuit
- Claude Davenport (1898–1976), American baseball player
- Claude Davey (1908–2001), Wales international rugby union player
- Claude Davidson (1896–1956), American baseball player
- Claude Davis (born 1979), Jamaican footballer
- Claude Davis (American football) (born 1989), American football player
- Claude DeBellefeuille (born 1963), Canadian politician
- Claude Debru (born 1944), French philosopher
- Claude DeBruhl, American politician
- Claude Debussy (1862–1918), French composer
- Claude Dehombreux (1939–2010), Belgian rower
- Claude Dejoux (1732–1816), French sculptor
- Claude Delacroix, Belgian musician and radio presenter
- Claude Alphonse Delangle (1797–1869), French magistrate, politician and lawyer
- Claude Delangle (born 1957), French classical saxophonist
- Claude Delbeke, Belgian civil engineer and philatelist
- Claude Delisle (1644–1720), French cartographer
- Claude Dellacherie, French mathematician
- Claude Delvincourt (1888–1954), French composer
- Claude Demassieux (born 1946), French politician
- Claude Demetrius (1916–1988), African-American songwriter
- Claude Dempsey, New Zealand rugby league footballer
- Claude Denman (1896–1958), Australian rules footballer
- Claude Deppa (born 1958), South African jazz trumpeter
- Claude Desailly (1922–2009), French screenwriter
- Claude Desbons (1938–2001), French politician
- Claude Deschiens, French slave trader and privateer
- Claude André Deseine (1740–1823), French sculptor
- Claude Desouches (1911–2001), French sailor
- Claude Desusclade (1919–2015), French swimmer
- Claude P. Dettloff (1899–1978), American photographer
- Claude Dielna (born 1987), French professional footballer
- Claude Dilain (1948–2015), French politician
- Claude Disney-Roebuck (1876–1947), English cricketer, British Army officer and actor
- Claude Dolbert (1902–1967), French film producer
- Claude Ernest Dolman (1906–1994), Canadian academic and microbiologist
- Claude Domeizel (born 1940), French politician
- Claude Joseph Dorat (1734–1780), French writer
- Claude Dornier (1884–1969), German aircraft designer
- Claude Doumet-Serhal, Lebanese archaeologist
- Claude Dourthe (born 1948), French rugby union player
- Claude Drouin (born 1956), Canadian politician
- Claude Du Bosc (1682–1746), French-born English engraver
- Claude Dubaële (born 1940), French footballer and coach
- Claude Dubar (1945–2015), French sociologist
- Claude Dubois (born 1947), Canadian musical artist
- Claude Dubois (politician) (born 1931), Canadian politician
- Claude Marie Dubuis (1817–1895), French-born prelate
- Claude Dufau (1946–2021), French rugby player and manager
- Claude Duflos (1665–1727), French engraver
- Claude Dufourmentel (1915–2012), French plastic surgeon
- Claude Dugardin (born 1938), French field hockey player
- Claude Dunbar (1909–1971), British Army general
- Claude Duplain (born 1954), Canadian politician
- Claude Dupuy, several people
- Claude Durand (1938–2015), French publisher, translator and writer
- Claude Duval, (1643–1670), French-born gentleman highwayman in post-Restoration Britain
- Claude Eatherly (1918–1978), United States Army Air Forces officer
- Claude Ecken, French science fiction writer
- Claude Wilbur Edgerton (1880–1965), American mycologist
- Claude Edorh (born 1972), German hurdler
- Claude Elliott (disambiguation), several people
- Claude Ely (1922–1978), American musical artist
- Claude Engle (1938–2023), American electrical engineer
- Claude English (born 1946), American basketball player and coach
- Claude Érignac (1937–1998), French politician
- Claude Esteban (1935–2006), French poet
- Claude Estier (1925–2016), French politician and journalist
- Claude Evans (1933–1982), Canadian ice hockey player
- Claude Évin (born 1949), French politician and lawyer
- Claude Evrard (1933–2020), French actor
- Claude Ewing Rusk (1871–1931), American mountaineer and lawyer
- Claude Ezoua (born 1956), French-born Ivorian rugby union footballer and coach
- Claude Fabre (born 1951), French physicist
- Claude Fagedet (1928–2017), French photographer
- Claude Falkiner, player of English billiards
- Claude Faraggi (1942–1991), French novelist
- Claude Faraldo (1936–2008), French actor, director and screenwriter
- Claude Farell (1914–2008), Austrian actress
- Claude Farrer (1864–1890), English tennis player
- Claude Farrère (1876–1957), French navy officer and writer
- Claude Fauchet (disambiguation), several people
- Claude Charles Fauriel (1772–1844), French historian, philologist and critic
- Claude Favre de Vaugelas (1585–1650), Savoyard grammarian and man of letters
- Claude Fayette Bragdon (1866–1946), American architect
- Claude Feemster Clayton (1909–1969), American judge
- Claude Feidt (1936–2020), French bishop
- Claude Feige (born 1958), French curler
- Claude Fell (1892–1972), Australian rules footballer
- Claude Felstead (1889–1964), Australian amateur golfer
- Claude Fenner (1916–1978), First Inspector-General of Police of Malaysia
- Claude Eric Fergusson McKay (1878–1972), Australian journalist and publicist of Scottish descent
- Claude Ferragne (born 1952), Canadian high jumper
- Claude Ferrier (1879–1935), Scottish architect
- Claude Fichaux (born 1969), French footballer
- Claude Fiocca (1931–2001), American politician
- Claude S. Fischer (born 1948), American sociologist
- Claude Fischler, French social scientist
- Claude Flagel (1932–2020), French musician
- Claude Flahault (1923–2015), French sailor
- Claude Fleck (1889–1962), Australian politician
- Claude Flemming (1884–1952), Australian actor, writer, producer and director
- Claude Fleury (1640–1723), French priest, jurist and ecclesiastical historian
- Claude Flight (1881–1955), British artist
- Claude Floquet (1884–1963), South African cricketer
- Claude Fonnereau (1677–1740), French Huguenot refugee
- Claude Forget (born 1936), Canadian economist and politician
- Claude Fournier (disambiguation), several people
- Claude Foussier (1925–2010), French sports shooter
- Claude of France (1499–1524), queen consort of King Francis I of France and Duchess of Brittany
- Claude of France (1547–1575), second daughter of King Henry II of France and Catherine de' Medici
- Claude François (1939–1978), French musician
- Claude François de Malet (1754–1812), French aristocrat and soldier
- Claude Fredericks (1923–2013), American poet and playwright
- Claude Fuess (1885–1963), American educator, administrator and biographer
- Claude Fuller, several people
- Claude Gagnon (born 1949), Canadian film director
- Claude Gaillard (born 1944), French politician
- Claude Ferdinand Gaillard (1834–1887), French engraver and painter
- Claude Gallimard (1914–1991), French publisher
- Claude Galopin, French automotive engineer
- Claude Garache (1929–2023), French artist
- Claude Garamond (1499–1561), French publisher and type designer
- Claude Gasnal (1949–2025), French basketball player
- Claude Gaspar Bachet de Méziriac (1581–1638), French mathematician
- Claude Gatignol (born 1938), French politician
- Claude Gauthier (disambiguation), several people
- Claude Gauvard (born 1942), French medievalist historian and academic
- Claude Gay (1800–1873), French botanist, naturalist and illustrator
- Claude Ursule Gency (1766–1845), French general
- Claude Genest, Canadian journalist and actor
- Claude Génia (1913–1979), French actress
- Claude Gensac (1927–2016), French actress
- Claude Geoffroy (disambiguation)
- Claude Germany, French musician
- Claude Gibb (1898–1959), South Australian engineer
- Claude "Hoot" Gibson (born 1939), American football player and coach
- Claude Gilbert (1932–2024), American football coach
- Claude Casimir Gillet (1806–1896), French botanist
- Claude Gillingwater (1870–1939), American actor
- Claude Gillot (1673–1722), French painter
- Claude Gingras (1931–2018), Canadian journalist and music critic
- Claude Giraud (1936–2020), French actor
- Claude Giroux (born 1988), French-Canadian professional ice hockey player and alternate captain for the Ottawa Senators
- Claude Giroux (wrestler) (born 1956), Canadian professional wrestler
- Claude de Givray (born 1933), French film director
- Claude Gnapka (born 1983), French footballer
- Claude Goasguen (1945–2020), French politician
- Claude Godard d'Aucour (1716–1795), French writer
- Claude Godard d'Aucourt de Saint-Just (1768–1826), French librettist
- Claude Godart (born 1980), Luxembourgish hurdler
- Claude Goldie (1876–1956), English rower
- Claude Gonçalves (born 1994), Portuguese footballer
- Claude Gordon (1916–1996), American musical artist
- Claude Gordy, American politician
- Claude Goretta (1929–2019), Swiss TV producer and film director
- Claude Goudimel, French composer, music editor and publisher
- Claude Gouffier (1501–1570), French nobleman and book collector
- Claude Charles Goureau (1790–1879), French soldier and entomologist
- Claude Gouzzie (1873–1907), American baseball player
- Claude Grahame-White (1879–1959), English aviator
- Claude Grange (1883–1971), French sculptor
- Claude Gravelle (born 1949), Canadian politician
- Claude Gravereaux (1913–1943), French field hockey player
- Claude Gray (1932–2023), American country music singer-songwriter
- Claude Greder (1934–2005), French water polo player
- Claude Green (1906–1986), South African cricketer
- Claude Gregory (born 1958), American basketball player
- Claude Grégory (1921–2010), French literary critic and editor
- Claude Greff (born 1954), French politician
- Claude Grier (1904–1967), American baseball player
- Claude Gros de Boze (1680–1753), French numismatist
- Claude Gruffat (born 1957), French politician and entrepreneur
- Claude Guay, Canadian politician
- Claude Guéant (born 1945), French civil servant
- Claude Guichard (1928–2021), French politician
- Claude Guigue (1832–1889), French archivist
- Claude Guiguet (born 1947), French modern pentathlete
- Claude Guilhot (1928–1990), French jazz vibraphonist and drummer
- Claude Guillaumin (1842–1927), French painter and caricaturist
- Claude Guillermet de Bérigard (1578–1663), French philosopher
- Claude Guillon (1952–2023), French writer and philosopher
- Claude Guimond (born 1963), Canadian politician
- Claude Guimond de La Touche (1723–1760), French playwright and poet
- Claude Guyot (born 1947), French cyclist
- Claude Haffner (born 1976), French-Congolese filmmaker
- Claude Hagège (born 1936), French linguist
- Claude Haldi (1942–2017), Swiss racing driver
- Claude Hall (1932–2017), American journalist and writer
- Claude Hardy (1604–1678), French linguist, mathematician and lawyer
- Claude Harmon (1916–1989), American professional golfer
- Claude Harriott (born 1981), American gridiron football player
- Claude Harris Jr. (1940–1994), American politician
- Claude L. Harrison (1886–1986), Canadian politician
- Claude Harvey (born 1948), American football player
- Claude Hauet (1925–1995), French field hockey player
- Claude Haut (born 1944), French politician
- Claude Hay (musician), Australian musician
- Claude Hay (Conservative politician) (1862–1920), British politician
- Claude Hayes (1912–1996), British civil servant
- Claude Hayslett, American baseball player
- Claude Heater (1927–2020), American opera singer
- Claude Hêche (born 1952), Swiss politician
- Claude Heim (1912–2002), French long jumper
- Claude Helffer (1922–2004), French pianist
- Claude Adrien Helvétius (1715–1771), French philosopher
- Claude Henderson (born 1972), South African cricketer
- Claude Hendrix (1889–1944), American baseball player
- Claude Herbulot (1908–2006), French entomologist
- C. Nash Herndon (1916–1998), American geneticist
- Claude Heymann (1907–1994), French screenwriter and film director
- Claude W. Hibbard (1905–1973), American paleontologist
- Claude Hickson (1878–1948), New Zealand cricketer
- Claude Hillaire-Marcel (born 1944), Canadian geologist
- Claude M. Hilton (born 1940), American judge
- Claude Hipps (1927–2017), American football player
- Claude Holgate (1872–1937), American wrestler
- Claude Holman (1904–1973), American lawyer and politician
- Claude C. Hopkins (1866–1932), American advertiser and author
- Claude Horan (1917–2014), American artist
- Claude Houben (1926–2009), Belgian bobsledder
- Claude Houde (born 1947), Canadian ice hockey player
- Claude Houghton (1889–1961), British novelist
- Claude Hubert (1914–1977), French racewalker
- Claude Hudelot (1942–2021), French Sinologist
- Claude Hudson (1881–1952), American chemist
- Claude B. Hudspeth (1877–1941), American cowboy, rancher, lawyer and statesman
- Claude Hugot (1929–1978), French chess player
- Claude Hulbert (1900–1964), British comic actor
- Claude Humphrey (1944–2021), American football player and coach
- Claude Hunt, several people
- Claude B. Hutchison (1885–1980), American politician
- Claude Iff (born 1946), Swiss footballer
- Claude Imbert (born 1933), French philosopher and logician
- Claude Issorat (born 1966), French Paralympic athlete
- Claude Itoungue Bongogne (born 2001), Cameroonian sprinter
- Claude Itzykson (1938–1995), French theoretical physicist
- Claude Jade (1948–2006), French actress
- Claude Jaeger (1917–2004), French film producer and film actor
- Claude James (1878–1961), Australian politician
- Claude Jameson (1886–1943), American soccer player
- Claude Jamet (1929–2021), French footballer
- Claude Janiak (born 1948), Swiss politician
- Claude Jarman Jr. (1934–2025), American actor
- Claude Jasmin (1930–2021), Canadian journalist
- Claude J. Jasper, American politician
- Claude Jaupart (born 1953), French geophysicist
- Claude Javeau (1940–2021), Belgian sociologist and professor
- Claude Jean-Prost (1936–2018), French ski jumper
- Claude Jeancolas (1949–2016), French writer, art historian and journalist
- Claude Jeannerot (born 1945), French politician
- Claude Jeantet (1902–1982), French journalist and politician
- Claude Jennings (1884–1950), Australian cricketer
- Claude Jephcott (1890–1950), English professional footballer
- Claude Jeter (1914–2009), American singer
- Claude Jodoin (1913–1975), Canadian trade unionist and politician
- Claude Hermann Walter Johns (1857–1920), British assyriologist
- Claude Joseph Johnson (1913–1990), American gospel singer and preacher
- Claude M. Johnson (1852–1919), American politician
- Claude Johnson (1864–1926), British businessman and managing director of Rolls-Royce Ltd.
- Claude Prosper Jolyot de Crébillon (1707–1777), French novelist
- Claude Jones (1901–1962), American jazz musician
- Claude Jonnard (1897–1959), American baseball player
- Claude Thomas Alexis Jordan (1814–1897), French botanist and taxonomist
- Claude Joseph, Haitian politician and foreign minister
- Claude Julien, several people
- Claude Jutra (1930–1986), Canadian actor, film director and screenwriter
- Claude Kahn (1935–2023), French pianist
- Claude Kalisa (born 1977), Rwandan footballer
- Claude Kelly, American singer and songwriter
- Claude Kévers-Pascalis, Belgian writer, historian and engineer
- Claude Kiambe (born 2003), Congolese-born Dutch singer
- Claude Kietzman (1918–1989), South African rower
- Claude Kinder, several people
- Claude King (1923–2013), American country music singer-songwriter
- Claude King (actor) (1875–1941), English-American actor
- Claude Kirby (1868–1935), English football executive
- Claude Kirchner (1916–1993), American entertainer and announcer
- Claude R. Kirk Jr. (1926–2011), 36th governor of Florida
- Claude Kitchin (1869–1923), American politician
- Claude Klee (1931–2017), French biochemist
- Claude Kogan (1919–1959), French mountain climber
- Claude Kohler (1931–2019), American sailor
- Claude Kory Kondiano (1942–2022), Guinean politician
- Claude Koutob (born 1995), Togolese footballer
- Claude La Colombière (1641–1682), French Jesuit priest and saint
- Claude La Haye, Canadian production sound mixer
- Claude LaBrosse (born 1934), Canadian ice hockey player
- Claude Lacaze (1940–2026), French international rugby union and rugby league footballer
- Claude Lachance (born 1945), Canadian politician
- Claude Lacroix (1944–2021), French screenwriter and comic book author
- Claude LaForge (1936–2015), Canadian ice hockey player
- Claude Lafortune (1936–2020), Canadian paper artist
- Claude Lagarde (1895–1983), French sports shooter
- Claude Lajoie (1928–2015), Canadian politician
- Claude R. Lakey (1910–1990), American jazz musician
- Claude Lambert (born 1969), Canadian boxer
- Claude Lambie (1868–1921), Scottish footballer
- Claude Lamirault (1918–1945), French military officer
- Claude Lamour (born 1969), French cyclist
- Claude Lamoureux (1650–1699), French sculptor
- Claude Lamy, Canadian swimmer
- Claude Lancaster (1899–1977), British soldier, politician and businessman
- Claude Landini (1926–2021), Swiss basketball player
- Claude Landry (born 1955), Canadian politician
- Claude Langlois, French scientific instrument maker
- Claude Lanthier (1933–2015), Canadian politician
- Claude Lanzmann (1925–2018), French journalist and film director
- Claude Lapointe (born 1968), Canadian former ice hockey player
- Claude A. Larkin (1891–1969), American Marine general
- Claude Larochelle (1931–2002), Canadian hockey journalist
- Claude Larose, several people
- Claude Lastennet (born 1971), French serial killer
- Claude Laurgeau (born 1942), French engineer
- Claude Laverdure (author) (1947–2020), Belgian comics artist
- Claude Lavoie Richer (1929–2014), Canadian cross-country skier
- Claude Laydu (1927–2011), Swiss actor
- Claude Le Baube (1919–2007), French painter
- Claude Le Ber (1931–2016), French cyclist
- Claude Le Coz (1740–1815), French catholic bishop
- Claude Le Jeune (1530–1600), Franco-Flemish composer
- Claude Le Pen (1948–2020), French economist
- Claude Le Péron (1948–2020), French musician
- Claude Le Roy (born 1948), French association football player and manager
- Claude Lebey (1923–2017), French food critic and publisher
- Claude LeBrun (born 1956), American mathematician
- Claude Lechatellier (born 1946), French cyclist
- Claude Lecomte (1817–1871), French general
- Claude Lecourbe (1759–1815), French general
- Claude Lecouteux (born 1943), French philologist
- Claude L'Écuyer (born 1947), Canadian politician
- Claude Ledoux (composer) (born 1960), Belgian composer
- Claude Nicolas Ledoux (1736–1806), French neoclassical architect
- Claude Lefebvre, several people
- Claude Joachim Lefèvre, French racehorse owner
- Claude Lefort (1924–2010), French philosopher
- Claude Legault (born 1963), Canadian actor and TV writer
- Claude Juste Alexandre Legrand (1762–1815), French general
- Claude Legrand (skier) (born 1941), French cross-country skier
- Claude Legris (born 1956), Canadian ice hockey player
- Claude Lelouch (born 1937), French filmmaker and writer
- Claude Lemaréchal, French applied mathematician
- Claude Lemieux (1965–2026), Canadian ice hockey player
- Claude Lemoine (born 1932), French chess player
- Claude Lenners (born 1956), Luxembourgish composer
- Claude Lepelley (1934–2015), French historian
- Claude Leroy (field hockey) (1935–2004), French field hockey player
- Claude Leteurtre (born 1940), French politician
- Claude Léveillée, French musical artist
- Claude B. Levenson (1938–2010), French journalist and writer
- Claude Lévi-Strauss (1908–2009), French anthropologist
- Claude Lewis (1908–1993), English cricketer
- Claude Liauzu (1940–2007), French historian
- Claude Lightfoot (1910–1991), American politician
- C. H. Lindsley (1894–1969), American architect
- Claude List, rugby league player
- Claude Littner (born 1949), British businessman
- Claude Lobo (1943–2011), automotive designer
- Claude Loiselle (born 1963), Canadian ice hockey player
- Claude Lombard (1945–2021), Belgian singer
- Claude Lorius (1932–2023), French glaciologist
- Claude Lorrain (c. 1600–1682), French landscape painter, draughtsman and etcher traditionally called just "Claude" in English
- Claude Louis Berthollet (1748–1822), French chemist
- Claude Louis, Comte de Saint-Germain (1707–1778), French general
- Claude Lowitz (born 1962), French football player and manager
- Claude Lowther (1870–1929), British politician
- Claude Loyola Allgen (1920–1990), Swedish composer
- Claude Lucas (born 1943), French writer
- Claude Luse (1879–1932), American lawyer and United States District Judge for the Western District of Wisconsin
- Claude Luter (1923–2006), musical artist
- Claude Lutz (1942–2022), French retired slalom canoeist
- Claude Maxwell MacDonald (1852–1915), British army officer and diplomat
- Claude Mackay (1894–1915), Indian-born English cricketer
- Claude Maddox (1897–1958), Chicago mobster
- Claude Magnay (1819–1870), English clergyman and cricketer
- Claude Magni (born 1950), French cyclist
- Claude Maka Kum (born 1985), footballer
- Claude Makélélé (born 1973), French football manager and former player
- Claude Mallet, British diplomat
- Claude de Malleville (1597–1647), French poet
- Claude Mandil (born 1942), French businessman
- Claude Mandonnaud (born 1950), French swimmer
- Claude Mandy (1908–1978), South African cricketer
- Claude Mantoulan (1936–1983), former French dual-code international rugby footballer
- Claude Marcel, French diplomat, language teacher and applied linguist
- Claude Marcil (born 1963), Canadian fencer
- Claude Mariétan (born 1953), Swiss footballer
- Claude Marin (1931–2001), French cartoonist
- Claude Marin de la Perrière (1705–1752), Canadian fur trader
- Claude Marquet (1869–1920), Australian political cartoonist
- Claude Martin (1735–1800), French soldier
- Claude Martin (rower) (1930–2017), French rower
- Claude Massey (1889–1968), Australian public servant and diplomat
- Claude Massop (1949–1979), gang leader
- Claude Matthews (1845–1898), American politician
- Claude Matthews (Australian politician) (1899–1954), Australian politician
- Claude Mattio (born 1936), French cyclist
- Claude Mattocks (born 1980), footballer
- Claude Maurer (born 1975), Swiss sailor
- Claude Mauriac (1914–1996), French author and journalist
- Claude May (1913–2009), French actress
- Claude C. McColloch (1888–1959), American politician and judge
- Claude McFayden (died 1947), Australian rugby league footballer and administrator
- Claude McKay (1889–1948), Jamaican writer and poet
- Claude McKenzie, Canadian singer-songwriter
- Claude C. McRaven (1918–2007), American football player
- Claude Meillassoux (1925–2005), French neo-Marxist economic anthropologist and Africanist
- Claude Meisch (born 1971), Luxembourgish politician
- Claude Mélançon (1895–1973), French Canadian naturalist, journalist and author
- Claude Melki (1939–1994), French actor
- Claude Mellan (1598–1688), French engraver and painter
- Claude Melnot Wilson (1898–1918), Canadian World War I flying ace
- Claude Ménard, several people
- Claude Mercier-Ythier (1931–2020), French harpsichord manufacturer
- Claude Mérelle (1888–1976), French actress
- Claude Ignace François Michaud (1751–1835), French soldier
- Claude Michel (1738–1814), French sculptor
- Claude Michel (footballer) (born 1971), French footballer
- Claude Michel (politician) (born 1938), French politician
- Claude Michelet (1938–2022), French writer
- Claude Michely (1959–2023), Luxembourgish cyclist
- Claude Michy (born 1949), French sports executive
- Claude Migeon (1923–2018), French pediatric endocrinologist
- Claude Miller (baseball), American baseball player
- Claude Miller (bishop) (1944–2023), Canadian Anglican bishop
- Claude Mithon de Genouilly (1725–1803), French navy officer of the war of American Independence
- Claude or Claudia Moatti (born 1954), French historian specialising in Roman Studies
- Claude Mobitang (born 1987), Cameroonian footballer
- Claude Moët (1683–1760), French winemaker and wine merchant
- Claude Moisy (1927–2020), French journalist
- Claude Mollet (1564–1649), French gardener and astrologer
- Claude Monet (1840–1926), French painter
- Claude Mongeau, Canadian railroad executive
- Claude Moniquet (born 1958), French journalist
- Claude Montal (1800–1865), French piano tuner and piano maker
- Claude Montana (1947–2024), French fashion designer
- Claude Montefiore (1858–1938), British Jewish religious leader and scholar
- Claude Monteux (1920–2013), American flutist and conductor
- Claude Montmarquette (1942–2021), Canadian economist
- Claude Moore (1875–1928), British army officer
- Claude Moraes (born 1965), British labor politician and campaigner
- Claude Moreau (born 1958), French cyclist
- Claude Morin, several people
- Claude Morinière (born 1960), French long jumper
- Claude F. Morris (1869–1957), Justice of the Montana Supreme Court
- Claude Mossé (1924–2022), French historian
- Claude Mouriéras (born 1953), French film director
- Claude Mourthé (1932–2024), French writer and film director
- Claude Mulcahy, South African cricketer and South African Army officer
- Claude Mulot (1942–1986), French screenwriter and film director
- Claude Mutafian (born 1942), French writer, historian and mathematician
- Claude Myburgh (1911–1987), English cricketer and British Army officer
- Claude Mydorge (1585–1647), French mathematician
- Claude Mylon (1618–1660), French mathematician
- Claude N'Goran (born 1975), Ivorian tennis player
- Claude H. Nash, American biochemist
- Claude Netter (1924–2007), French Olympic champion foil fencer
- Claude Neveu (1931–2007), French slalom canoeist
- Claude Newberry (1888–1916), South African cricketer
- Claude Newman, British ballet dancer
- Claude Nicholson, several people
- Claude Nicolas (born 1941), French middle-distance runner
- Claude Nicolet (1930–2010), French historian
- Claude Nicollier (born 1944), first Swiss astronaut
- Claude Nicot (1925–2003), French actor
- Claude Nicouleau (born 1961), French speed skater
- Claude Niépce (1763–1828), French inventor
- Claude Nobs (1936–2013), Swiss businessman
- Claude Noël (born 1955), Canadian ice hockey player
- Claude Noel (boxer) (1948–2023), Trinidad and Tobago boxer
- Claude Noisette de Crauzat (born 1938), French musicologist and organ specialist
- Claude Nollier (1919–2009), French actress
- Claude Nougaro (1929–2004), French jazz singer
- Claude Nowell (1944–2008), American entrepreneur and religious teacher
- Claude Obsomer, Belgian Egyptologist
- Claude Oestges, Belgian engineer
- Claude Olievenstein (1933–2008), French psychiatrist
- Claude Ollier (1922–2014), French writer
- Claude Olney (1931–1995), college professor and author
- Claude Onesta (born 1957), French handball player
- Claude Osteen (born 1939), American baseball player
- Claude Overton (1927–1996), American basketball player
- Claude Pache (born 1943), French rower
- Claude Pacot, French architect
- Claude Paillat (1924–2001), French historian, journalist and writer
- Claude V. Palisca (1921–2001), 20th century authority on early music, professor of music at Yale
- Claude Panier (1912–1990), French politician
- Claude Papesch (died 1987), New Zealand musical artist
- Claude Papi (1949–1983), French footballer
- Claude Paradin (1510–1573), French writer, collector, historian and genealogist
- Claude Parent (1923–2016), French architect
- Claude Parfaict (1705–1777), French theatre historian
- Claude Paris (1808–1866), French composer
- Claude Parisot (c. 1704–1784), French organ builder
- Claude V. Parsons (1895–1941), American politician
- Claude Pascal (1921–2017), French composer
- Claude Passeau (1909–2003), American baseball player
- Claude Patrick (born 1980), Canadian mixed martial arts fighter
- Claude Patry (born 1953), Canadian politician
- Claude E. Payne (born 1932), American episcopal bishop
- Claude Payton (1882–1955), American actor
- Claude Pélieu (1934–2002), French poet, translator and artist
- Claude J. Pelletier, French editor and game designer
- Claude Pelly (1902–1972), Royal Air Force commander
- Claude Pelon (born 1992), American football player
- Claude Péloquin (1942–2018), Canadian poet, writer, singer, songwriter, screenwriter and director
- Claude Penz (1924–2006), French alpine skier
- Claude Pepper (1900–1989), American politician
- Claude Perchat (1952–2022), French graphic designer and illustrator
- Claude Perraudin (1948–2001), French musician
- Claude Perrault (1613–1688), French architect
- Claude Perron (born 1966), French actress
- Claude Perrot (born 1951), French alpine skier
- Claude Peter (1947–2022), French basketball player
- Claude Petit, French politician
- Claude Philippe (1910–1978), British-born French-American restaurateur
- Claude Phillip (born 1942), Trinidadian cricketer
- Claude Phillips (1846–1924), English writer
- Claude Picard (born 1938), French sprint canoer
- Claude Picasso (1947–2023), French filmmaker, designer and artist
- Claude Pickens, American missionary and photographer
- Claude de Picques (1515–?), French bookbinder
- Claude Piel (1921–1982), French aircraft designer
- Claude Piéplu (1923–2006), French actor
- Claude Pierrat (born 1963), French cross-country skier
- Claude Pilon, Canadian football player and wrestler
- Claude Pinard (born 1949), Canadian politician
- Claude Piquemal (born 1939), French sprinter
- Claude Piron (1931–2008), linguist and psychologist
- Claude Pivi (1960–2026), Guinean military officer and politician
- Claude Platt (1904–1966), Australian sports shooter
- Claude Plessier (born 1946), French painter
- Claude Poirier (born 1938), Canadian journalist
- Claude Poissant (1955–2025), Canadian theater director, actor and screenwriter
- Claude Pollard (1874–1942), American lawyer
- Claude Ponsard (1927–1990), French economist
- Claude Poole, American baseball player
- Claude Pompidou (1912–2007), widow of President Georges Pompidou
- Claude R. Porter (1872–1946), American politician
- Claude Porter White (1907–1975), American author and composer
- Claude Portolan, French rugby union player
- Claude Pouillet (1790–1868), French physicist
- Claude Poullart des Places (1679–1709), French catholic priest
- Claude Pouteau (1725–1775), French surgeon and inventor
- Claude Pronovost (1935–2022), Canadian ice hockey player
- Claude Prosdocimi (1927–2016), French footballer and coach
- Claude Prouvoyeur (1927–2018), French politician
- Claude Provencher (1949–2022), Canadian architect
- Claude Provost (1933–1984), Canadian ice hockey player
- Claude Pruneau (born 1960), Canadian-American nuclear physicist
- Claude Puel (born 1961), French association football player and manager
- Claude Pujade-Renaud (1932–2024), French writer
- Claude Quenneville (born 1949), Canadian sports commentator in Quebec
- Claude Quétel, French historian
- Claude Quittet (born 1941), French footballer
- Claude Raffestin (1936–2025), Swiss geographer
- Claude Raffy (born 1945), French swimmer
- Claude Raguet Hirst (1855–1942), American painter
- Claude Rains (1889–1967), British-born American actor
- Claude Rajon (1866–1932), French politician
- Claude Ramey (1754–1838), French sculptor
- Claude Ramsey (1943–2018), American farmer and politician
- Claude Rapin (born 19??), archaeologist specialising in Central Asian studies
- Claude Ravinet (born 1943), Belgian field hockey player
- Claude Raymond (born 1937), Canadian baseball player
- Claude Reeds (1890–1974), American football player and coach
- Claude Reid, Canadian politician
- Claude Reignier Conder (1848–1910), British military officer and explorer
- Claude Renoir (1913–1993), French cinematographer
- Claude Ribbe (born 1954), French writer, activist and filmmaker
- Claude Rich (1929–2017), French actor
- Claude Richardson (1900–1969), Canadian politician
- Claude Riche (1762–1797), French naturalist
- Claude Richmond (born 1935), Canadian politician
- Claude Rifat (1952–2002), French biologist
- Claude Rigby (1882–1960), Irish cricketer and radiologist
- Claude Rijmenans (born 1948), Belgian ambassador
- Claude Riley (born 1960), American basketball player
- Claude Rilly (born 1959), French linguist and archaeologist
- Claude Ritchey (1873–1951), American baseball player
- Claude Rivière (born 1932), French anthropologist
- Claude Robert (1928–2007), Canadian ice hockey player
- Claude C. Robinson (1881–1976), Canadian ice hockey and sports executive
- Claude E. Robinson (1900–1961), American advertising researcher
- Claude Rock (1863–1950), Australian schoolmaster and cricketer
- Claude Rogers, several people
- Claude Rohla (1951–2011), Luxembourgish archer
- Claude G. Ross, American diplomat
- Claude Ross (1893–1917), Australian track and field athlete
- Claude Rossi (born 1937), Monegasque sailor
- Claude Rossman (1881–1928), American baseball player
- Claude Rothgeb (1880–1944), American athlete and coach
- Claude Rouer (1929–2021), French road cyclist
- Claude Joseph Rouget de Lisle (1760–1836), French writer and composer
- Claude Rousseau (born 1953), Canadian archer
- Claude Roussel, Canadian sculptor
- Claude Roussel (athlete) (1941–1992), French bobsledder
- Claude Roux (born 1945), French lichenologist and esperantist
- Claude Rowe (1904–1973), Australian rules footballer
- Claude Roy, several people
- Claude Rubie (1888–1939), English cricketer and soldier
- Claude Ruel (1938–2015), Canadian ice hockey coach
- Claude Ruey (born 1949), Swiss politician
- Claude Ruggieri (1777–1841), French pyrotechnician
- Claude Russell-Brown (1873–1939), Canadian tennis player
- Claude Rutault (1941–2022), French painter
- Claude Ryan (1925–2004), Canadian journalist and politician
- Claude Rye, British speedway rider
- Claude Ryf (born 1957), Swiss footballer and manager
- Claude Sabbah (born 1954), French mathematician
- Claude Sadio (born 1943), Senegalese basketball player
- Claude Sahut (1883–1932), French architect
- Claude Saint-Cyr (1911–2002), French milliner
- Claude Salhani (1952–2022), Lebanese-American photographer, photojournalist and author
- Claude Sallier (1685–1761), French librarian
- Claude Saluden (1937–1996), French boxer
- Claude Samuel (1931–2020), French music critic
- Claude Sandoz (born 1946), Swiss visual artist
- Claude Santelli (1923–2001), French film director
- Claude Sarraute (1927–2023), French writer and journalist
- Claude Saunders (1912–2007), Canadian rower
- Claude Saunier (1943–2022), French politician
- Claude Saurel (1948–2025), French rugby union player and coach
- Claude Sautet (1924–2000), French film director and screenwriter
- Claude Sauvage (1936–2011), French cyclist
- Claude Savoie, several people
- Claude Scott-Mitchell, Australian actress
- Claude Frédéric-Armand Schaeffer (1898–1982), French archaeologist
- Claude Schnitzler, French organist and conductor
- Claude Schwob, American nuclear chemist
- Claude Scudamore Jarvis (1879–1953), British colonial Governor and journalist
- Claude Stephane Seanla (born 1988), Ivorian footballer
- Claude Seignolle (1917–2018), French author
- Claude Serre (1938–1998), French cartoonist
- Claude Shannon (1916–2001), American information theorist, mathematician, and electrical engineer
- Claude Sheppard (1916–2001), Canadian politician and magistrate
- Claude Allin Shepperson (1867–1921), British artist, illustrator and joke cartoonist
- Claude Sicard (1677–1726), French Jesuit priest and Egyptologist
- Claude Silberzahn (1935–2020), French civil servant
- Claude Henry da Silva (1891–1980), Singaporean lawyer
- Claude A. Simard (1943–2014), Canadian painter
- Claude Simon (1913–2005), French novelist
- Claude Simons, several people
- Claude Simpol (1666–1711), French painter
- Claude Sintes (born 1953), French archaeologist and curator
- Claude Sionnest (1749–1820), French naturalist
- Claude Sirvent (born 1971), French international rugby league footballer
- Claude Sitton (1925–2015), American journalist
- Claude Smeal (1918–1993), Australian long-distance runner
- Claude Smith, several people
- Claude Soulé (1911–1969), French field hockey player
- Claude Spanghero (born 1948), French rugby player
- Claude V. Spratley (1882–1976), American judge
- Claude St. Sauveur (born 1952), Canadian ice hockey player
- Claude Thomas Stanfield Moore (1853–1901), English painter
- Claude Stanlake (1882–1960), Australian rules footballer
- Claude Steele (born 1946), American social psychologist and professor
- Claude Steiner (1935–2017), American psychotherapist and psychologist
- Claude Stin (1922–2007), Russian-French artist
- Claude Stone Jr. (1926–2014), American politician
- Claude U. Stone (1879–1957), American politician
- Claude van der Straaten (1905–1962), Ceylonese cricketer
- Claude Strebelle (1917–2010), Belgian architect
- Claude Sullivan (1924–1967), American sportscaster
- Claude J. Summers, American literary scholar
- Claude Surprenant (born 1963), Canadian politician
- Claude A. Swanson (1862–1939), American lawyer and politician
- Claude Sylvain (1930–2005), French actress and singer
- Claude Taittinger (1927–2022), French businessman
- Claude Taugher (1897–1963), recipient of the naval cross
- Claude Taylor, several people
- Claude Teisseire (1931–2025), former French international rugby league footballer
- Claude Terrasse (1867–1923), French composer
- Claude Terrell (born 1982), American football player
- Claude Terry (born 1950), American basketball player
- Claude Tessier (1943–2010), Canadian politician
- Claude Testot-Ferry (1773–1856), French cavalry veteran
- Claude Thomas, several people
- Claude Thomassin (1865–1942), French bow maker
- Claude R. Thomson (1933–2010), Canadian lawyer
- Claude Thorburn (born 1987), Namibian cricket umpire
- Claude Thornhill (1908–1965), American pianist, composer and arranger
- Claude E. Thornhill (1893–1956), American football player and coach
- Claude Tillier (1801–1844), French novelist and pamphleteer
- Claude Tircuy de Corcelle (1768–1843), French politician
- Claude Charles du Tisné, French soldier and Illinois country explorer
- Claude Tissendier (born 1952), French jazz reedist and bandleader
- Claude Titre (1930–1985), French actor
- Claude Tollet (born 1949), French cyclist
- Claude Toovey (1896–1978), Australian rules footballer
- Claude Toukéné-Guébogo (born 1975), Cameroonian sprinter
- Claude Tousignant (born 1932), Canadian artist
- Claude Tozer (1890–1920), Australian cricketer
- Claude Trahan (1939–1975), Canadian ski jumper
- Claude Treglown (1893–1980), English cricketer
- Claude Tresmontant (1925–1997), French philosopher, Hellenist and theologian
- Claude Troisgros (born 1956), French chef
- Claude Trudel (born 1942), Canadian politician
- Claude Frédéric t'Serclaes, Count of Tilly (1648–1723), Dutch general
- Claude Tudor, United States Air Force general
- Claude Turmes (born 1960), Luxembourgish politician
- Claude Vaillancourt (born 1944), Canadian politician
- Claude H. Van Tyne (1869–1930), American historian
- Claude Vandersleyen (1927–2021), Belgian Egyptologist
- Claude Vasconi (1940–2009), French architect
- Claude Vellefaux (1505–?), French architect
- Claude Ventura (born 1938), French film director
- Claude Joseph Vernet (1714–1789), French painter
- Claude Verret (born 1963), Canadian ice hockey player
- Claude Verspaille (born 1964), Belgian footballer and manager
- Claude Viallat (born 1936), French contemporary painter
- Claude Videgla (born 1990), Togolese footballer
- Claude Viens (born 1949), Canadian handball player
- Claude Vigée (1921–2020), French poet and academic
- Claude Vignon (1593–1670), French painter
- Claude Vilgrain (born 1963), Haitian-born Canadian ice hockey player
- Claude Alvin Villee Jr. (1917–2003), American biologist
- Claude de Vin des Œillets (1637–1687), a mistress of King Louis XIV of France
- Claude Vincendeau (born 1954), French cyclist
- Claude Virden (born 1947), American basketball player
- Claude Virgin (1928–2006), British fashion photographer
- Claude de Visdelou (1656–1737), French missionary
- Claude Vivier (1948–1983), Canadian composer
- Claude Volter (1933–2002), Belgian comedian and theatre director
- Claude VonStroke (born 1971), American musical artist
- Claude Wagner (1925–1979), Canadian politician
- Claude Warner (1882–1965), Welsh cricketer
- Claude Nelson Warren (1932–2021), American archaeologist
- Claude A. Watson (1885–1978), American politician
- Claude Weaver (1867–1954), American politician
- Claude Weaver III (1923–1944), American-Canadian World War II flying ace
- Claude Weisz (1939–2019), French film director
- Claude Welch (disambiguation), several people
- Claude Weston (1879–1946), New Zealand lawyer, soldier and politician
- Claude Wharton (1914–2003), Australian politician
- Claude Whatham (1927–2008), English film and TV director
- Claude White, several people
- Claude Whittindale (1881–1907), English rugby union player
- Claude R. Wickard (1893–1967), American politician
- Claude Wilborn (1912–1992), American baseball player
- Claude Wild, Swiss diplomat
- Claude Wilkinson (born 1959), American poet and artist
- Claude A. Williams, U. S. Army general
- Claude Willoughby (1898–1973), American baseball player
- Claude Wilson (1858–1881), English footballer and cricketer
- Claude Wilson (ice hockey) (1893–1976), Canadian ice hockey player
- Claude Windal (born 1939), French field hockey player
- Claude Winter (1931–2011), French stage and film actress
- Claude Wiseler (born 1960), President of the Chamber of Deputies of Luxembourg
- Claude Wroten (born 1983), American gridiron football player
- Claude Zdanow, American musical artist
- Claude Zidi (born 1934), French film director and screenwriter
- Claude Zilberberg (1938–2018), French semiotician
- Fernande Grudet (1923–2015), also known as "Madame Claude", French brothel keeper

== Animal ==
- Claude (alligator), an albino alligator who lived at the California Academy of Sciences

== Fictional characters ==
- Claude, from the anime series Beyblade G-Revolution
- Claude, from the Bleach franchise
- Claude Speed, protagonist of the video games Grand Theft Auto 2 and Grand Theft Auto III
- Claude, from the television series Heroes
- Claude Cat, from the Looney Tunes and Merrie Melodies cartoon series from Warner Bros.
- Claude Frollo, villain of the Victor Hugo novel The Hunchback of Notre-Dame
  - Claude Frollo (Disney character), from the 1996 film adaptation
- Claude von Riegan, one of the three main lords from the video games Fire Emblem: Three Houses and Fire Emblem Warriors: Three Hopes
