= Panier =

Panier can refer to:

- Old French for pannier, a kind of basket
- Le Panier, bakery and pastry shop in Seattle, Washington, U.S.
- Claude Panier, French politician

== See also ==
- Pannier (disambiguation)
