= Treglown =

Treglown is a surname. Notable people with the surname include:

- Claude Treglown (1893–1980), English cricketer
- Jeremy Treglown (born 1946), English literary scholar
