= Guiguet (surname) =

Guiguet is a surname. Notable people with the surname include:

- Claude Guiguet (born 1947), French pentathlete
- François Guiguet (1860–1937), French painter
- Jean-Claude Guiguet (1939–2005), French film director and screenwriter
- Joseph-Henri Guiguet (1891–1979), French World War I flying ace
- Lucien Guiguet (born 1942), French pentathlete
- Naïla Guiguet (born 1988), French director
