= Delbeke =

Delbeke is a surname. Notable people with the surname include:

- Claude Delbeke (1935–2024), Belgian civil engineer and philatelist
- Gérard Delbeke (1898–1984), Belgian footballer
