= Claude Bertrand =

Claude Bertrand may refer to:

- Claude Bertrand (neurosurgeon) (1917–2014), Canadian neurosurgeon
- Claude Bertrand (actor) (1919–1986), French actor
