= Claude Hunt =

Claude Hunt may refer to:

- Claude J. Hunt (1886–1962), American football player and coach
- Claude Hunt (Australian footballer) (1887–1959), Australian rules footballer
