= Michel Verin =

Italian poet from Florence

- Born: 1468; Florence
- Died: 1487 (aged 18–19); Florence
- Occupation: Poet
- Writing career
- Language: Greek, Latin, Italian, and Spanish

Michel Verin (1468–1487) was a 15th-century Florentine poet.

== Early life ==
Verin was born in 1468 in Florence to a father by the name of Hugolino. His father instructed him in philosophy and language from an early age before sending him to a seminary at the age of ten. There he learned multiple languages and studied history as well as philosophy. Verin was widely considered to have good character with several folk tales be written about it.

== Career ==
Verin's first publication was in 1481 at the age of 13. It was published under the title Moral Distichs which was a collection of Latin maxims reduced into a poetic form. This work was well received by critics of the time. The next year he published a book of Proverbs in verse.

== Death and legacy ==
Verin died in 1487 and is considered to have influenced the works of people including Claude Hardy and Ritchlet.
