= Claude White =

Claude White may refer to:

- Claude Grahame-White (1879–1959), English pioneer of aviation
- Claude White (footballer) (1904–1981), English footballer
- Claude Porter White (1907–1975), American author and composer
