= Claude Gauthier =

Claude Gauthier may refer to:

- Claude Gauthier (singer) (born 1939), singer-songwriter from the Canadian province of Quebec
- Claude Gauthier (ice hockey), hockey player that was drafted first overall but never played in the NHL
- Claude Gauthier (painter), a Monegasque painter.
