= Claude Dambreville =

Haitian writer and painter (1934–2021)

Claude Dambreville (17 December 1934 – 15 March 2021) was a Haitian writer and painter. He won the annual literary Henri Deschamps award for his novel, Un gout de Fiel.

== Biography ==
Claude Dambreville was born in Port-au-Prince, Haiti on 17 December 1934. From a very young age he began writing and drawing. His first job was running a local radio station, and in his spare time he would submit humorous articles and hand-drawn comics to a weekly Haitian newspaper. In 1968, he enrolled at the Centre d'Arte in Port-au-Prince and began taking art classes. Around the same time, he took correspondence courses from the ABC school of Paris, and then enrolled at L'Atelier, a Haitian school owned by the artist Nehemy Jean. During his time in school he began successfully working full time as an artist. While studying at L'Atelier in 1973, he met and married the daughter of one of his teachers, Bettyna Savain. In 1981, he received a grant from the United States to tour art schools and museums giving lectures on his work and Haitian art.

He and his wife moved to the Dominican Republic and lived in Puerto Plata from 1999 to 2011. They then moved to Miami, Florida with their two children, Vadim and Tao-Claude. Dambreville died on 15 March 2021, at the age of 86.

== Novels ==
In 1983 he wrote his most important novel, Un gout de Fiel, and in 1995 he co-wrote the book, L'Amerique Saigne, with Franck Etienne, which became a national best seller in Haiti.

== Painting ==
Claude Dambreville is best known for his paintings of Haitian women at market. His style combines bold, minimalistic 2D color blocking, with soft, brushy modeling along with a strong use of light and shadow. His more contemporary works have focused on portrait style painting of women, children and musicians. When asked how he chooses his subject matter he said, "I take my inspiration from the popular and rustic life of Haiti. In my opinion, it's the only way to identify myself as a Haitian Painter."

== Principal collections ==
- Centre d'Art, Port-au-Prince, Haiti
- The Museum of College St. Pierre, Port-au-Prince, Haiti
- Nader Art Gallery, Miami, Florida
- Jolicoeur Gallery, Havelock, Ontario
- Galerie Issa, Port-au-Prince, Haiti
- Medalia Gallery, New York City, New York
- Waterloo Center for the Arts, Waterloo, Iowa
