= Claude Gasnal =

French basketball player (1949–2025)

Personal information
- Born: 12 February 1949 Le Mans, France
- Died: 11 August 2025 (aged 76)
- Listed height: 6 ft 8 in (2.03 m)

Career information
- Playing career: 1966–1979
- Position: Small forward

Career history
- 1966–1979: SCM Le Mans

Claude Gasnal (12 February 1949 – 11 August 2025) was a French basketball player who played as a small forward.

Gasnal played his entire career with SCM Le Mans from 1966 to 1979. He also played in 95 games for the French national team from 1969 to 1975.

Gasnal died on 11 August 2025, at the age of 76.
