= Claude Bice =

American football coach

Biographical details
- Born: September 4, 1879; Marion, Iowa, U.S.
- Died: June 24, 1953 (aged 73); Salina, Kansas, U.S.
- Education: Western State Normal (KS)

Coaching career (HC unless noted)

Football
- 1908–1909: Hays Normal

Basketball
- 1908–1910: Hays Normal

Head coaching record
- Overall: 4–3–2 (football); 15–2 (basketball)

Claude Francis Bice (September 4, 1879 – June 24, 1953) was an American college football and college basketball coach. He served as the head football coach at Western Branch of the Kansas State Normal School—now known as Fort Hays State University—from 1908 to 1909, compiling a record of 4–3–2. He was a part-time gymnasium instructor at the school during the 1902–03 academic year.
