= Claude Stanlake =

Australian rules footballer

Personal information
- Full name: Claude Alexander Stanlake
- Born: 12 October 1882; Cootamundra, New South Wales
- Died: 19 August 1960 (aged 77); Perth, Western Australia
- Original team: Preston Juniors
- Height: 173 cm (5 ft 8 in)

Playing career^{1}
Years	Club	Games (Goals)
1902–03	St Kilda	18 (4)
- ^{1} Playing statistics correct to the end of 1903.

Claude Alexander Stanlake (12 October 1882 – 19 August 1960) was an Australian rules footballer who played with St Kilda in the Victorian Football League (VFL).

Recruited from Victorian Football Association (VFA) club Preston Football Club juniors, Stanlake made his senior VFL debut in Round 12 1902 against Collingwood Football Club at Victoria Park, and played six games in his debut season. He played a further twelve games in 1903.

After living in Brunswick, in 1915 Stanlake moved to the Northern Territory to gain work and was a leading player in the early seasons of the Northern Territory Football League (NTFL).

Stanlake married Sarah Charlotte on 27 February 1904 and had five children. When he moved to the Northern Territory, Sarah Charlotte and the children remained in Melbourne. On 11 November 1918, Stanlake sought a divorce from Sarah Charlotte on the ground of misconduct with a Mr Les Gillan. In August 1917, Sarah Charlotte had pleaded guilty in the Melbourne Criminal Court to a charge of concealment of birth, where "after intimacy, she had given birth to a stillborn child, which she put in a box and placed in a room at the Jolimont railway station." Stanlake was granted a decree nisi.

== Sources ==
- Holmesby, R. & Main, J. (2014) The Encyclopedia of AFL Footballers: every AFL/VFL player since 1897 (10th ed.). Seaford, Victoria: BAS Publishing. ISBN 978-1-921496-32-5.
- Lee, D. & Barfoot, M. (1996) NTFL, Northern Territory Football League: Darwin. ISBN 0 646 26754X.
