= Claude Smith =

Claude Smith may refer to:

- Claude Smith (1891-1931), American politician, Arizona State Senator
- Claude T. Smith {1932 – 1987), American band leader
