= Claude Lefebvre =

Claude Lefebvre may refer to:

- Claude Lefèbvre (1633–1675), French painter and engraver
- Claude Lefebvre (handballer) (born 1952), Canadian handball player
- Claude Lefebvre (ice hockey) (born 1964), Canadian ice hockey player and coach
- Claude Lefebvre (politician) (1929–2016), Canadian municipal politician
- Claude Lefebvre (composer) (1930-2012), French composer (fr:Claude Lefebvre)
