= Claude Imbert =

French philosopher and logician (born 1933)

- Born: 16 October 1933 (age 92)

Claude Imbert (born 16 October 1933) is a French philosopher, logician, and translator of Gottlob Frege.

== Education and career ==
Imbert earned an agrégation in 1955 at the École normale supérieure, and is a professor emeritus of the École normale supérieure.

== Books ==
Imbert's works include:

- Les fondements de l'arithmétique (translation of Gottlob Frege's The Foundations of Arithmetic (Coll. "L'ordre philosophique", Paris: Ed. du Seuil, 1969)
- Ecrits logiques et philosophiques (translation of Gottlob Frege's essays on logic and philosophy (Coll. "L'ordre philosophique", Paris: Ed. du Seuil, 1971)
- Phénoménologies et langues formulaires (Coll. "Epiméthée", Paris: PUF, 1992)
- Pour une histoire de la logique: Un héritage platonicien (Paris: PUF, 1999)
