= Claude Elliott =

Claude Elliott may refer to:

- Claude Elliott (baseball) (1876–1923), baseball player for the Cincinnati Reds and the New York Giants
- Claude Elliott (schoolmaster) (1888–1973), headmaster and later Provost of Eton College in the United Kingdom

== See also ==
- Claud Elliott Provincial Park, a provincial park in British Columbia, Canada
