= Claude Denman =

Australian rules footballer

Personal information
- Full name: Claude Sydney William Denman
- Born: 3 April 1896; Minyip, Victoria
- Died: 27 May 1958 (aged 62); Box Hill, Victoria
- Position: wing

Playing career^{1}
Years	Club	Games (Goals)
1920	St Kilda	2 (0)
- ^{1} Playing statistics correct to the end of 1920.

Claude Sydney William Denman (3 April 1896 – 27 May 1958) was an Australian rules footballer and a local junior who played with St Kilda in the Victorian Football League (VFL).
