= Claude LaBrosse =

Canadian ice hockey player

- Born: 31 August 1934 (age 90); Montreal East, Quebec, Canada
- Height: 5 ft 11 in (180 cm)
- Weight: 175 lb (79 kg; 12 st 7 lb)
- Position: Defence
- Shot: Left
- Played for: AHL; Rochester Americans; Quebec Aces; AHL; Chicoutimi Saguenéens; Shawinigan-Falls Cataracts; EPHL; Hull-Ottawa Canadiens; WHL; Victoria Maple Leafs; Phoenix Roadrunners; IHL; Des Moines Oak Leafs
- Playing career: 1955–1971

Claude LaBrosse (born 31 August 1934) is a Canadian retired professional ice hockey defenceman. His professional career spanned from 1956 to 1971.

Following the 1960–61 season, in which the Rochester Americans failed to qualify for the playoffs, the Montreal Canadiens transferred their working agreement to the Quebec Aces of the American Hockey League and sent Rochester players LaBrosse and Guy Rousseau to Quebec. Rochester re-acquired LaBrosse for the 1968–69 AHL season by purchasing his rights from the Phoenix Roadrunners.
