= Claude Julien =

Claude Julien may refer to:

- Claude Julien (ice hockey) (born 1960), Canadian ice hockey coach
- Claude Julien (journalist) (1925–2005), French journalist
- Claude Julien, mayor of Lescure-d'Albigeois, France
