= Claude Kinder =

Claude Kinder may refer to:

- Claude Kinder (1897–1949), partner in Barton, Kinder and Alderson
- Claude W. Kinder (1852–1936), English engineer
