= Claude Paillat =

French historian, journalist and writer

Claude Paillat (11 January 1924 in Paris, France – 19 January 2001 in Paris) was a French historian, journalist and writer.

In 1946 Claude Paillat, started a career as a journalist and in 1949 joins the weekly Paris-Match, who sent him to Indochina and to Korea. For several years he followed the political events in Morocco and Algeria. In 1961, he published his first book: Le Dossier Secret de l'Algérie, 1958-1961. This book marked a turning point in writing French contemporary history, it brought investigative journalism, personal accounts from some of the main actors, oral testimony that broke the veil of state secrets.

In 1972, he establishes his series of secret files on contemporary France, Dossiers Secrets de la France Contemporaine. Based on memories and documents, most published for the very first time, rare photographs, often taken from family archives, the Dossiers Secrets take us through the events of the end of World War I and its disastrous Treaty of Versailles until the end of the Second World War.

The Dossiers Secrets offer the most original perspective on our knowledge of France in the 20th century, not only in Paris, but also from the main economic regions such as Lille, Nantes, Lyon, Bordeaux and Marseille.

Through Claude Paillat's work many key figures have been able to relate their stories, events that may have otherwise never been committed to paper.

Paillat was a journalist who became a best-selling historian. His most significant work is his eight-volume Dossiers secrets de la France contemporaine, a series that covers the span of French history from the conclusion of the First World War to the end of the Second. He also published a two-volume study of the Algerian War; a monograph on the French defeat in Indochina, as well as one on the last turbulent year of Charles de Gaulle's presidency; and a two part history of the Catholic Church in France.

Paillat's books enjoyed popular success while at the same time being based on exhaustive research. He not only made use of various French archives, he also relied on the extensive contacts he had made across French society, including members of the military, leading industrialists, and politicians. These contacts allowed Paillat to consult, and in some cases acquire, personal collections of correspondence and other documents, many of which formed the basis of the detailed descriptions of events and personalities in his books. His exclusive access to such documents also give Paillat's books - most of which contain the word "secret" in the title - the aspect of revealing confidential or privileged information. Paillat referred to his research methods as yielding a "tapestry" woven from various sources.

The Research Materials are arranged according to Paillat's original French subject headings, with additional identification provided at the folder level. The materials include copies of many official documents, private correspondence, as well as clippings and academic studies. There are numerous military records - intelligence reports, campaign journals and correspondence - relating to the French experience in World War II. There are also many documents generated by the French national police (Gendarmerie Nationale) during the Vichy period. Additionally, there are copies of reports on France in the 1930s originating from the United States embassy in Paris, as well as other American documents concerning France and North Africa in World War II.

The Paillat papers contain substantial materials emanating from the French colonial administrations in Indochina and North Africa. The Indochina materials span the period from the 1920s to the French defeat at Dien Bien Phu, and include some documents describing the increasing American involvement in Vietnam in the 1950s. There are extensive materials in the collection pertaining to the Algerian War, including many documents relating both to the Algerian nationalist movement and the military rebellion by rightwing French officers against de Gaulle. There are also many police and intelligence reports from Algeria in the 1920s and 1930s.

The research materials are particularly rich in the local and regional history of France. Paillat was interested in documenting the family histories of the French economic elite ( patronat) and conducted many interviews with members of this social class. The collection has numerous tape recordings and transcripts of these interviews. There is extensive documentation of the interwar years in France, on domestic politics and little studied movements such as Bourgeoisie Chrétienne, Redressement Français, and X-Crise. There are also materials relating to various social reform initiatives in France, including documents acquired by Paillat from the personal collections of Aymé Bernard and Achille Liénart.

The Paillat papers contain press accounts and leaflets pertaining to the protest movement of French students and workers in May–June 1968. There are also significant materials on the years following de Gaulle's resignation as president, including the Mitterrand era. These largely relate to French political parties, election campaigns, and a number of public scandals involving allegations of corruption and bribery.

The Correspondence series contains a large general file that is arranged chronologically. This consists largely of letters received by Paillat from the readers of his books, as well as a considerable number of letters from the contacts who provided him information and documents in aid of his research. The Writings series of the papers contain the drafts of many of Paillat's books, as well as his correspondence with his publishers, readers, and those sources who had provided him with information and documents for the writing of his books. In this series, there are also numerous articles written by Paillat during his career as a journalist for the newspaper, Le Canard enchaîné. The articles focus on French politics as well reporting on business trends among French media companies.

Claude Paillat's archives have been acquired by the Hoover Institution, Stanford University in California. The archives contain many interviews and papers relating to French political and economic history in the 20th century. Access to the archives can be made through the Hoover Institute and a register of the archives are being made at Paillat Archives.

Acquired in 2008, the Claude Paillat papers in the Hoover Institution Archives represent a substantial documentary resource on modern French history. At present, they are the single largest collection relating to France in the holdings of the archives. The large bulk of the papers consists of the research materials used by Paillat in the preparation of his books on France during the period between the end of World War I and the aftermath of World War II. There are additional materials relating to the wars in Indochina and Algeria; to the local and regional history of 20th century France; to the presidencies of Charles de Gaulle, Georges Pompidou, Valéry Giscard d'Estaing, and François Mitterrand; and to French economic history.

The collection includes 435 manuscript boxes, 14 card file boxes, 4 oversize boxes a total of 183.7 linear feet.

== Bibliography ==
- Dossier Secret de l'Algérie (1958–1961); published by Presses de la Cité.
- 2e Dossier Secret de l'Algérie (1954–1958);published by Presses de la Cité.
- Dossier Secret de L'indochine;published by Presses de la Cité.
- Dossier Secret de l'Eglise de France;published by Presses de la Cité
  - Tome 1: De Clovis à la Révolution;published by Presses de la Cité
  - Tome 2: De la révolution à nos jours;published by Presses de la Cité
- Dossier Secret des Conclaves
- Archives Secretes: 1968-1969, Les Coulisses d'une année terrible; published by Denoël
- L'Echiquier D'Alger (1940–1944)
  - Vol 1: Avantage à Vichy
  - Vol 2: De Gaulle joue et gagne
- Vingt ans qui déchirèrent la France (la décolonisation sanglante: Liban- Indochine- Tunisie- Maroc-Algérie)
  - Vol 1: Le Guepier (1945–1953)
  - Vol 2: La Liquidation (1954–1962)
- Dossiers Secrets de la France Contemporaine:
  - I. 1919: Les Illusions de la Gloire
  - II. La Victoire Perdue (1920–1929)
  - III. La Guerre à l'Horizon (1930–1938); published by Robert Laffont, Paris; 1981
  - IV. Le Désastre de 1940:
    - Vol 1: La Répétition Générale.
    - Vol 2: La Guerre Immobile (avril 1939-10 mai 1940);published by Robert Laffont, Paris; 1984.
  - V. La Guerre Eclair (10 mai-24 juin 1940);published by Robert Laffont, Paris; 1985
  - VI. L'Occupation: Le Pillage de la France (juin 1940- nov 1942)
  - VII. L'Occupation: La France dans la Guerre Americaine (8 novembre 1942- 6 juin 1944)
  - VIII. Le Monde sans la France (1944–1945);published by Robert Laffont, Paris; 1991
