= Claude Fell =

Australian rules footballer

Personal information
- Full name: Claude Allan Fell
- Born: 6 December 1892; Tungamah, Victoria
- Died: 11 May 1972 (aged 79); Heidelberg, Victoria
- Original team: Malvern Amateurs

Playing career^{1}
| Years | Club | Games (Goals) |
| 1918 | Richmond | 1 (0) |
- ^{1} Playing statistics correct to the end of 1918.

Claude Allan Fell (6 December 1892 – 11 May 1972) was an Australian rules footballer who played with Richmond in the Victorian Football League (VFL).
