= Claude Sionnest =

French naturalist

Claude Sionnest (Syonnest ou Sionnet) (1749 Lyon - 31 January 1820) was a French naturalist. Born in a family which had traded as pharmacists for two centuries, had an early interest in natural sciences. After four years in the infantry, he became commandant de bataillon during the Reign of Terror. After 27 July 1794, he took charge of the police force in Lyon.

In 1798, Sionnest was named “physicien entomologiste’’ (medical entomologist) within the Société de santé (Health Society). In 1800, he joined the Agriculture Society of Lyon and occupied the post of treasurer for the next ten years. He was interested in entomology and published several memoires on insects harmful to agriculture. Also a botanist, he particularly studied the cryptogams of leaving many new handwritten notes concerning the Scientific Classification classifying systems of Dillen, Johannes Hedwig (1730–1799) and Beauvoir.

Sionnest had also a vast mineralogy collection classified according to the system of René Just Haüy and essayed a mineralogical description of the department of the Rhone. But it was malacology which held all his attention. The many manuscripts which he left show that he was principally concerned to establish ‘’systematic correspondences’’ of the various species current and fossil, terrestrial, fresh-water and marine, described and illustrated in the works of Geoffroy, Jean Louis Marie Poiret (1755–1834), Jean-Baptiste de Lamarck (1744–1829), George Cuvier (1769–1832), Jacques Philippe Raymond Draparnaud (1772–1804) and others less famous. He created his own classifying system to arrange the molluscs in his collection, a problem since it was a very particular system opposed to that of his friend, Draparnaud. His collection included 62 species not appearing in l'Histoire naturelle des Mollusques terrestres et fluviatiles de la France (the Natural History of Terrestrial and Fluviatile Molluscs of France) of Draparnaud and was consulted by Gaspard Louis André Michaud (1795–1880) when he wrote the supplement to this work.
