= Claude Jamet =

French footballer (1929–2021)

Personal information
- Date of birth: August 1929
- Date of death: 16 April 2021 (aged 91)
- Position: Defender

Youth career
- 1940–1949: Châteauroux

Senior career*
Years	Team	Apps	(Gls)
1949–1957	Châteauroux		

International career
- France Amateur
- * Club domestic league appearances and goals

Claude Jamet (1 August 1929 – 16 April 2021) was a French footballer. He played his entire career for LB Châteauroux, from his junior years to his senior career. He also played for the France national amateur football team. He served as president of LB Châteauroux from 1974 to 1989.
