= Claude Thomas =

Claude Thomas may refer to:

- Claude Thomas (baseball) (1890–1946), Major League Baseball pitcher
- Claude Thomas (footballer) (1891–1918), Australian rules footballer
- Claude AnShin Thomas (born 1947), American Zen Buddhist monk and Vietnam War veteran
