= Claude Damas Ozimo =

Gabonese politician

Claude Aristide Damas Ozimo (born 20 July 1939) is a Gabonese politician, currently serving as the First Secretary of the Senate of Gabon. He was previously a Secretary of State in the government and Mayor of Libreville. Damas Ozimo is a member of the governing Gabonese Democratic Party (PDG).

Damas Ozimo is the son of Georges Damas Aleka, who was President of the National Assembly of Gabon from 1964 to 1975. He was Secretary of State at the Ministry of Public Works for a time during the 1980s. Later, he served as Mayor of Libreville until he was succeeded by opposition leader Paul M'ba Abessole after the 1996 municipal election.

In December 2008, the PDG designated Damas Ozimo as its candidate for the first seat from the 4th Arrondissement of Libreville in the 18 January 2009 Senate election. He was re-elected to the Senate and was subsequently re-elected to his post as First Secretary of the Senate on 16 February 2009.
