= Claude Rogers =

Claude Rogers may refer to:

- Claude Rogers (artist) (1907–1979), English painter
- Claude Ambrose Rogers (1920–2005), English mathematician
