= Claude Gauthier (painter) =

Monegasque painter

Claude Gauthier (born 1939) is a Monegasque painter.

== Early life ==
Claude Gauthier was born in 1939 in Neuilly-sur-Seine, France.

== Career ==
Gauthier began painting in 1965. His artwork is in the permanent collection of the Musée international d'Art naïf Anatole Jakovsky in Nice, France. His work was exhibited in Milan, Italy in September 2015. A year later, it was exhibited at the Jardin Exotique de Monaco in June–July 2016.

== Honours ==
- 2011 : Officer of the Order of Cultural Merit.
