= Claude Rivière =

French anthropologist

- Born: 24 December 1932 (age 93); Curzon, France

Claude Rivière (born 24 December 1932, Curzon, Vendée) is a French anthropologist and professor of social anthropology at Sorbonne (Paris V). He is known for his works on social anthropology.

== Publications ==
In English:

- 1968 Guinea: The Mobilization of a People

In French:

- 1965 L’objet social
- 1975 La dynamique de la stratification sociale en Guinée, Paris, H. Champion
- 1995 Les rites profanes
- 2000 Anthropologie politique
- 2008 Socio-anthropologie des religions
- 2013 Introduction à l'anthropologie
