= Claude Delbeke =

Belgian civil engineer and philatelist

Claude Delbeke (born 1935, deceased 2024) was a Belgian civil engineer and philatelist who signed the Roll of Distinguished Philatelists in 1997. He was the Royal Philatelic Society of London's representative for Belgium. The Medaille Claude Delbeke is awarded by the Académie Royale de Philatélie of Belgium of which Delbeke was the former president.

== Selected publications ==
- De Post vanuit de Nederlanden ( 245 blz. - 1989) - De Post naar de Nederlanden (590 blz. – 2004)
- De Nederlandse Scheepspost I. Nederland – Oost-Indië 1600 - 1900 (344 blz. - 1998)
- De Nederlandse Scheepspost II – Nederland – Westen 1600 - 1900 (428 blz. - 2002)
- La Poste Maritime Belge (575 blz. – 2009)
- Le Livre d’Or de la Philatélie Belge (230 blz. – 2006)
- Jaarboek van de Belgische Academie voor Filatelie (25 – 30 – 35 jaar) 1991 – 1996 – 2001
