= Claude Dupuy =

Claude Dupuy may refer to:

- Claude Dupuy (bishop) (1901–1989), Archbishop of Albi
- Claude Dupuy (jurist) (1545–1594), Parisian jurist, humanist and bibliophile
- Claude-Thomas Dupuy (1678–1738), French lawyer and Intendant of New France from 1726 to 1728
