= Claude Gingras =

Canadian journalist and music critic (1931–2018)

- Born: 1 July 1931; Sherbrooke, Quebec
- Died: 30 December 2018 (aged 87)
- Occupations: Journalist; Musical Critic

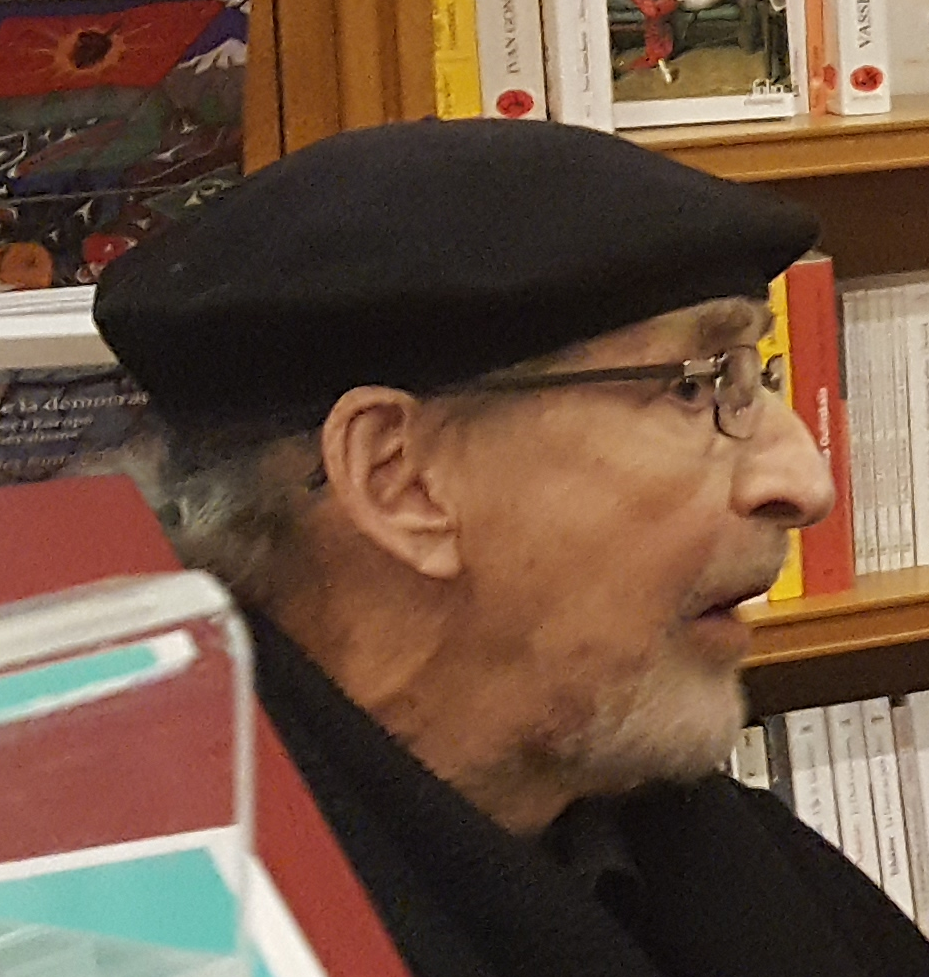
Claude Gingras

Claude Gingras (1 July 1931 – 30 December 2018) was a French Canadian journalist and musical critic.

A native of Sherbrooke, Quebec, Gingras was the youngest of five siblings. He was introduced to music by his mother, who was a pianist, and placed into the St Charles Borromeo Seminary. He studied social sciences at the Université de Montréal and began writing for Sherbrooke's La Tribune in 1952. After collaborating, he began working for La Presse, where he wrote a column on musical criticism. He started out critiquing only opera and classical, but later expanded to pop, variety, and ballet.

Gingras would remain at La Presse for more than 60 years. He covered the Montreal Symphony Orchestra, the Orchestre Métropolitain, the McGill Chamber Orchestra, and I Musici de Montréal.

Claude Gingras retired from La Presse on 28 December 2015, and died on 30 December 2018.
