= Claude Laurgeau =

French engineer

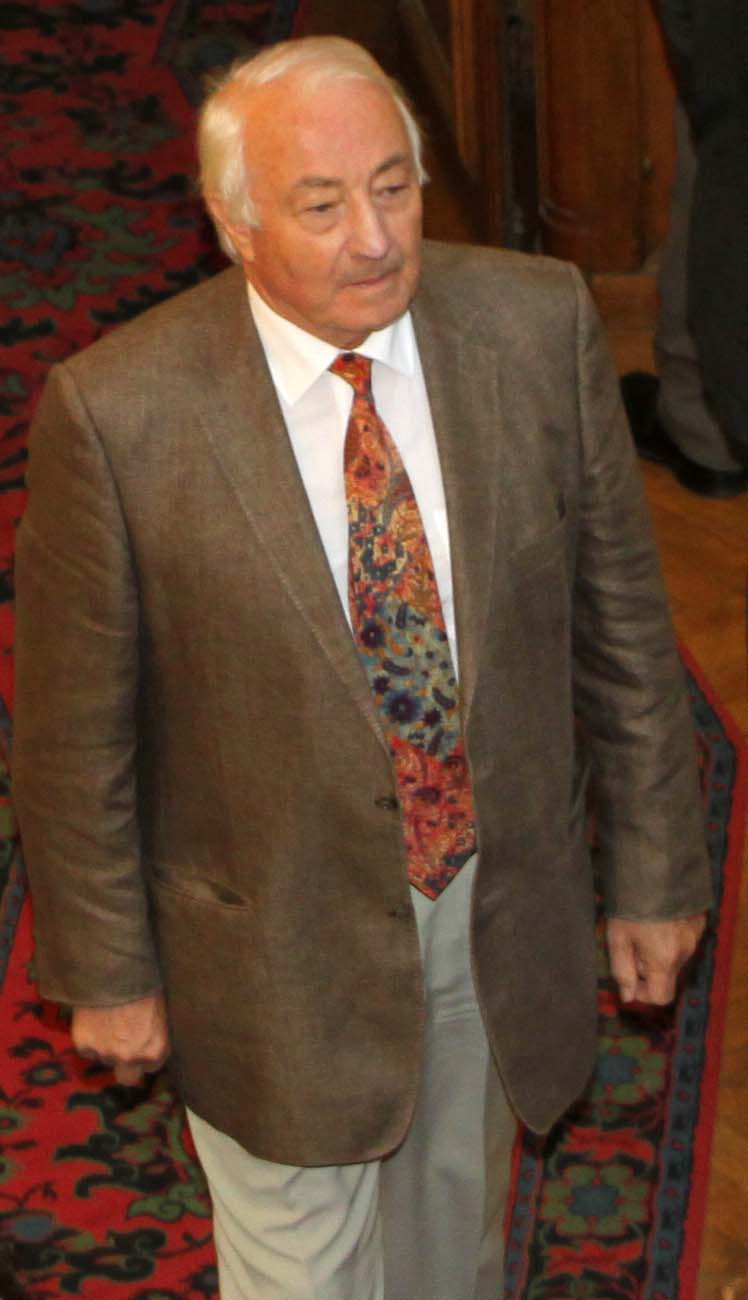
- Claude Laurgeau in the library of MINES ParisTech, Sep. 2012
- Born: November 4, 1942
- Occupations: Professor; Engineer
- Known for: Engelberger Robotics Award

Claude Laurgeau (born November 1942) is a French professor in robotics. His primary interest is intelligent transportation systems.

He was a professor at the University of Nantes from 1975 to 1982, then director of the "Productive robotics research" department at the IT Agency from 1982 to 1987.

In 1989, he was appointed professor at École des Mines de Paris where he created the Robotics Research Center (CAOR) which he directed until February 2008. He officially retired at the end of 2010, while continuing to collaborate on research projects.

He has contributed to the creation of several robotics "start-up" companies, both at the IT Agency and at the École des mines.

He is president of the company Intempora which develops and publishes the software RTMaps.

== Awards ==
- Member of the Order of Academic Palms
- Member of the National Order of Merit
- Grand Jury Prize at the 2004 Léonard Trophies
- Received the Engelberger Robotics Award in 2004

== Books ==
- Programmable automates Dunod, 1978
- The machines of vision - ETA, 1986
- Industrial automation - SCM, 1977
- Languages for Robotics - Hermès,
- Understanding Robotics - AFRI
- The century of the intelligent car - at Press of Mines ParisTech 2009
