= Claude Stin =

Russian-French artist

- Born: 15 May 1922; Tyumen, Russia
- Died: 13 December 2007 (aged 85)
- Occupation: Artist

Claude Stin (15 May 1922 – 13 December 2007) was a Russian–French artist born in Tyumen, Russia. He spent his childhood in Western Siberia where he studied nature during and after school, resulting in several hundred drawings. He audited classes at the Imperial Academy of Arts in Saint Petersburg. After considerable European travel, he arrived in Paris, where he experimented with a number of alternative painting styles. After 1964, he concentrated on painting wildlife pictures.

Claude sold few paintings in his lifetime, passing the bulk of his legacy to his offspring.
