= Claude Alvin Villee Jr. =

American biologist (1917-2003)

Claude Alvin Villee Jr. (9 February 1917, Lancaster, Pennsylvania – 7 August 2003) was an American biologist and long-time teacher at Harvard University.

Born in Lancaster, Pennsylvania, Villee studied in the Franklin and Marshall College and later the University of California. He began teaching in 1941 at Berkeley as a research assistant before becoming an assistant professor at the University of North Carolina. He wrote his first book during this period, on request: a biology textbook that eventually saw eight editions and translation into six languages. Thereafter, Villee worked at Harvard University as a teacher from 1946 until his retirement as Andelot Professor of Biological Chemistry in 1991. During this time, he authored or co-authored 350 publications.
