= Claude Oestges =

Belgian engineer

Claude Oestges is professor at the Catholic University of Louvain (UCLouvain), Louvain-La-Neuve, Belgium. His research interests cover Wireless and satellite communications, with a focus on the propagation channel and its impact on system performance. His present activity concerns multi-dimensional channel modeling for wireless communications, including MIMO and cooperative networks, UWB systems and satellite systems. In 2016, he was elected Chair of COST CA15104 "Inclusive Radio Communication Networks for 5G and Beyond" (IRACON). He was named Fellow of the Institute of Electrical and Electronics Engineers (IEEE) in 2016 for contributions to channel characterization and modeling for multiple-input multipleoutput wireless communications.
