= Claude Guillermet de Bérigard =

French philosopher

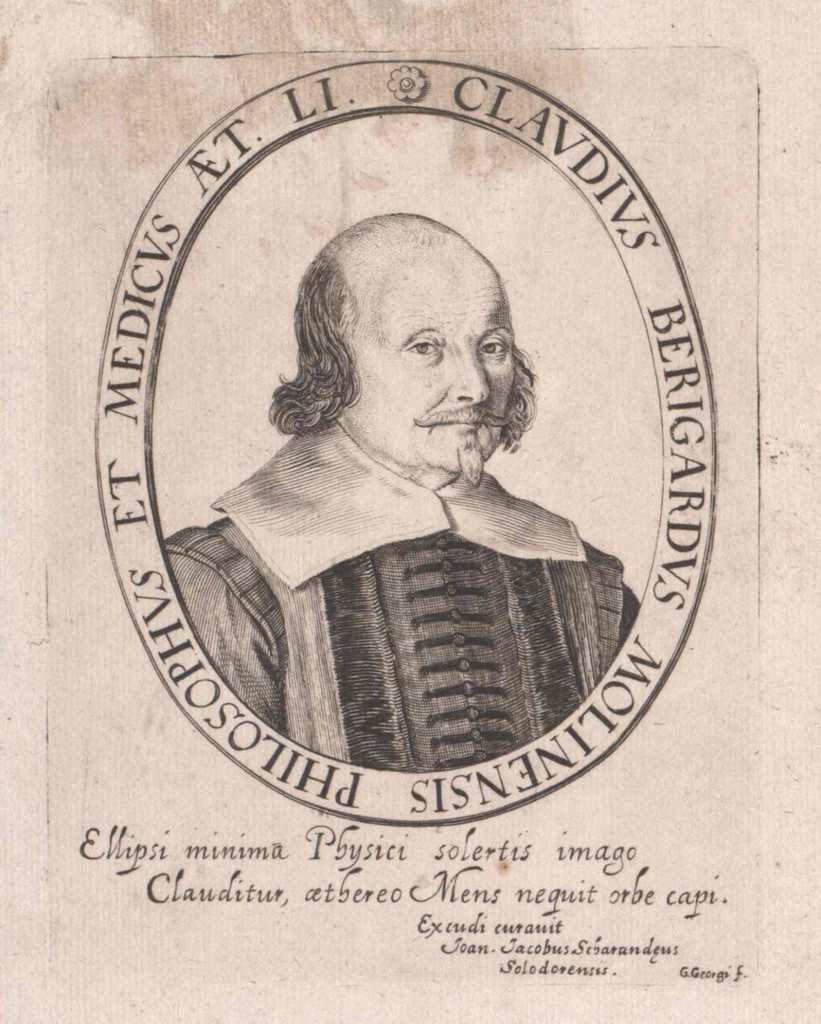
- Claudius Berigardus
- Born: 15 August 1578; Moulins, Bourbonnais, Kingdom of France
- Died: 23 April 1663 (aged 84); Padua, Republic of Venice
- Scientific career
- Fields: Aristotelianism, Geocentrism

Claude Guillermet de Bérigard (15 August 1578, Moulins – 23 April 1663, Padua), also known by the Latin form of his name Claudius Berigardus, was a French philosopher, physician and mathematician who became professor of philosophy at Pisa and Padua. He was a vocal opponent of the theories of Galileo. His last name is sometimes spelled Beauregard.

== Works ==
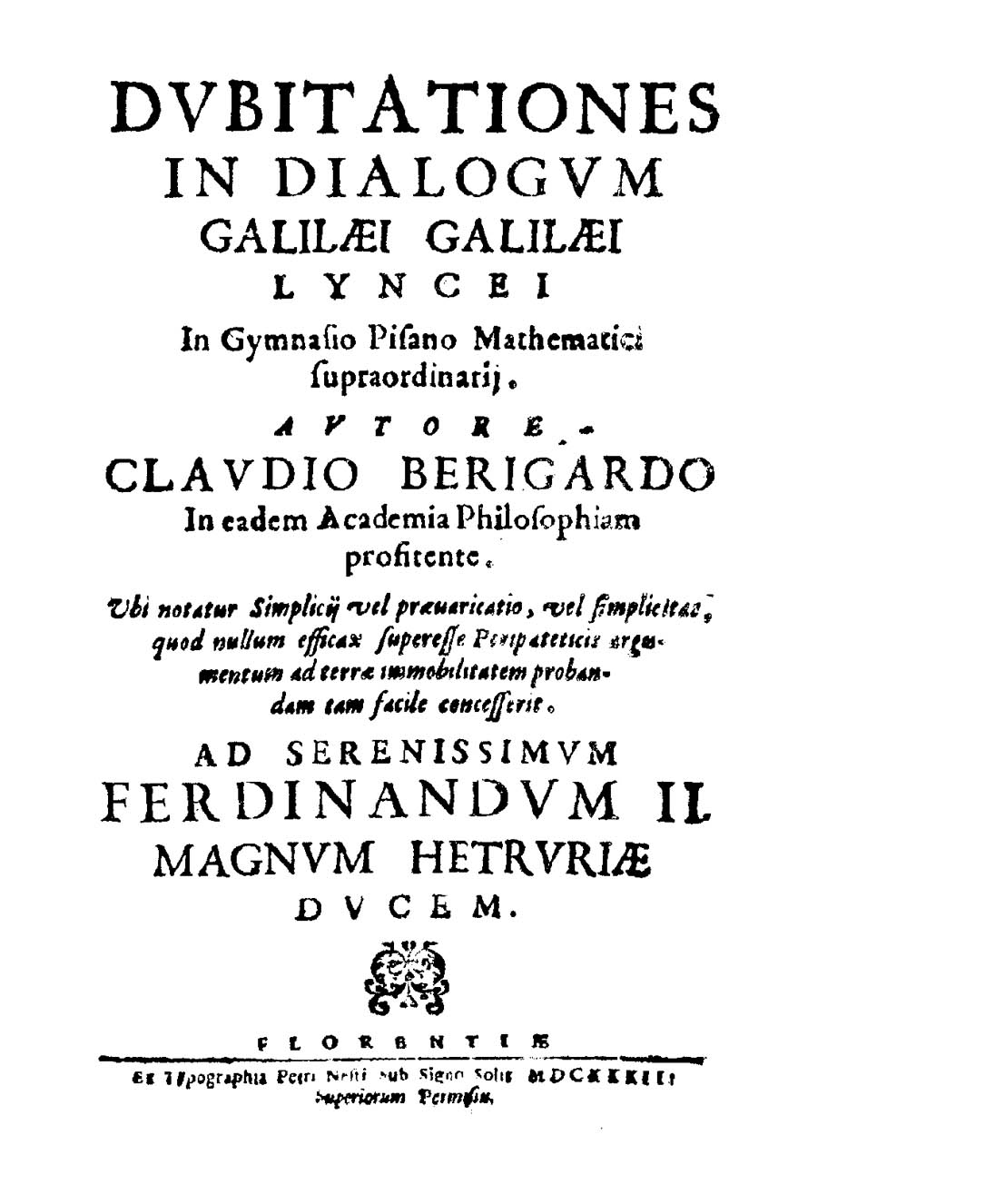
- Dubitationes in dialogum Galilaei Galilaei (1632)
  Dubitationes in dialogum Galilaei Galilaei (Florence, Pietro Nesti, 1632)
- Circulus Pisanus. De veteri et peripatetica philosophia in Aristotelis libros octo Physicorum. Quatuor de coelo. Duos de ortu et interitu. Quatuor de meteoris, et tres de anima (Padua, Paolo Frambotto, 1660–1661)
