= Claude J. Jasper =

American politician

Claude J. Jasper (born 1905/1906, Iowa - November 2 1987, Scottsdale, Arizona) was Chairman of the Republican Party of Wisconsin in 1958. He was also a delegate to the 1964 Republican National Convention.

He married Shirley in 1946, the couple had two children and divorced in 1969. In 1973, he retired and moved to Phoenix, Arizona and died in Scottsdale, Arizona in 1987.
