= Claude Bertrand (neurosurgeon) =

Canadian neurosurgeon

- Born: March 28, 1917; Sherbrooke, Quebec, Canada
- Died: August 7, 2014 (aged 97); Montreal, Quebec
- Known for: Neurosurgeon
- Awards: Order of Canada

Claude Bertrand CC (March 28, 1917 – August 7, 2014) was a Canadian neurosurgeon.

Born in Sherbrooke, Quebec, he received a Bachelor of Arts in 1934 and a Doctor of Medicine from Université de Montréal in 1940. Elected a Rhodes Scholar in 1940, he went to Oxford in 1946, to work under Professor LeGros Clarke and Professor Graham Weddell.

In 1971, he was made a Companion of the Order of Canada "for his research work and his contribution to the advancement of neurosurgery".

He died on August 7, 2014. He was 97 years old.
