= Claude Perchat =

French graphic designer and illustrator (1952–2022)

- Born: 28 February 1952; Paris, France
- Died: 12 November 2022 (aged 70)
- Occupations: Graphic designer Illustrator

Claude Perchat (28 February 1952 – 12 November 2022) was a French graphic designer and illustrator.

== Biography ==
Perchat began her artistic career with La Poste in 2000. The creator of many first day of issue covers, she also illustrated many of the designs of the historical collections of postage stamps. She was the author of the travel diary La France à Vivre, published by La Poste in 2004. Her last stamp was issued in 2018, the distributor stamp of the national exhibition of maximaphily in Valenciennes.

Claude Perchat died on 12 November 2022, at the age of 70.
