= Claude Savoie =

Claude Savoie may refer to:

- Claude Savoie (politician), Canadian politician.
- Claude Savoie (policeman), Canadian policeman.
- Claude de Savoie
