= Claude Fagedet =

French photographer

- Born: 30 March 1928; Narbonne, France
- Died: 26 June 2017 (aged 89)
- Occupation: Photography

Claude Fagedet (30 March 1928 – 26 June 2017) was a French photographer. He took many photographs of Occitanie, including his hometown of Narbonne and the chalets in Gruissan. He also took photographs on his many trips abroad. He was awarded the Meilleur Ouvrier de France.

His funeral took place on June 29, 2019 at the Saint-Just Saint-Pasteur cathedral in Narbonne.
