= Claude Miller (baseball) =

American baseball player

- Pitcher
- Born: March 14, 1914; Clarksdale, Mississippi, U.S.
- Died: July 10, 1974 (aged 60); St. Louis, Missouri, U.S.
- Threw: Right

Negro league baseball debut
- 1937, for the St. Louis Stars

Last appearance
- 1937, for the St. Louis Stars

Teams
- St. Louis Stars (1937)

Claude Miller (March 14, 1914 – July 10, 1974) was an American Negro league baseball pitcher in the 1930s.

A native of Clarksdale, Mississippi, Miller played for the St. Louis Stars in 1937. He died in St. Louis, Missouri in 1974 at age 60.
