= Claude Black =

Claude Black may refer to:

- Claude Black (minister) (1916–2009), American Baptist minister
- Claude Black (musician) (1932–2013), American jazz pianist
