= Claude Gaillard =

French politician

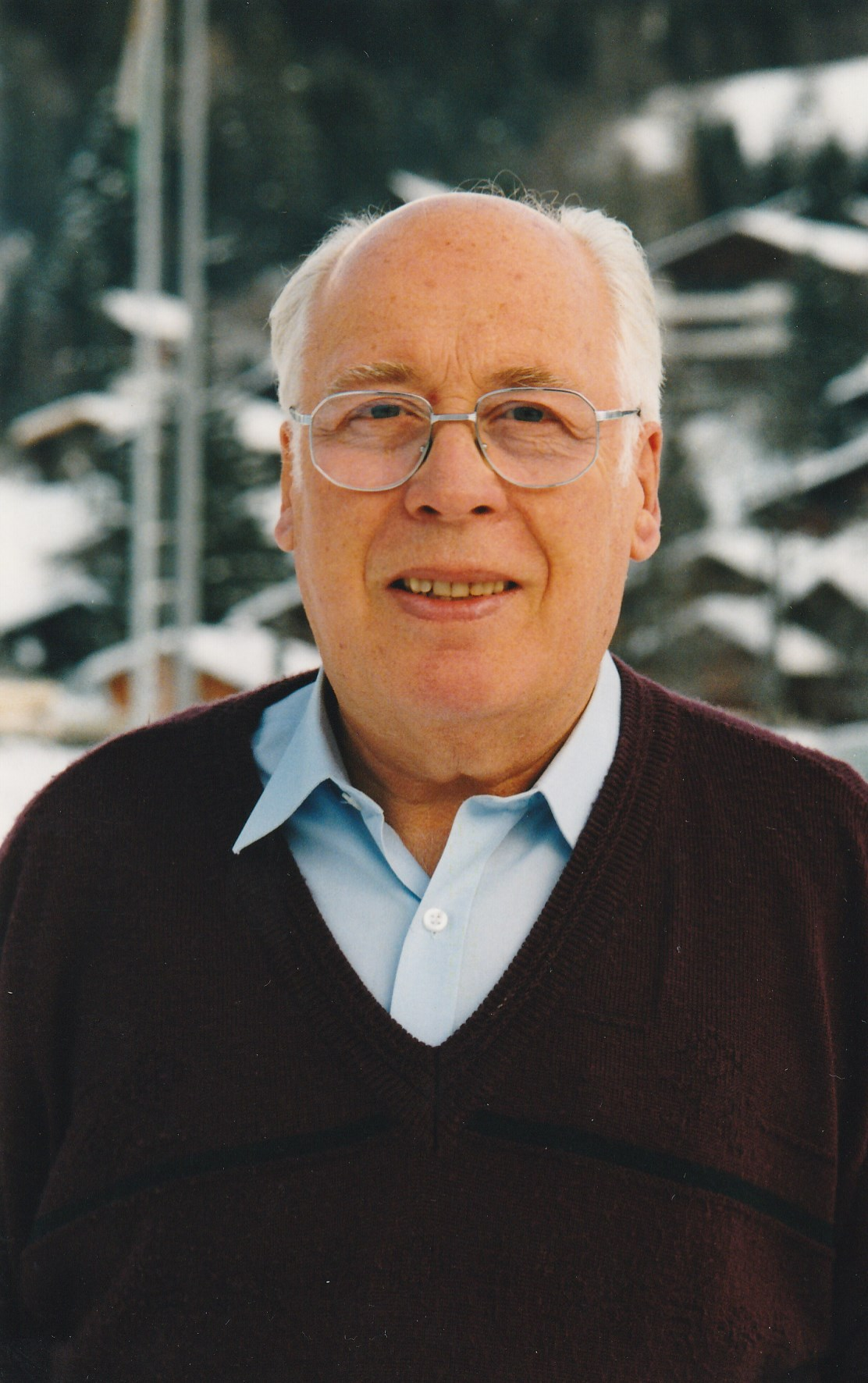
Gaillard in 1999

Claude Gaillard (born 15 August 1944 in Montriond) was a member of the National Assembly of France. He represents the Meurthe-et-Moselle department, and is a member of the Union for a Popular Movement.
