= Claude Moisy =

French journalist (1927–2020)

- Born: 26 June 1927; Caen, France
- Died: 21 September 2020 (aged 93)
- Occupations: Journalist; Writer

Claude Moisy (26 June 1927 – 21 September 2020) was a French journalist and writer. He was President of the Agence France-Presse from 1990 to 1993.

== Biography ==
Moisy began his journalistic career with Ouest-France. He spent a large part of his career in the United States for the Agence France-Presse (AFP). President of the AFP from 1990 to 1993, a period of economic crisis in France, Moisy oversaw international development and new technologies within the press agency. Before retiring, he drew a sketch of an ideal AFP President, one "not too easy to identify politically" and able to speak fluent English. Throughout his career at the AFP, he covered events in Rangoon, Delhi, London, and, lastly, Washington, D.C., where he covered the Watergate scandal. He was succeeded at the helm of the AFP by Lionel Fleury. He was the penultimate journalist to lead the agency, with Jean Miot being the only other recent journalist to preside over the AFP.

Subsequently, Moisy joined Reporters Without Borders. In the autumn of 2009, he wrote a column in Le Monde defending the credibility of the AFP.

Claude Moisy died on 21 September 2020 at the age of 93.

== Books ==
- La Birmanie (1963)
- L'Amérique sous les armes (1970)
- Nixon et le Watergate: La chute d'un président (1994)
- Foreign News Flow in the Information Age (1996)
- L'Amérique en marche arrière (1996)
- John F. Kennedy (1917–1963) (2003)
- Le citoyen Genêt. La révolution française à l'assaut de l'Amérique (2007)
