= Claude Hauet =

French field hockey player (1915–1995)

Claude Alfred Marie Hauet (25 March 1925 – 21 June 1995) was a French field hockey player who competed in the 1948 Summer Olympics and in the 1952 Summer Olympics.
