= Claude Ramsey =

American farmer and politician (1943–2018)

Claude Thomas Ramsey (April 4, 1943 – June 18, 2018) was an American farmer and politician.

Ramsey lived in Chattanooga, Tennessee and was a strawberry farmer. He served on the Hamilton County Commission and as county mayor of Hamilton County. Ramsey served on the 1977 Tennessee Constitutional Convention. Ramsey also served in the Tennessee House of Representatives from 1973 to 1977 and was a Republican. Tennessee Governor Bill Haslam appointed Ramsey to be a deputy to the governor. After he retired, Ramsey started a government relations business: the River Branch Strategies, in 2015.
