= Claude Raffestin =

Swiss geographer (1936–2025)

Claude Raffestin (15 September 1936 – 25 September 2025) was a Swiss geographer. He was a professor of human geography at University of Geneva.

== Life and career ==
Raffestin was born in Paris on 15 September 1936.

His work primarily dealt with territoriality and relied heavily on Michel Foucault’s work about power. His most influential book Pour une géographie du pouvoir has been translated into Spanish, Italian and (Brazilian) Portuguese.

Raffestin died in Turin, Italy on 25 September 2025, at the age of 89.

== Publications ==
- C. Raffestin. 2012. Space, Territory, and Territoriality. Environment and Planning D: Society and Space. 30(1):121–141. doi:10.1068/d21311
- "Territoriality - A Reflection of the Discrepancies Between the Organization of Space and Individual Liberty", International Political Science Review, Vol. 5, No. 2, 139–146 (1984). DOI 10.1177/019251218400500205
- "Could Foucault have revolutionized Geography?", In: Space, Knowledge and Power, Chapter 14. Translated by Gerald Moore.
- Pour une géographie du pouvoir, Librairies techniques, 1980 ISBN 978-2-7111-0271-6. (Italian: Per una geografia del potere, 1983; Portuguese: Por uma geografia do poder, 1993)
- Géopolitique et histoire by Claude Raffestin, Dario Lopreno and Yvan Pasteur; Payot 1995. ISBN 978-2-228-88901-8
- "L’actualité et Michel Foucault", espacestemps, 2005.
- "Foucault aurait-il pu révolutionner la géographie?" In: Au risque de Foucault. Paris: Éditions du Centre Pompidou, 1997, pp. 141–149.
