= Claude Ménard =

Claude Ménard may refer to:

- Claude Ménard (athlete) (1906–1980), French high jumper
- Claude Ménard (economist) (born 1944), Canadian economist and professor
