= Claude Leroy (field hockey) =

French field hockey player

Personal information
- Nationality: French
- Born: 2 October 1935 Le Mans, France
- Died: 20 April 2004 (aged 68) Meulan-en-Yvelines, France

Sport
- Sport: Field hockey

Claude Roger Victor Leroy (French pronunciation: [klod ʁɔʒe viktɔʁ ləʁwa]; 2 October 1935 – 20 April 2004) was a French field hockey player. He competed in the men's tournament at the 1960 Summer Olympics.
