= Claude Mackay =

Indian-born English cricketer

Claude Mackay (29 October 1894 – 7 June 1915) was an Indian-born English cricketer. He was a right-handed batsman and right-arm medium-fast bowler who played for Gloucestershire. He was born in Satara and died in Boulogne.

Mackay made a single first-class appearance for the team, during the 1914 season, against Kent. Mackay scored 13 runs in the first innings in which he batted, and 15 runs in the second. He conceded 24 runs with the ball from six overs of bowling.

Mackay died at the age of just 20 during World War I, less than a year after his sole cricketing appearance.
