= Claude Paris =

French composer

Claude Paris (19 September 1808 – 25 July 1866) was a 19th-century French composer.

== Career ==
Paris was born in Lyon and studied musical composition with Jean-François Lesueur at the Conservatoire de Paris. In 1826, he won the Premier Grand Prix de Rome with the cantata Herminie. During his stay in Rome he performed the opéra bouffe L'Allogio militaire at the Teatro San Benedetto in Venice in 1829.

After his return to Paris in 1830, his Missa da Requiem was performed at the church Notre-Dame-des-Victoires. In 1831, the annual meeting of the "Académie royale des Beaux-Art" was opened with a performance of the overture to his lyrical tragedy Elmyra. Paris composed the opéra comique La Veillée for the Paris Opera (Salle Ventadour).

Paris worked as a conductor at the Théâtre du Panthéon and taught in Paris and Lyon.
