= Claude Boucher =

Claude Boucher may refer to:

- Claude Boucher (politician) (1942–2025), Canadian politician in Quebec
- Claude R. Boucher, first general manager of Videon Cablesystems
