= Claude Fournier =

Claude Fournier may refer to:

- Claude Fournier (revolutionary) (1745–1825), French personality of the Revolution
- Claude Fournier (filmmaker) (1931–2023), Canadian film director, screenwriter, editor and cinematographer
