= Claude Simons =

Claude Simons may refer to:

- Claude Simons Jr. (1914–1975), Tulane University football and basketball coach
- Claude Simons Sr. (1887–1943), Tulane University basketball, baseball, and track coach, and football trainer
