= Claude Batho =

French photographer

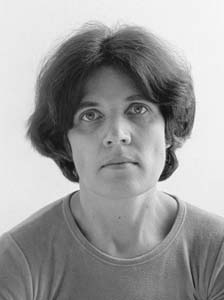
Image of Batho Claude

Claude Louise Batho (née Bodier; 1 June 1935 – September 1981) was a French photographer. She is remembered for the detailed images of her home and for her series on Claude Monet's garden at Giverny.

== Biography ==
Batho was born in Chamalières in the Puy-de-Dôme and was first introduced to photography when her father bought her a camera. Batho graduated in photography from the École des arts appliqués in 1956. She went on to work in the archives at the Bibliothèque nationale de France where she met her husband, John Batho, also a photographer. In 1975 she created her first portfolio which featured portraits of her two daughters. In 1977 her photographs were exhibited at the Galerie Agathe Gaillard. Also in 1977, she published her book Le Moment des Choses, featuring her black-and-white photographs. These photographs document details of the inside of her home: a broom leaning against a wall, a fading bunch of flowers, her little daughter asleep on the couch. Her images of Claude Monet's garden at Giverny, taken in October 1980, shortly before she died, also include glimpses of her family, almost as if their fleeting figures were included by accident. The square-shaped prints contrast sharply with the formats of Monet's own works.

Claude Batho died of cancer when she was only 46.

== Works ==
- Batho, Claude; Schavelzon, Irène (1977). Le moment des choses. Des Femmes. ISBN 978-2-7210-0101-6.
- Batho, Claude; Batho, John (1982). Claude Batho, photographe. Des femmes. ISBN 9782721002365.
- Batho, Claude; Olsina, Coline (2023). Instants très simples. Contrejour. ISBN 9791090294578.
- Batho, Claude (1986). Giverny, la mémoire d'un jardin. A.D.A.C. ISBN 978-2-905811-01-1.

== Exhibitions ==
- 1977: Gallerie Agathe Gaillard, Paris
- 1982: Retrospective at the Musée d'Art Moderne de la Ville de Paris

Examples of Claude Batho's photographs can be seen online at the Centre Pompidou.
