= Claude Cornish =

Australian rules footballer

Personal information
- Full name: Claude Cannon Cornish
- Born: 31 August 1888; Kensington, South Australia
- Died: 25 June 1975 (aged 86); Malvern, Victoria
- Original team: Prahran (VFA)

Playing career^{1}
Years	Club	Games (Goals)
1910	Carlton	3 (1)
- ^{1} Playing statistics correct to the end of 1910.

Claude Cannon Cornish (31 August 1888 – 25 June 1975) was an Australian rules footballer who played with Carlton in the Victorian Football League (VFL).
