= Claude Cymerman =

French classical pianist

Claude Cymerman (born 2 October 1947) is a contemporary French classical pianist.

== Biography ==
Born in Metz (Moselle department), Cymerman dedicated himself very early to music and began his training in a provincial conservatory before finishing it at the Conservatoire de Paris where he studied with Pierre Sancan.

After winning several national and international competitions, including the second grand prize at the Long-Thibaud-Crespin Competition, Cymerman continued his studies at Indiana University with György Sebők. Appreciated by President Georges Pompidou, Cymerman began his career as a concertist, chamber music instrumentist, but also as soloist with the Orchestre de Radio France, the Orchestre national des Pays de la Loire, the Orchestre national d'Île-de-France, the Orchestre Symphonique de Limoges, the Luxembourg Philharmonic Orchestra, the San Francisco Symphony, as well as that of Indianapolis. He is regularly invited to perform and give masterclasses in major festivals in France, Germany, Italy, Sweden, Japan and Israel. He is a frequent guest on the French national radio and the BBC.

In 1982, he agreed to play the composer Brahms for a French TV film. He also played with cellist Gary Hoffman and violinist Federico Agostini, with whom he has recorded works by Erich Korngold.
