= Claude McFayden =

Australian rugby league footballer and administrator

Personal information
- Full name: Claude McFayden
- Born: 28 February 1887; Sydney, New South Wales, Australia
- Died: 3 June 1947 (aged 60); Sydney, New South Wales, Australia

Playing information
- Position: Centre, Wing
Club
Years	Team	Pld	T	G	FG	P
1908–16	Western Suburbs	92	18	0	0	54
- Source: As of 25 June 2019

Claude McFayden was an Australian rugby league footballer who played in the 1900s and 1910s. He played for Western Suburbs in the New South Wales Rugby League (NSWRL) competition. McFayden was a foundation player for Western Suburbs.

== Playing career ==
McFayden made his first grade debut for Western Suburbs against Glebe in Round 3 1908 at Wentworth Park which was during the opening season of the New South Wales Rugby League (NSWRL) competition in Australia.

McFayden played in Western Suburbs first ever victory against Newtown in Round 9 1908 at Wentworth Park which ended with a score of 6-5. The win would be Western Suburbs only victory of the season and the club finished second last on the table above last placed Cumberland who were dissolved at the conclusion of the season.

McFayden played with Wests up until the end of 1916 but his time at the club was difficult with the side finishing last in 1909, 1910, 1912, 1913, 1915 and 1916. The club also narrowly avoided coming last in 1914 finishing just above last placed Annandale. At the time of his retirement, McFayden was one of Western Suburbs longest serving players.

== Post playing ==
McFayden would go on to be a selector and a trainer at Western Suburbs. He then became a committeeman at the club and coached the Western Suburbs Presidents Cup team. McFayden died in 1947 which was disclosed in the club's annual report stating “Western Suburbs Football lost one of its greatest stalwarts in Claude McFayden, who passed away suddenly during the season. Claude was member of the District Club since its inception. Firstly as a player, then a trainer and then a committeeman. Also, during his association with the club, he had on various occasions acted as coach to our lower grades”.
