= Claude Fauchet =

Claude Fauchet may refer to:

- Claude Fauchet (historian) (1530–1602), French historian
- Claude Fauchet (revolutionist) (1744–1793), French bishop and revolutionist
