= Claude Courchay =

French novelist (1933–2024)

- Born: 5 November 1933; Dakar, French Senegal, French West Africa
- Died: 8 February 2024 (aged 90); Digne-les-Bains, France
- Education: Agrégation d'histoire
- Occupation: Novelist

Claude Courchay (5 November 1933 – 8 February 2024) was a French novelist.

Courchay notably received the Grand prix RTL-Lire for his novel Retour à Malaveil.

== Biography ==
Born in Dakar, French West Africa on 5 November 1933, Courchay earned an Agrégation d'histoire. During the 1970s, he wrote articles in the magazine Les Temps modernes. He was described favorably by Simone de Beauvoir in her book Tout compte fait. In 1992, he published La vie comme avant, which took place in a small village in Alpes-de-Haute-Provence and was narrated by a farmer who lives alone.

Claude Courchay died in Digne-les-Bains on 8 February 2024, at the age of 90.

== Works ==
- La vie finira bien par commencer (1972)
- La Soupe chinoise (1973)
- Chroniques pour un cochon malade (1974)
- N'oubliez pas la lutte des classes (1976)
- Avec des cœurs acharnés (1978)
- Les Matins célibataires (1978)
- Les Américains sont de grands enfants (1979)
- Une petite maison avec un grand jardin (1980)
- Demain la veille (1981)
- L'Annonce faite à Matcho (1981)
- Matcho et les fourmis blanches (1982)
- Retour à Malaveil (1982)
- Un ami de passage (1983)
- Chemin de repentance (1984)
- Quelque part tout près du cœur de l'amour (1985)
- Histoire du Point-Mulhouse (1986)
- Avril est un mois cruel (1987)
- L'Embellie (1988)
- Des fourmis plein le cœur (1989)
- Chronique d'un été (1990)
- Jean des Lointains (1990)
- La Vie comme avant (1992)
- Retour à Daussane (1994)
- Chronique des Collines (1995)
- Deux pas dans les nuages (1995)
- Quelqu'un dans la vallée (1997)
- L'homme est un animal des lointains (1997)
- On ne meurt plus d'amour (1998)
- Des journées ocre et sèches (1999)
- Veillée d'armes (1999)
- La Foire aux Agnelles (2002)
- Drôle de tribu (2003)
- Seuls sont les indomptés (2005)
- La Sauvagine (2007)
