= Claude Toovey =

Australian rules footballer

Personal information
- Full name: Claude Henry St Leonard Toovey
- Born: 24 November 1896; Parkside, South Australia
- Died: 28 January 1978 (aged 81); South Australia
- Original teams: Norwood, Ballarat
- Height: 178 cm (5 ft 10 in)
- Weight: 69 kg (152 lb)

Playing career^{1}
Years	Club	Games (Goals)
1919–22	Norwood	33 (3)
1923 & 26	South Ballarat	?
1924-25	Birchip	?
1927	Fitzroy	15 (0)
1928	Nhill	?
- ^{1} Playing statistics correct to the end of 1927.

Career highlights
- 1922 Norwood premiership player; 1924 - Birchip premiership captain-coach; 1926 - South Ballarat premiership player

Claude Henry St Leonard Toovey (24 November 1896 – 28 January 1978) was an Australian rules footballer who played with Fitzroy in the Victorian Football League (VFL).

In 1923, Toovey was captain coach of South Ballarat Football Club, who lost the grand final by one point to Ballarat Football Club.

In 1923, Toovey was named the Ballarat FL's champion player by The Ballarat Star newspaper.

In 1924, Toovey continued on as captain-coach of South Ballarat on a Saturday and then also accepted a position as coach of Birchip Football Club in the Wimmera Football League, as they play on a Wednesday.

Toovey went onto captain-coach Nhill Football Club in 1928.
