= Claude Buridant =

French linguist

Claude Buridant (born 12 February 1938, in Arras) is a French linguist, professor emeritus of French and Romance philology at the University of Strasbourg (formerly Marc Bloch University) in Strasbourg. He is director of the Centre for Linguistics and Romance Philology in Strasbourg.

His research focuses on the history of translation in the Middle Ages and the Renaissance, as part of the study of Romance languages, lexicography and paremiology.

He is the author of such works as a grammar of Old French.

== Works ==
- 1976. Nature and function of proverbs in jeux-partis. Revue des sciences humaines 163.3 (1976): 377–418.
- 1976. La traduction du pseudo-Turpin du manuscrit Vatican Regina 624. Vol. 142. Librairie Droz.
- 1980. Les binômes synonymiques. Esquisse d'une histoire des couples de synonymes du Moyen Age au XVIIe siècle in Synonymies. Bulletin du Centre d'Analyse du discours 4 (1980): 5-76.
- 1981. Les proverbes et la Prédication au Moyen Age. Actas du Colloque deparémiologie.
- 1986. Lexicographie et glossographie médiévales. Esquisse de bilan et perspectives de recherche in Lexicographie au moyen-âge. Lexique 4 (1986): 9-46.
- 1987. "L'ancien français à la lumière de la typologie des langues: les résidus de l'ordre OV en ancien français et leur effacement en moyen français." Romania 108.429 (1987): 20–65.
- 1987. Les particules séparées en ancien français. Romanistique–Germanistique: une confrontation, C. Buridant (éd.), Strasbourg: Presses Universitaires de Strasbourg (1987): 167–204.
- 1987. Historische Phraseologie des Französischen.
- 1990. Johannes Bechert, Giuliano Bernini, Claude Buridant. Toward a Typology of European Languages. Walter de Gruyter.
- 1999. Nature et fonctions ses proverbes dans le Moyen-Âge français: Essai d'aperçu synthétique. Nouveaux Cahiers d'Allemand 17.3 497–513.
- 2003. Grammaires du vulgaire - Normes et variations de la langue française. Presses Universitaires de Vincennes.
- 2005. La substantivation de l'infinitif en ancien français : aperçu et perspective. Langue française 2005/3 (n° 147), pp. 98–120.
- 2006. L'interjection: jeux et enjeux. Langages (2006): 3–9.
