= Claude Bowes-Lyon =

Claude Bowes-Lyon may refer to:

- Claude Bowes-Lyon, 13th Earl of Strathmore and Kinghorne (1824–1904)
- Claude Bowes-Lyon, 14th Earl of Strathmore and Kinghorne (1855–1944), father of Queen Elizabeth The Queen Mother
