= Claude Hickson =

New Zealand cricketer

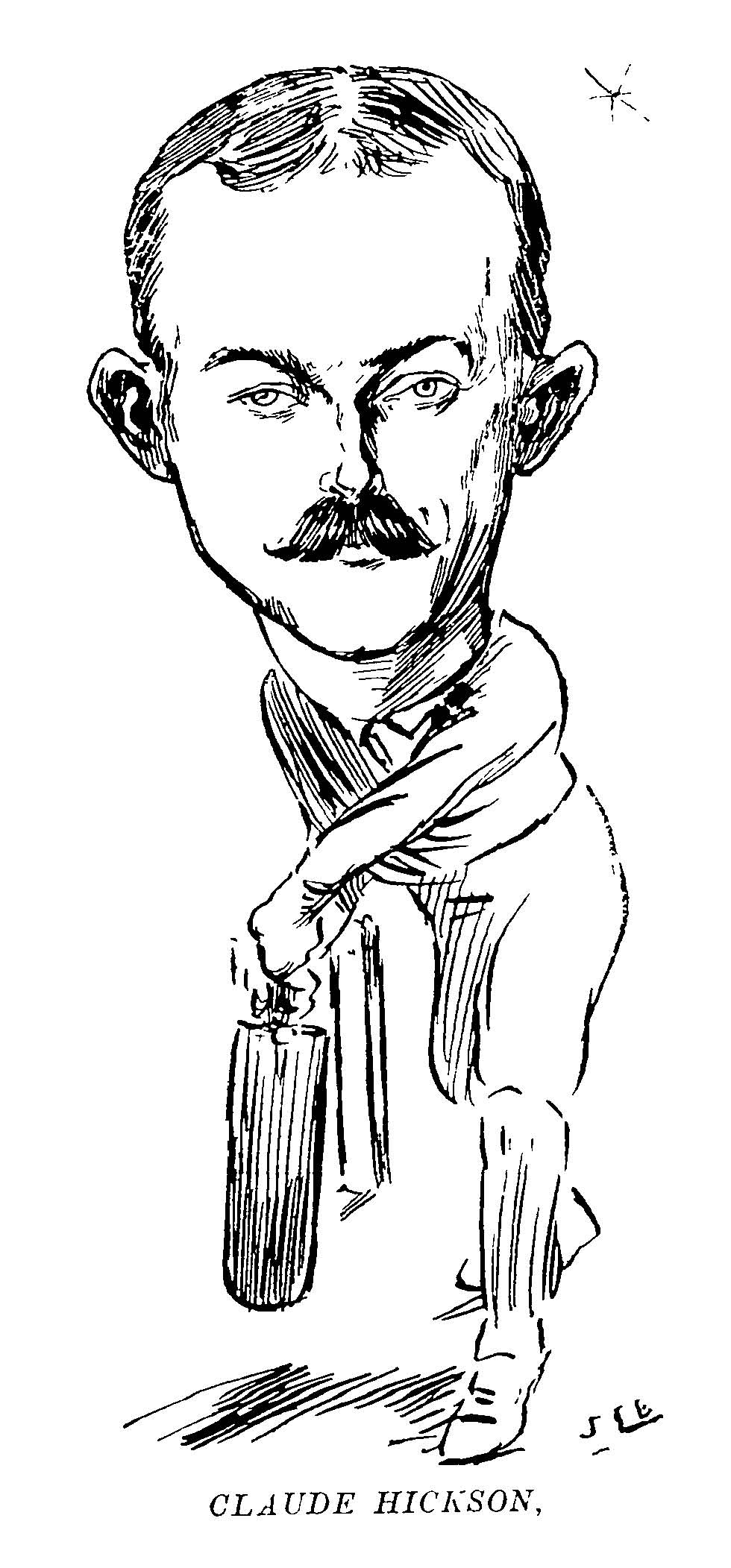
- 1909 portrait of Claude Hickson

Personal information
- Full name: Henry Claude Hickson
- Born: 4 September 1878; Wellington, New Zealand
- Died: 15 July 1948 (aged 69); Wellington, New Zealand
- Batting: Right-handed

Domestic team information
- Years: Team
- 1898/99–1911/12: Wellington

Career statistics
Competition	First-class
Matches	25
Runs scored	973
Batting average	21.62
100s/50s	1/2
Top score	135
Balls bowled	432
Wickets	10
Bowling average	22.50
5 wickets in innings	1
10 wickets in match	0
Best bowling	7/56
Catches/stumpings	26/–
- Source: Cricinfo, 23 January 2018

Henry Claude Hickson (4 September 1878 – 15 July 1948) was a New Zealand cricketer who played first-class cricket for Wellington from 1898 to 1912, and represented New Zealand in the days before New Zealand played Test cricket.

A batsman who sometimes opened the innings, Claude Hickson was described in 1899 as a steady batsman with a "splendid defence ... a veritable heart-breaker to the opposing trundlers" and a "capital field in the slips". He was selected to play for New Zealand against Lord Hawke's English team in 1902-03 after scoring 73 and 20 for Wellington against them. However, he was not successful, and New Zealand lost heavily.

In 1904-05 Hickson again performed well against the touring team, scoring 56 not out in Wellington's second innings to play the leading part in saving the match against the touring Australians. He played in the second of New Zealand's two matches against the Australians, but again without success.

Hickson made his only first-class century a year later when he scored a chanceless 135 against Auckland. "No chance could be urged against him, and he batted with a welcome freedom that ought to encourage him to abandon his somewhat precise methods in future." Wellington won by 214 runs.

Hickson was also a prominent hockey player who captained the Wellington representative team. He worked for the Pensions Department in Wellington.
