= Claude Morin =

Claude Morin may refer to:

- Claude Morin (PQ politician) (1929–2026), Parti Québécois Member of the Quebec legislature and Cabinet Member, 1976–1982
- Claude Morin (Beauce politician) (born 1953), ADQ Member of the Quebec legislature, 2007–2008
