= Claude Cummings =

Australian rules footballer (1917–1965)

Personal information
- Full name: Claude Cummings
- Born: 2 July 1917
- Died: 24 October 1965 (aged 48)
- Original team: South Richmond
- Height: 180 cm (5 ft 11 in)
- Weight: 89 kg (196 lb)

Playing career^{1}
Years	Club	Games (Goals)
1938	Richmond	1 (0)
- ^{1} Playing statistics correct to the end of 1938.

Claude Cummings (2 July 1917 – 24 October 1965) was a former Australian rules footballer who played with Richmond in the Victorian Football League (VFL).
