= Claude Craigie =

Scottish footballer

Personal information
- Full name: Claude Valentine Craigie
- Date of birth: 2 July 1886
- Place of birth: Montrose, Scotland
- Positions: Wing half; full back

Senior career*
Years	Team	Apps	(Gls)
1909–1913	Queen's Park	91	(6)
- * Club domestic league appearances and goals

Claude Valentine Craigie was a Scottish amateur footballer who played in the Scottish League for Queen's Park as a wing half and full back.

== Personal life ==
Craigie served as a bombardier in the Royal Garrison Artillery during the First World War.
