= Claude Hunt (Australian footballer) =

Australian rules footballer

Personal information
- Full name: Claude Melnotte Hunt
- Born: 6 December 1887; Kew, Victoria
- Died: 26 February 1959 (aged 71); Parkville, Victoria
- Original team: Doncaster

Playing career^{1}
Years	Club	Games (Goals)
1911	St Kilda	2 (0)
- ^{1} Playing statistics correct to the end of 1911.

Claude Melnotte Hunt (6 December 1887 – 26 February 1959) was an Australian rules footballer who played with St Kilda in the Victorian Football League (VFL).
