= Claude Larose =

Claude Larose may refer to:

- Claude Larose (ice hockey, born 1942), played primarily for the Montreal Canadiens and other teams of the NHL
- Claude Larose (ice hockey, born 1955), played primarily in the World Hockey Association
