= Pannier (disambiguation) =

A pannier is a storage container (basket, bag, or similar) used during transportation.

Pannier can also refer to:

- Pannier tank locomotive, a type of steam locomotive
- Pannier (clothing), an 18th-century undergarment

== People with the surname ==
- Anthony Pannier, French swimmer
- Rudolf Pannier (1897–1978), German SS officer
