= Claude Bremond =

French semiologist (1929–2021)

- Born: 1 March 1929
- Died: 20 January 2021 (aged 91); Bourg-la-Reine, France
- Occupation: Semiologist

Claude Bremond (1 March 1929 – 20 January 2021) was a French semiologist.

== Biography ==
In 1973, Bremond became the director of studies at the School for Advanced Studies in the Social Sciences, where he was also chair of the semiology department.

Bremond followed in the footsteps of Vladimir Propp in the sense that he believed in offering readers different paths to choose from in a story. He wanted readers to "let go of the arrow or hold it back, let it reach the target or make it miss it".

Claude Bremond died in Bourg-la-Reine on 20 January 2021.

== Publications ==
- Le message narratif (1964)
- La logique des possibles narratifs, Communications (1966)
- La Logique du récit (1973)
- L'exemplum (1982)
- Variations sur le thème (1988)
- Formes médiévales du conte merveilleux (1989)
- De Barthes à Balzac (1998)
- Les traductions françaises des "Mille et une nuits" (1996)
