= Claude Pickens =

American missionary and photographerer

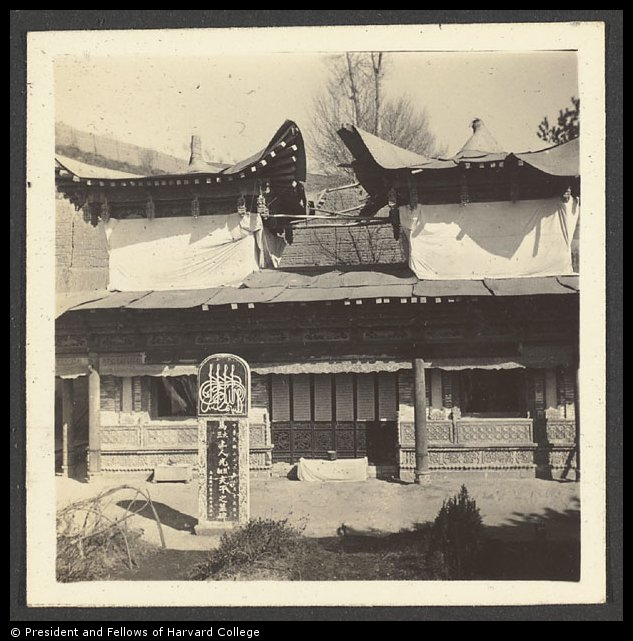
Tombstone of Master Ma in front of draped building, Hsüan Hua Kang, Kansu

Claude L. Pickens, Jr. (Chinese: 毕敬士, 1900 in Alexandria, Virginia – 1985 in Annisquam, Massachusetts) was, with his wife Elizabeth Zwemer Pickens, an American missionary in northwestern China. Working with the China Inland Mission, his surveys in 1933 and 1936 of the Hui and Tibetan peoples produced important photographic collections.
