= Académie Royale de Philatélie =

Belgian philatelic organization

The Académie Royale de Philatélie (Royal Academy of Philately) is a Belgian philatelic organization.

The academy was founded on March 25, 1966, by Lucien Herlant, Raoul Hubinont, and Gaston Trussart, president of the Royal Philatelic Society of Belgium. It is located in Brussels.

The academy consists of thirty titulary members and thirty corresponding members, all Belgian. Foreigners may be considered 'foreign correspondents'. New members are elected by sitting members of the academy.

A postage stamp was issued in 2006 by Bpost, the Belgian postal company, for the fortieth anniversary of the academy.
