= Claude Nicholson =

Claude Nicholson may refer to:

- Claude Nicholson (rugby league) (1892–1951), Australian rugby league player
- Claude Nicholson (British Army officer) (1898–1943), British Army brigadier of World War II
