= Claude Dauphin =

Claude Dauphin may refer to:

- Claude Dauphin (actor) (1903–1978), French actor
- Claude Dauphin (businessman) (1951–2015), French commodities trader
- Claude Dauphin (politician) (born 1953), lawyer and politician in Quebec, Canada
