= Nehemy Jean =

Nehemy Jean (1931–2007) was a Haitian painter and graphic artist. Born in Limbé, Jean worked as a graphic artist and studied portraiture. He painted murals at the Port-au-Prince International Airport. His works have been exhibited in Europe and the United States. He joined the Centre d'Art in 1947 and was active in the founding of the Foyer des Arts Plastique. Jean died in 2007.

== Sources ==
- Corbett, Bob. "Brief Biographies of Haitian Artists". Webster University. Archived from the original on 2006-12-31.
- Schutt-Ainé, Patricia (1994). Haiti: A Basic Reference Book. Miami, Florida: Librairie Au Service de la Culture. p. 113. ISBN 978-0-9638599-0-7.
