= Claude Windal =

French field hockey player

Personal information
- Nationality: French
- Born: 2 November 1939 (age 87) Dinard, France

Sport
- Sport: Field hockey

Claude Windal (born 2 November 1939 in Dinard) is a French field hockey player. He competed at the 1960 Summer Olympics and the 1968 Summer Olympics.
