= Claude Taylor =

Claude Taylor is the name of:

- Claude Taylor (transportation executive) (1925–2015), Canadian transportation executive
- Claude Taylor (rower) (1880–?), English rower
- Claude D. Taylor (1911–1970), real estate agent and political figure in New Brunswick
- Claude Taylor (cricketer) (1904–1966), English cricketer
- Claude A. Taylor (1902–1966), Chief Justice of the South Carolina Supreme Court

== See also ==
- Claude D. Taylor School
