= Claude Alphandéry =

French resistance member, banker and economist (1922–2024)

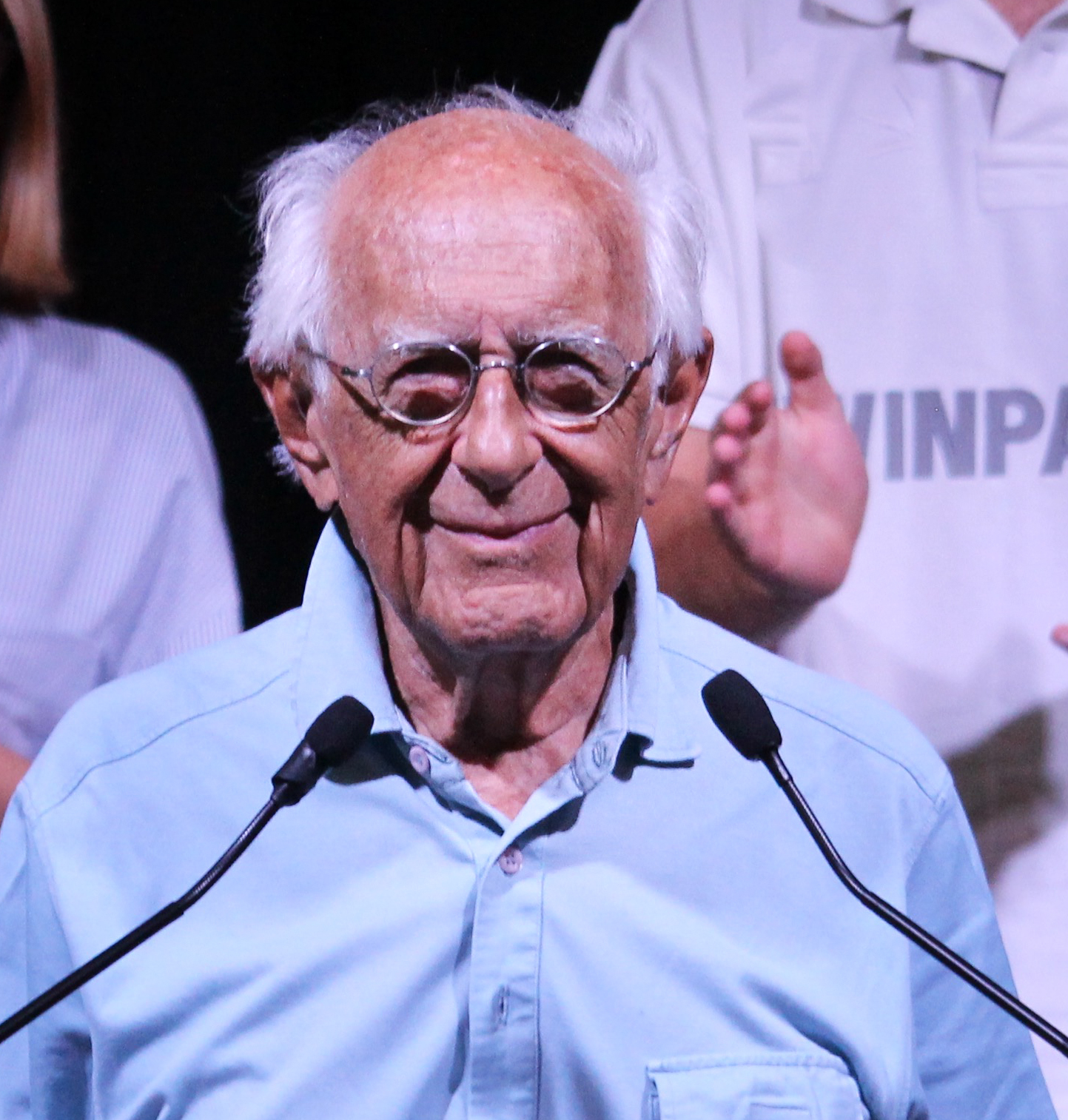
- Alphandéry in 2016
- Born: 27 November 1922; Paris, France
- Died: 25 March 2024 (aged 101); France
- Education: Lycée du Parc; École nationale d'administration
- Occupations: Banker; Economist

Claude Alphandéry (27 November 1922 – 25 March 2024) was a French Resistance member, banker and economist.

Alphandéry was founder and honorary chairman of Labo de l'ESS, a French think-tank working on the social economy, and honorary chairman of the Conseil national de l'insertion par l'activité économique. He died on 25 March 2024, at the age of 101.

== Early life ==
Claude Alphandéry was born in Paris on November 27, 1922, to Marie-Blanche Alphandéry, née Deneux, a doctor and president of a real estate company, and Claude Alphandéry, a Treasurer-Payeur General. He comes from a well-to-do Jewish family.

== Awards and honors ==
In 1947, he was awarded the Médaille de la Résistance française. In 2000, he was made a Grand officier de la Légion d'honneur. In 2013, he received the Grand-croix de l'ordre national du Mérite.

== Publications ==
- L'Amérique est-elle trop riche ?, Paris, Calmann-Lévy, 1960
- Pour une politique du logement, Paris, Seuil, 1965
- Nationaliser l'État (ouvrage collectif), Paris, Seuil, 1968
- Les prêts hypothécaires et leur marché, Paris, PUF, coll. « Que sais-je ? », No. 1326, 1976
- Les structures d'insertion par l'activité économique, La Documentation française, 1990
- Insertion sociale et économie, Paris, La Documentation française, 1993
- Vivre et résister, Paris, Descartes & Cie, 1999
- De la galère à l'entreprise, pour de nouvelles formes de financement solidaire (PDF) (in French). Paris: Éditions Charles Léopold Mayer. 2002. p. 117. ISBN 2-84377-057-2.
- Une si vive résistance, Paris, Rue de l'échiquier, 2011
- Nathalie Calmé ([préfaces de Claude Alphandéry et de Jean-Marc de Boni]; [postface de Bernard Ginisty]), Économie fraternelle et finance éthique : l'expérience de la NEF, Gap, Éditions Y. Michel, coll. « Économie », 2012, 300 p. ISBN 978-2-36429-027-3
- Une famille engagée : secrets et transmission, Paris, Éditions Odile Jacob, 2015, 105 p. ISBN 978-2-7381-3350-2
- Ouvrage collectif (27 May 2020). Résistons ensemble, pour que renaissent les jours heureux (PDF) (in French). Massot Éditions. pp. 15–20. ISBN 9782380352726 – via massot.com..
