= Claude Fuller =

Claude Fuller may refer to:

- Claude A. Fuller (1876–1968), lawyer, farmer and U.S. Representative from Arkansas
- Claude Fuller (entomologist) (1872–1928), entomologist in Australia and Southern Africa
