= Claude Roy =

Claude Roy may refer to:

- Claude Roy (physician) (born 1928), physician from Quebec, Canada
- Claude Roy (poet) (1915–1997), French poet and essayist
- Claude Roy (politician) (born 1952), politician from Quebec, Canada

== See also ==
- Claude Le Roy (born 1948), French football manager and former player
