= Claude Geoffroy =

Claude Geoffroy may refer to:

- Claude Joseph Geoffroy (1685–1752), French apothecary, chemist and botanist; younger brother of Étienne François Geoffroy
- Claude François Geoffroy (1729–1753), French chemist, discoverer of the chemical element bismuth
