= Claude Dugardin =

French field hockey player (1938–2023)

Personal information
- Nationality: French
- Born: 2 April 1938 Paris, France
- Died: 9 October 2023 (aged 85) Houdan, France

Sport
- Sport: Field hockey

Claude Dugardin (2 April 1938 – 9 October 2023) was a French field hockey player. He competed in the men's tournament at the 1960 Summer Olympics. Dugardin died in Houdan on 9 October 2023, at the age of 85.
