= Claude Le Pen =

French economist (1948–2020)

- Born: 17 February 1948; Madagascar
- Died: 6 April 2020 (aged 72); Paris, France
- Education: HEC Paris
- Occupation: Economist

Claude Le Pen (17 February 1948 – 6 April 2020) was a French economist. He specialized in health economics.

== Biography ==
Le Pen earned a doctorate in economics in 1980. He was a professor first at University of Rennes from 1981 to 1984, then at the Paris Dauphine University.

A graduate of HEC Paris, Le Pen held a doctorate in the history and epidemiology of economic thought and a doctorate of economics. He was an associate of the Faculté des sciences économiques.

Claude Le Pen died on 6 April 2020 at the age of 72 following a long illness.
