= Claude Canaway =

Australian rules footballer (1911–1989)

Personal information
- Full name: Raymond Claude Canaway
- Born: 26 October 1911; Fitzroy, Victoria
- Died: 19 January 1989 (aged 77)

Playing career
Years	Club	Games (Goals)
1933	Fitzroy	1 (0)

Raymond Claude Canaway (26 October 1911 – 19 January 1989) was an Australian rules footballer. He played one game for Fitzroy in the Victorian Football League (VFL) in 1933. This match was the Round 15 clash against Melbourne at the Melbourne Cricket Ground.
