= Claude Hardy =

French linguist, mathematician, and lawyer (1604–1678)

- Born: 1604
- Died: April 5, 1678 (aged 73–74)
- Other name: Antoine Vasset (Pseudonym)
- Known for: Translating the works of Erasmus and Euclid, among others
- Spouse: Perrette Presche
- Scientific career
- Fields: Mathematics, Linguistics

Claude Hardy (1604 – 5 April 1678) was a French linguist, mathematician, and lawyer known for translating the works of Erasmus and Euclid into 36 different languages. He was considered one of the strongest mathematicians of his time.

== Early life ==
Hardy was born in 1604 to Sébastien Hardy the seigneur of Estour and Tabaize in Quinquempoix, France. In 1610 he moved to St Honoré in the parish of St Germain de l'Auxerrois.

== Career ==
Hardy's first publication was published in 1613 at the age of nine. It was a translation of Erasmus' work titled De la civilité morale des enfants. He went on to publish another translation the following year, this time of a work of poetry by Michel Verin. By 1625 Hardy had completed his education and was working as a lawyer in Paris where he took a job working for the Parlement of Paris. While he worked there he published Euclidis Data, & Marini Philosophi in Data Euclidis commentarius graece & latine. A year later, he was promoted to be a counselor of Paris' court of justice. He later studied with Claude Mydorge, Pierre de Fermat, and René Descartes. He discussed mathematical ideas with them and aided them in translating their works. In 1630, he began publishing under the pseudonym of Antoine Vasset. His first work under this name was a translation of François Viète's book on Algebra.

His first published original works were two papers on the duplication of the cube, titled Examen and Refutation, they were published in 1630 and 1638 respectively. He later studied chemistry with Annibal Barlet.

== Personal life ==
In 1622, Hardy married Perrette Presche.
