= Claude Guiguet =

French modern pentathlete

Personal information
- Born: 28 September 1947 (age 78)

Sport
- Sport: Modern pentathlon

Claude Guiguet (born 28 September 1947) is a French modern pentathlete. He competed at the 1976 Summer Olympics.
