= Claude Panier =

French politician

Claude Panier (13 December 1912 – 20 February 1990) was a French politician.

Panier was born in Luxeuil-les-Bains. He represented the Radical Party in the National Assembly from 1956 to 1958.
