= Claude Porter White =

American author and composer

Claude Porter White (April 30, 1907 – March 16, 1975) was an American author and the composer of three operas, as well as other music. She was born in Cleburne, Texas, to Claude Scott Porter and Reverend David Knox Porter. After graduating from Southwestern University, she did graduate work in public school music at Northwestern University, and studied at the Aspen Music School and a composers' symposium in Dallas, Texas. On June 3, 1934, she married Claude L. White. They settled in Corsicana, Texas, and had two daughters.

White edited and published The Texas Opera News, which she began in 1973. She published a book of poetry and was listed in the International Who's Who in Poetry in 1974.

White organized the Tune 'N Fork Club in Corsicana and was a life member of the Texas Federation of Music Clubs and the National Federation of Music Clubs. She chaired the Texas club's manuscript society and its organization of adult composers. The Claude Porter White Fund for Young Composers was established following her death in 1975.

White composed music for orchestra, harp, piano, voice, and at least one ballet. Her publications included:

== Books ==
- Fruits of My Spirit (poetry)

== Operas ==
- Genius
- Grass Roots
- Solomon's Portico
