= Claude Treglown =

English cricketer

Personal information
- Full name: Claude Jesse Helby Treglown
- Born: 13 February 1893; Herne Bay, Kent, England
- Died: 7 May 1980 (aged 87); Worthing, Sussex, England
- Batting: Right-handed
- Role: Batsman

Domestic team information
- Years: Team
- 1922–1928: Essex

Career statistics
Competition	FC
Matches	34
Runs scored	792
Batting average
100s/50s
Top score
Balls bowled
Wickets
Bowling average
5 wickets in innings
10 wickets in match
Best bowling
Catches/stumpings
- Source: Cricinfo, 21 July 2013

Claude Treglown (13 February 1893 – 7 May 1980) was an English cricketer. He played for Essex between 1922 and 1928.
