= Claudia (given name) =

- Pronunciation: Italian: [ˈklaudja]
- Gender: Female

Origin
- Origin: Latin
- Meaning: Lameness or enclosure
- Region of origin: Italy

Other names
- Alternative spelling: Klaudia, Cláudia
- Related names: Claudius, Claude, Claudine, Claudiu, Claudio

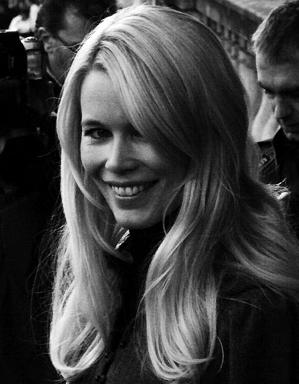
Claudia Schiffer in London

Claudia is a female given name equivalent to Claudius or Claudio. In Portuguese, it is accented Cláudia. A variant and cognate form is Klaudia. It was originally used to refer to any woman who belonged to the ancient Roman Claudia gens. Claudia is a common name in countries that speak Germanic languages and Romance languages.

== Given name ==
- Claudia of Chalon (1498–1521), noblewoman
- Claudia Felicitas of Austria (1653–1676), Holy Roman Empress

=== A–E ===
- Cláudia Abreu (born 1970), Brazilian actress
- Claudia Acerenza (born 1966), Uruguayan sprinter
- Claudia Acuña (born 1971), Chilean musical artist
- Cláudia Aguiar (born 1982), Portuguese politician
- Claudia Elena Aguila (born 1972), Mexican politician
- Claudia Albertario (born 1977), Argentine model, vedette and actress
- Claudia von Alemann (born 1943), German filmmaker
- Claudia Alende (born 1993), Brazilian actress and model
- Claudia Alexander (1959–2015), NASA scientist and project manager
- Claudia Allen (born 1954), American playwright and educator
- Claudia Álvarez (born 1981), Mexican actress
- Claudia Alvarez (artist), Mexican American artist
- Claudia Alvariño Díaz (born 1987), Cuban actress
- Claudia Alvera (born 1966), Italian curler
- Claudia Amengual (born 1969), Uruguayan writer and translator
- Claudia Amura (born 1970), Argentine chess player
- Claudia Anaya Mota (born 1979), Mexican politician
- Claudia Ancapán (born 1976), Chilean midwife and transsexual activist
- Cláudia André, Portuguese politician
- Claudia Andreatti (born 1987), Miss Italia 2006
- Claudia Andujar (born 1931), Brazilian photographer
- Claudia Antonia (c. 30–66), daughter of Emperor Claudius
- Claudia Aravena (born 1968), Chilean visual artist
- Claudia Arce (born 1991), Bolivian actress, singer and model
- Claudia Baccarini (born 1910), Italian centenarian
- Claudia Balderrama (born 1983), Bolivian racewalker
- Claudia Balducci (born 1967), American politician
- Claudia Bandion-Ortner (born 1966), Austrian judge and politician
- Claudia Bär (1980–2015), German canoer
- Claudia Barainsky (born 1965), German operatic soprano
- Claudia Barattini (born 1960), Chilean politician
- Claudia Barrenechea (born 1977), Chilean biathlete
- Claudia Barrett (1929–2021), American actress
- Claudia Barrionuevo (born 1991), Argentine model and beauty pageant titleholder
- Claudia Barth (born 1975), German rower
- Claudia Basrawi (born 1962), German actress and writer
- Claudia Bassols (born 1979), Spanish actress
- Claudia Pía Baudracco (1970–2012), Argentinian activist
- Claudia Beamish (born 1952), Scottish politician
- Claudia Beer (born 1993), German curler
- Claudia Belderbos (born 1985), Dutch rower
- Claudia Belk (1937–2017), American judge, lawyer and philanthropist
- Claudia Bellotto (born 1960), Argentine swimmer
- Claudia Beni (born 1986), Croatian singer
- Claudia Benitez-Nelson, chemical oceanographer and researcher
- Cláudia Bento, Portuguese politician
- Claudia Bernardi, Argentine artist
- Claudia Bernazza (born 1960), Argentine teacher and politician
- Claudia Biene (born 1973), German Paralympic athlete
- Claudia R. Binder, Swiss-Canadian-Colombian researcher
- Claudia Bistrian (born 1996), Romanian footballer
- Claudia Bitrán, Chilean-American artist
- Claudia Black (born 1972), Australian actress
- Claudia Blasberg (born 1975), German rower
- Claudia Blum (born 1948), Colombian psychologist and politician
- Claudia Bobocea (born 1992), Romanian middle-distance runner
- Claudia Bockner (born 1972), German diver
- Claudia Elizabeth Bojórquez (born 1970), Mexican politician
- Claudia Bokel (born 1973), German épée fencer
- Claudia Böse, British painter
- Claudia Bouvette, musical artist
- Claudia Brant (born 1966), Argentine musical artist
- Claudia Brassard-Riebesehl (born 1975), Malaysian-born Canadian basketball player
- Claudia de Breij (born 1975), Dutch DJ, singer and comedian
- Claudia Brind-Woody (born 1955), American business executive
- Claudia Brokof (born 1977), German canoeist
- Claudia Brücken (born 1963), German singer and songwriter
- Claudia Brush Kidwell (born 1941), American historian
- Claudia Bryar (1918–2011), American actress
- Claudia Maria Buch, German economist
- Claudia Bühlmann, Swiss bobsledder
- Claudia Bunge (born 1999), New Zealand footballer
- Claudia Burkart (born 1980), Argentine field hockey player
- Claudia Burr (born 1968), Chilean actress
- Claudia Burton Bradley (1909–1967), Australian orthopedist, pediatrician, pharmacist and researcher
- Claudia Butenuth (1946–2016), German film and TV actress
- Claudia Caballero Chávez (born 1982), Mexican politician
- Claudia Cabezas (born 2001), Spanish footballer
- Claudia Cagnina (born 1997), Peruvian footballer
- Claudia Calderon, Colombian pianist and composer
- Claudia Capitolina, 1st-century princess of Commagene
- Claudia Carawan (born 1959), American singer-songwriter and pianist
- Claudia Card (1940–2015), American philosopher
- Claudia Cardinale (1938–2025), Italian actress
- Claudia Carlstedt, American actress
- Claudia Carroll, Irish author and actress
- Claudia Casabianca (born 1960), Argentine tennis player
- Claudia Casper, Canadian writer
- Claudia Cassidy (1899–1996), American arts critic
- Claudia Mabel Castro, Chilean consistent
- Claudia Catani (born 1969), Italian actress and voice artist
- Claudia Cazacu, Romanian DJ, record producer and remixer
- Claudia Celedón (born 1966), Chilean actress
- Claudia Cenedese, Italian oceanographer
- Cláudia Cepeda (born 1967), Brazilian actress
- Claudia Cerutti (born 1972), Italian modern pentathlete
- Claudia Cesarini (born 1986), Italian modern pentathlete
- Cláudia Chabalgoity (born 1971), Brazilian tennis player
- Claudia Chamorro Barrios, Nicaraguan diplomat
- Claudia Chan Shaw, Australian fashion designer and TV presenter
- Claudia Chase, American politician
- Claudia Chender (born 1976), Canadian politician
- Claudia Chiper (born 1995), Moldovan footballer
- Claudia Chmielowska (born 1998), Polish artistic gymnast
- Claudia Cholakian (born 1996), Armenian footballer
- Claudia Christian (born 1965), American actress
- Claudia Crysis, Romano-British woman
- Claudia Church (born 1962), American country singer
- Cláudia Cianci (born 1996), Portuguese tennis player
- Claudia Ciardone, Argentine model, theatre actress and vedette
- Claudia Ciccotti (born 1994), Italian footballer
- Claudia Ciesla (born 1987), German model and actress
- Claudia Cislek (born 1990), German singer
- Claudia Clare, British ceramicist and writer
- Claudia Clevenger (born 1955), American swimmer
- Claudia Clopath, neuroscientist
- Claudia Coari, Quechua politician in Peru
- Claudia Cobizev (1905–1995), Moldovan sculptor
- Claudia Cockburn (1933–1998), American-British disability activist
- Claudia Cogan, American comedian
- Claudia Cohen (1950–2007), American gossip columnist, socialite and TV reporter
- Claudia Colom (born 1998), Spanish artistic gymnast
- Claudia Comte (born 1983), Swiss artist
- Claudia Conserva (born 1974), Chilean actress, model and presenter
- Claudia Constantinescu, Romanian handballer
- Claudia Conte, Spanish athletics competitor
- Claudia Coppola (born 1994), Italian tennis player
- Claudia Corichi García (born 1974), Mexican politician
- Claudia Maria Cornwall, Canadian writer and journalist
- Claudia Corsini (born 1977), Italian modern pentathlete
- Claudia Coslovich (born 1972), Italian javelin thrower
- Claudia Cowan (born 1963), American journalist
- Claudia Cretti (born 1996), Italian cyclist
- Claudia Cron, American actress and model
- Cláudia Cruz, Brazilian journalist
- Claudia Cruz (born 1986), Dominican Republic model
- Claudia Cruz Santiago (born 1967), Mexican politician
- Cláudia Cruz Santos, Portuguese academic and politician
- Claudia Cuic (born 1989), Romanian basketball player
- Claudia Cummins (born 1995), South African artistic gymnast
- Claudia Czado, German statistician
- Claudia Dabda (born 2001), Cameroonian footballer
- Claudia Dain (1956–2021), American author of romance novels
- Claudia Dammert (1949–2017), Peruvian actress and comedian
- Claudia Dasca Romeu (born 1994), Spanish swimmer
- Claudia Dávila, Peruvian lawyer and politician
- Claudia De la Cruz, American community organizer and activist
- Claudia Delgadillo González (born 1972), Mexican politician
- Claudia Dell (1909–1977), American actress, dancer and showgirl
- Claudia DeMonte, American sculptor
- Claudia Dey, Canadian writer
- Claudia Dickey, American professional soccer player
- Claudia Dobles Camargo (born 1980), Costa Rican architect and urban
- Claudia Doumit (born 1991), Australian actress
- Claudia Drake (1918–1997), American actress and singer
- Claudia Draxl, German physicist
- Claudia Dreher (born 1971), German runner
- Claudia Durastanti (born 1984), Italian journalist and writer
- Claudia Durst Johnson, literary scholar
- Claudia Eckert (disambiguation), several people
- Claudia Eder (born 1948), German opera singer
- Claudia Eisinger (born 1984), German actress
- Claudia Emerson (1957–2014), American academic, writer and poet

=== F–M ===
- Claudia Fährenkemper (born 1959), German photographer
- Claudia Fajardo (born 1985), Honduran sport shooter
- Claudia Faniello (born 1988), Maltese singer
- Claudia Fassaert (born 1970), Belgian Olympic dressage rider
- Claudia Felser (born 1962), German solid state chemist and materials scientist
- Claudia Fernández (born 1976), Uruguayan model, actress and TV personality
- Claudia Fernández (footballer), Spanish footballer
- Claudia Fernández Valdivia (born 1988), former Second Lady of Bolivia
- Claudia Ferraris (born 1988), Italian model
- Claudia Ferri, Canadian actress
- Claudia Fischbach, German biophysicist
- Claudia Fischer (born 1981), Austrian curler
- Claudia Fleming, American dessert chef
- Claudia Florenti, Italian opera singer
- Claudia Florentino (born 1998), Spanish footballer
- Claudia Fontaine (1960–2018), English singer
- Claudia Fontán (born 1966), Argentine actress
- Claudia Fortin (born 1973), Honduran swimmer
- Claudia Fragapane (born 1997), British artistic gymnast
- Claudia Franco (born 1975), Spanish swimmer
- Claudia Friedl (born 1960), Swiss politician
- Claudia Fritsche (born 1952), Liechtenstein diplomat
- Claudia Gabel (born 1975), American writer
- Claudia Gallardo, Chilean taekwondo practitioner
- Claudia Galli (born 1978), Swedish actress
- Claudia Gamon (born 1988), Austrian politician
- Claudia Garde (born 1966), German film director and screenwriter
- Claudia Geiringer, New Zealand law professor
- Claudia Gerhardt (born 1966), German athletics competitor
- Claudia Gerini (born 1971), Italian actress and showgirl
- Claudia Gesell (born 1977), German middle-distance runner
- Claudia Giannotti (1937–2020), Italian actress
- Claudia Giordani (born 1955), Italian alpine skier
- Claudia Giovine (born 1990), Italian tennis player
- Claudia di Girolamo (born 1956), Chilean actress
- Claudia Goldin (born 1946), American economist
- Claudia Gonson (born 1968), American drummer
- Claudia Liliana González, Colombian actress
- Claudia L. Gordon, American attorney
- Cláudia Graner (born 1974), Brazilian water polo player
- Claudia Gray (born 1970), American author
- Claudia Green, New Zealand cricketer
- Claudia Griffith (1950–2018), American nurse and politician
- Claudia Grigorescu (born 1968), Romanian fencer
- Claudia Grinnell, British organist and choir director
- Claudia Grundmann (born 1976), German ice hockey player
- Claudia Guri (born 1995), Andorran athlete
- Claudia Hammond (born 1971), British author and journalist
- Claudia Haro, American actress
- Claudia Hart (born 1955), American artist
- Claudia Bernadine Elisabeth Hartert (1863–1958), German-British ornithologist
- Claudia van den Heiligenberg (born 1985), Dutch footballer
- Claudia Heill (1982–2011), Austrian judoka
- Claudia Hellmann (1931–2017), German opera singer
- Claudia Hempel (born 1958), German swimmer
- Claudia Hengst (born 1969), German Paralympic swimmer
- Claudia Henkel (born 1983), South African beauty queen
- Claudia Hernández (disambiguation), several people
- Claudia Herrera, Chilean footballer
- Claudia Heunis (born 1989), South African hurdler
- Claudia Hiersche (born 1977), German actress
- Claudia Hill, German interdisciplinary artist
- Claudia Hinojosa, Mexican academic and activist
- Claudia Höbartner, Austrian-born chemist
- Claudia Hoffmann (born 1982), German sprinter
- Claudia Hollingsworth (born 2005), Australian athlete
- Claudia Holzner (born 1994), Canadian synchronized swimmer
- Claudia Huckle, British operatic contralto
- Claudia Hufnagl (born 1996), Austrian swimmer
- Claudia Hunt (born 1950), Canadian canoeist
- Claudia Hürtgen (born 1971), German race driver
- Claudia Hüttenmoser (born 1967), Swiss wheelchair curler and Paralympian
- Claudia Isăilă (born 1973), Romanian javelin thrower
- Claudia Islas (born 1946), Mexican actress
- Claudia Jennings (1949–1979), American model and actress
- Claudia Jessie (born 1989), English actress
- Cláudia Jimenez (1958–2022), Brazilian actress
- Claudia Johnson (disambiguation), several people
- Claudia Jones (1915–1964), Trinidad-born journalist and activist
- Claudia J. Jordan, First Black female judge
- Claudia Jordan (born 1973), American model
- Claudia Jung (born 1964), German singer and politician
- Claudia Kahr (born 1955), Australian judge
- Claudia Karvan (born 1972), Australian actress
- Claudia Katz, American animation producer
- Claudia Kauffman (born 1959), American politician
- Claudia Kawas, American neurologist
- Claudia Keelan, American poet, writer and professor
- Claudia Kemfert (born 1968), German economist
- Claudia J. Kennedy (born 1947), United States Army general
- Claudia Kessler, German engineer
- Claudia Kim (born 1985), South Korean actress
- Claudia Klein (born 1971), German footballer
- Claudia Klüppelberg, German statistician
- Claudia Kogachi, Japanese-born New Zealand artist
- Claudia Kohde-Kilsch (born 1963), German tennis player
- Claudia Kolb (born 1949), American swimmer
- Claudia Koll (born 1965), Italian actress and missionary
- Claudia Koonz, American historian of Nazi Germany
- Claudia Koster (born 1992), Dutch cyclist
- Claudia Kreuzig Grinnell, German-American poet
- Claudia Kristofics-Binder (born 1961), Austrian figure skater
- Claudia Kriz (born 1957), German archer
- Claudia La Bianca, American artist and filmmaker
- Claudia La Gatta (born 1979), Venezuelan actress and model
- Claudia La Rocco, New York Times dance critic
- Claudia Lamb (born 1963), American actress
- Claudia Langenberg, German epidemiologist
- Claudia von Lanken (born 1977), German footballer and manager
- Claudia Lapacó (born 1940), Argentine actress
- Claudia Lapp, German poet
- Claudia Larochelle, Canadian journalist and radio host
- Claudia Lars (1899–1974), Salvadoran poet
- Claudia Lau (born 1992), Hong Kong competitive swimmer
- Claudia Lauper Bushman (born 1934), American historian and editor
- Claudia Lawrence (born 1974), British missing person
- Claudia Leach (1911–2009), Australian teacher and politician
- Claudia Ledesma Abdala (born 1974), Argentine politician
- Claudia Lee (born 1996), American actress
- Claudia Lee Hae-in (born 1933), South Korean poet
- Claudia Leenders (born 1994), Dutch canoeist
- Claudia Lehmann (born 1973), German cyclist
- Claudia Leistner (born 1965), German figure skater
- Claudia Leitte (born 1980), Brazilian singer
- Claudia Leistner (born 1965), German figure skater
- Claudia Lennear (born 1946), American singer
- Claudia Letizia (born 1979), Italian actress, dancer and singer
- Claudia Levy (1944–2021), American journalist and Union activist
- Claudia Lichtenberg (born 1985), German cyclist
- Cláudia Lima (born 1996), Portuguese footballer
- Claudia Lindsey (born 1936), American operatic soprano
- Claudia Linnhoff-Popien, German computer scientist
- Claudia Lizaldi (born 1978), Mexican anchor, actress and model
- Claudia Llosa (born 1976), Peruvian film director, screenwriter and film producer
- Claudia Lokar (born 1964), German long-distance runner
- Claudia Lonow (born 1963), American actress
- Claudia Losch (born 1960), German shot putter
- Claudia Lösch (born 1988), Austrian alpine skier
- Claudia Lössl, German actress
- Claudia Lumor (born 1980), Ghanaian publisher
- Claudia Lux (born 1950), German librarian
- Claudia Mac-Lean, Chilean constituent
- Claudia MacDonald (born 1996), England international rugby union player
- Cláudia Magno (1958–1994), Brazilian actress and dancer
- Claudia Mahler, Austrian academic
- Claudia Mahnke, German operatic mezzo-soprano
- Claudia Marcella Major, 1st-century BC noblewoman and eldest daughter of Octavia Minor
- Claudia Malvenuto (born 1965), Italian mathematician
- Claudia Malzahn (born 1983), German judoka
- Claudia Mandia (born 1992), Italian archer
- Claudia Mandrysch (born 1969), German footballer
- Claudia Martín (born 1989), Mexican actress
- Claudia Guadalupe Martinez, American children's author
- Claudia Martínez (born 2008), Paraguayan footballer
- Claudia Märtl (born 1954), German historian
- Claudia Marx (born 1978), German sprinter
- Claudia Mason (born 1973), American model and actress
- Claudia Massari (born 1966), German figure skater
- Claudia Maté, post-internet artist
- Claudia Maurer Zenck, German musicologist
- Claudia Mazzà, professor of biomechanics
- Claudia McNeil (1917–1993), American actress
- Claudia Meier, German Paralympic athlete
- Claudia Meier Volk, American politician
- Claudia Melchers (born 1969), Dutch kidnap victim
- Claudia Metzner (born 1966), German long-distance runner
- Claudia Michelsen (born 1969), German actress
- Claudia Mijangos (born 1956), Mexican murder ex-convict
- Claudia S. Miller, author and immunologist
- Claudia Mills (born 1954), American author and academic
- Claudia Miranda (born 1968), Chilean professional dancer
- Claudia Mix, Chilean politician
- Claudia Mo (born 1957), Hong Kong journalist and politician
- Claudia Moatti (born 1954), French historian specialised in Roman Studies
- Claudia Molitor, English-German composer
- Claudia Moll, German politician
- Cláudia Monteiro (born 1961), Brazilian tennis player
- Claudia Montero (1962–2021), Argentine composer
- Claudia Mora, geoscientist
- Claudia Moreno, Venezuelan beauty pageant titleholder
- Claudia Morgado Escanilla, Chilean-Canadian filmmaker
- Claudia Morgan (1911–1974), American actress
- Claudia Mori (born 1944), Italian actress, singer and TV producer
- Claudia Moro (born 1985), Spanish model and beauty pageant winner
- Claudia Motta (born 1971), Mexican voice actress
- Claudia Muciño (born 1971), Mexican tennis player
- Claudia Müller (disambiguation), several people
- Claudia Muzio (1889–1936), Italian operatic soprano
- Claudia Myers, American screenwriter, director and producer

=== N–Z ===
- Claudia Natasia, Indonesian novelist
- Claudia Ndaba, South African politician
- Claudia Nechita (born 1993), Romanian boxer
- Claudia Neuhauser, American mathematician
- Cláudia das Neves (born 1975), Brazilian basketball player
- Claudia Nicoleitzik (born 1989), German Paralympic athlete
- Claudia Nicula (born 1973), Romanian sprint canoer
- Claudia Noack (born 1961), German rower
- Claudia Nogueira (born 1969), Chilean politician
- Claudia Nolte (born 1966), German politician
- Claudia Novelo (born 1965), Mexican swimmer
- Claudia Nystad (born 1978), German skier
- Claudia Ochoa Félix (1987–2019), Mexican social Narcotraficante
- Claudia Octavia, wife of Emperor Nero
- Claudia O'Doherty (born 1983), Australian comedienne and actress
- Cláudia Ohana (born 1963), Brazilian actress and singer
- Claudia Olivetti, American economist
- Claudia Olsen (1896–1980), Norwegian politician
- Claudia Orange (born 1938), New Zealand historian
- Claudia Ordaz, Texas legislator
- Claudia Beatriz Ormachea (born 1959), Argentine politician and psychologist
- Claudia Ortiz
  - Claudia Ortiz de Zevallos Cano (born 1981), Peruvian model
  - Claudia Ortiz (politician) (Claudia Mercedes Ortiz Menjívar; born 1987), Salvadoran politician
- Claudia Österheld (born 1968), German airframe engineer
- Claudia Palacios (born 1977), Colombian journalist
- Claudia M. Palena, Argentine-American immunologist and cancer researcher
- Claudia Pandolfi (born 1974), Italian actress
- Cláudia Pascoal (born 1994), Portuguese singer
- Claudia Pascual (born 1972), Chilean politician and social anthropologist
- Claudia Pasini (1939–2015), Italian fencer
- Claudia Pasquale (born 1963), Swiss tennis player
- Claudia Pavel (born 1984), Romanian singer
- Claudia Pavlovich Arellano (born 1969), Mexican politician and lawyer
- Claudia Payton (born 1998), Swedish sprinter
- Claudia Paz (1920–2015), Chilean actress
- Claudia Pechstein (born 1972), German speed skater
- Claudia Peczinka (born 1968), Swiss synchronized swimmer
- Claudia Pereira (born 1976), Brazilian politician
- Claudia Petracchi (born 1966), Italian softball player
- Claudia Peus, German leadership scholar and university manager
- Clàudia Pina (born 2001), Spanish footballer
- Claudia Pinna (born 1977), Italian long-distance runner
- Claudia Pinza Bozzolla (1925–2017), American opera soprano
- Claudia Pizarro (born 1964), Chilean politician
- Claudia Plakolm (born 1994), Austrian politician
- Claudia Polini, Italian-American mathematician
- Claudia Poll (born 1972), Costa Rican swimmer
- Claudia Pond Eyley (born 1946), New Zealand artist and filmmaker
- Claudia Porwik (born 1968), German tennis player
- Claudia Potter (1881–1970), American physician
- Claudia Powers (born 1950), American politician
- Claudia Presăcan (born 1979), Romanian gymnast
- Claudia Previn, American singer, musician, editor and graphic artist
- Claudia Puig (born 1956), American journalist
- Claudia Quigley Murphy (1863–1941), journalist, economic consultant, advisory counsel, author
- Claudia Raffelhüschen (born 1968), German politician
- Cláudia Raia (born 1966), Brazilian actress
- Claudia Ramírez (born 1964), Mexican actress
- Claudia Rankine (born 1963), American poet, essayist and playwright
- Claudia Rapp, German scholar
- Claudia Ratti, Italian nuclear physicist
- Claudia Rauschenbach (born 1984), German pair skater
- Claudia Razzeto (born 1991), Peruvian tennis player
- Claudia Razzi (born 1962), Italian voice actress
- Claudia Reiche (born 1951), German diver
- Claudia Reichler (born 1963), German footballer
- Claudia Reinhardt, German photographer
- Claudia Reséndiz (born 1994), Mexican volleyball player
- Claudia de Rham (born 1978), theoretical cosmologist
- Claudia Riechsteiner (born 1986), Swiss ice hockey player
- Claudia Riera (born 1996), Andorran actress
- Claudia Riner, 20th-century American politician
- Claudia Rivas (born 1989), Mexican triathlete
- Claudia Rivero (born 1986), Peruvian badminton player
- Claudia Roden (born 1936), British writer and cultural anthropologist
- Claudia Rodríguez (born 1960), Venezuelan footballer
- Claudia Rodríguez de Castellanos (born 1960), Evangelical pastor and Colombian politician
- Claudia Rodríguez de Guevara (born 1980/1981), Acting President of El Salvador
- Claudia Romani (born 1982), Italian American model
- Claudia Rompen (born 1997), Dutch handball player
- Claudia Rosencrantz (born 1959), British TV executive and journalist
- Claudia Rosett (1955–2023), American journalist
- Claudia Rosiny (born 1960), German academic
- Claudia Roth (born 1955), German politician
- Claudia Roth (paleobiologist) (born 1958), German paleobiologist
- Claudia Roth Pierpont, American journalist
- Claudia Rouaux (born 1963), French politician
- Claudia Rowe (born 1966), journalist working for The Seattle Times
- Claudia Rueda, Colombian picture book author and illustrator
- Claudia Rufina, women of British descent
- Claudia Ruiz Massieu (born 1972), Mexican lawyer and politician
- Claudia Rusca (1593–1676), Italian composer, singer and organist
- Claudia Russell, American singer-songwriter
- Claudia Russo, Italian beauty pageant contestant
- Claudia Sagastizábal, applied mathematician
- Claudia Sahm, American economist
- Claudia Salas (born 1994), Spanish actress
- Claudia Salazar Jiménez (born 1976), Peruvian writer
- Claudia Salinas (born 1983), Mexican model and actress
- Claudia Salman (born 1986), German heptathlete
- Claudia Salvarani (born 1975), Italian middle-distance runner
- Claudia Sánchez Juárez (born 1979), Mexican politician
- Claudia Sangiorgi Dalimore, Australian filmmaker
- Cláudia Santos (born 1977), Brazilian adaptive rower
- Claudia Emmanuela Santoso (born 2000), Indonesian singer
- Claudia Sarne (born 1969), British-American composer
- Claudia Scharmann (born 1966), German rhythmic gymnast
- Claudia Scheunemann (born 2009), Indonesian footballer
- Claudia Schiess (born 1989), Ecuadorian beauty queen
- Claudia Schiffer (born 1970), German model and actress
- Claudia Schmidt
  - Claudia Schmidt (musician) (born 1953), American musician
  - Claudia Schmidt (politician) (born 1963), Austrian politician and educator
- Claudia Schmidtke (born 1966), German politician
- Claudia Schmied (born 1959), Austrian politician
- Claudia Schneider (born 1951), American rower
- Claudia Schoppmann (born 1958), German historian and author
- Claudia Schramm (born 1975), German bobsledder
- Claudia Schreiber (born 1958), German journalist and author
- Claudia Scott (born 1957), Norwegian/British musical artist
- Claudia Scott (academic) (born 1945), American New Zealand academic
- Claudia Schubert, German mezzo-soprano concert singer
- Claudia Schüler (1987–2023), Chilean field hockey player
- Claudia Serpieri, Italian technical diver and depth record holder
- Claudia Serrano (born 1957), Chilean politician
- Claudia Sessa (1570–1617), Italian composer
- Claudia Shear (born 1962), American actress and playwright
- Claudia Sheinbaum (born 1962), scientist, Mayor of Mexico City and 66th President of Mexico
- Claudia Silva
  - Cláudia da Silva, Brazilian volleyball player
  - Claudia Silva (actress), Mexican actress and writer
- Claudia Smigrod, American photographer
- Claudia Spellmant, Honduran transgender activist for human rights
- Claudia Sprenger (born 1958), Liechtenstein cross-country skier
- Claudia Stack (born 1966), educator, writer, documentarian and film producer
- Claudia Stamm (born 1970), German politician
- Claudia Stănescu (born 1976), Romanian swimmer
- Claudia Ștef (born 1978), Romanian race walker
- Claudia Steger (born 1959), German sprinter
- Claudia Stevens (born 1949), American musician
- Claudia Stilz, Swiss footballer
- Claudia Stolze, German-British make-up artist
- Claudia Strobl (born 1965), Austrian alpine skier
- Claudia Sturm (born 1962), German handball player
- Claudia Suárez (born 1987), Venezuelan model and beauty pageant winner
- Claudia Sulewski, American YouTuber
- Cláudia Swan (born 1974), Brazilian sailor
- Claudia Țapardel (born 1983), Romanian politician
- Claudia Tate (1947–2002), American literary critic
- Claudia Tausend (born 1964), German politician
- Claudia Tavel (born 1989), Bolivian beauty pageant contestant
- Claudia Alta Taylor Johnson (Lady Bird Johnson, 1912–2007), First Lady of the United States
- Cláudia Teles (born 1992), Brazilian rugby player
- Cláudia Telles (1957–2020), Brazilian singer, composer and musician
- Claudia Tenney (born 1961), American politician and attorney
- Claudia Terzi, Italian politician
- Claudia Testoni (1915–1998), Italian hurler
- Claudia van Bruggen (born 1980), Dutch politician
- Claudia van Thiel (born 1977), Dutch volleyball player
- Claudia Timm (born 1973), German tennis player
- Claudia Tisamenis, 2nd-century Greco-Roman noblewoman
- Claudia Toet, Saint Eustatian politician
- Claudia Tonn (born 1981), German heptathlete
- Claudia Torres (born 2000), Dominican footballer
- Claudia Tosse, Swiss wheelchair curler
- Claudia Traisac (born 1992), Spanish actress
- Claudia Troyo (born 1977), Mexican actress
- Claudia Turbay Quintero (born 1952), Colombian journalist and diplomat
- Claudia Uhle (born 1976), German singer
- Claudia Ulloa (born 1979), Peruvian writer
- Claudia Umpiérrez (born 1983), Uruguayan association football player and lawyer
- Claudia Unger, German figure skater
- Claudia Vaca, Bolivian writer
- Claudia do Val (born 1988), Brazilian jiu-jitsu practitioner
- Claudia Valentina (born 2001), British singer and songwriter
- Clàudia Valls, mathematician
- Cláudia Vasconcelos (born 1963), Brazilian football referee
- Claudia Elena Vásquez (born 1974), Colombian model and former beauty queen
- Claudia Vázquez (born 1990), Puerto Rican footballer
- Claudia Velásquez (born 1975), Peruvian swimmer
- Claudia Verdicchio-Krause (born 1975), German sport shooter
- Claudia Verdino (born 2001), Monegasque swimmer
- Cláudia Vieira (born 1978), Portuguese actress, model and TV presenter
- Claudia Villafañe (born 1962), Argentine businesswoman and producer
- Claudia Villiger (born 1969), Swiss figure skater
- Claudia Wagner (born 1979), German model
- Claudia Wagner-Riddle, Canadian agrometeorologist
- Claudia Waldi (born 1964), German rower
- Claudia Walker (born 1996), English footballer
- Claudia Webbe (born 1965), British politician
- Claudia Weber (born 1967), German judoka
- Claudia Weill, American film director
- Claudia Wells (born 1966), American actress
- Claudia von Werlhof (born 1943), German sociologist
- Claudia Wess (born 1995), Austrian handball player
- Claudia Whitfort (born 1999), Australian rules footballer
- Claudia Wilbourn, American bodybuilder
- Claudia Wilke (born 1971), German volleyball player
- Claudia Winkleman (born 1972), English journalist
- Claudia Winterstein (born 1950), German politician
- Claudia Wittig (born 1983), German historian and politician
- Claudia Wolscht (born 1960), German film editor
- Claudia Wunderlich (born 1956), East German handball player
- Claudia Wurzel (born 1987), Italian female rower
- Claudia Zaczkiewicz (born 1962), German hurdler
- Claudia Zambuto (1885–?), Italian film actress
- Claudia Zanella (born 1979), Italian actress
- Claudia van Zanten (born 1978), Dutch politician
- Claudia E. Zapata, American artist
- Claudia Zaslavsky (1917–2006), American ethnomathematician
- Claudia Zobel (1964–1984), Filipino actress
- Claudia Zornoza (born 1990), Spanish footballer
- Claudia Zornoza (badminton) (born 1990), Peruvian badminton player

=== Middle name ===
- Ana Cláudia Lemos (born 1988), Brazilian sprinter
- Ana Cláudia Michels (born 1981), Brazilian model

== Fictional characters ==
- Claudia Blaisdel Carrington, character from the soap opera Dynasty
- Claudia Briant, from the British soap opera Doctors
- Claudia Brown, from ITV's Primeval
- C. J. Cregg, Claudia Jean Cregg, a character in the television series The West Wing
- Claudia Donovan, a character in the television series Warehouse 13
- Claudia Grant, Robotech character
- Claudia Hammond, Home and Away character
- Claudia Henderson, mother of Dustin Henderson in Netflix TV series Stranger Things
- Claudia Hernandez, character in the television series 24
- Claudia Joy Holden, character in the television series Army Wives
- Claudia Lynn Kishi, from Ann Martin's book series The Baby-Sitters Club
- Claudia LaSalle, Macross character
- Claudia (The Vampire Chronicles), from Anne Rice's Interview with the Vampire
- Claudia Whittaker, character from the soap opera Knots Landing
- Claudia Wolf, the antagonist of the video game Silent Hill 3
- Claudia Zacchara (born 1969), General Hospital character
