= Natasia =

Natasia might refer to:

- Natasia Demetriou, English comedian and actress
  - Ellie & Natasia, her sketch comedy show
- Natasia Ionescu, Romanian gymnast
- Claudia Natasia, Indonesian author and philanthropist
