= Petracchi =

Petracchi is an Italian surname. Notable people with the surname include:

- Claudia Petracchi (born 1966), Italian softball player
- Enrique Santiago Petracchi (1935–2014), Argentine lawyer, judge and a member of Supreme Court of Argentina
- Franco Petracchi (born 1937), Italian double bass soloist and teacher
