= Melissa Clark =

American food writer and cookbook author

- Born: Brooklyn, New York City, U.S.
- Education: Barnard College (BA); Columbia University (MFA)
- Occupations: Columnist; Cookbook author; Food writer
- Spouses: Max Jonson (m. 1993), div. Daniel Gercke (m. 2007)
- Children: 1
- Writing career
- Years active: 2007 – Present
- Notable awards: 2001 James Beard Award for "Vegetarian Publication"; 2018 James Beard Award for "Innovative Storytelling"
- Website: melissaclark.net

Melissa Clark is an American food writer, cookbook author, and New York Times columnist. She is the author of over 40 cookbooks and has received multiple awards from the James Beard Foundation and IACP (International Association of Culinary Professionals) for her work. Clark has been a regular guest on television series such as Today show, Rachael Ray, and Iron Chef America and on radio programs such as The Splendid Table on NPR and The Leonard Lopate Show on WNYC.

== Early life and education ==
Clark is the daughter of Julian Clark and Rita Clark, both of whom were practicing psychiatrists. She is a third-generation Brooklynite and grew up in the Ditmas Park neighborhood. Her parents were avid home cooks, influenced by Julia Child. As a child, Clark spent the month of August with her family each year in Provence, France. Clark is Jewish.

Clark attended Stuyvesant High School and then Barnard College, where she studied English and history and wrote a thesis on the role of food in Don Quixote. She graduated in 1990, and in 1994 earned an MFA from Columbia University, where she took a food-writing class taught by Betty Fussell.

== Career and works ==
In her early career, Clark was a freelance writer for various publications, including the New York Times, and worked in "front of house" jobs at restaurants. In 2007, she began her weekly "A Good Appetite" column at The New York Times, She became a full-time staff writer at the Times in 2012, writing about 65 recipes each year for the newspaper. Clark has described herself as "an advocate for the home cook" and "the voice of the home cook" in interviews.

In 2015, Clark gained attention for a recipe for guacamole with green peas that she had reported on a few years earlier (the recipe was created as a collaboration between chef Jean-Georges Vongerichten and chef de cuisine Ian Coogan for Vongerichten's restaurant ABC Cocina); the piece was re-tweeted by The New York Times and attracted viral feedback, including tweets from President Barack Obama and former Governor of Florida Jeb Bush, both of whom disapproved of her addition of peas to the traditional recipe ingredients. Clark's most favored ingredient is anchovies, which she praises for their versatility.

Clark has written more than 40 cookbooks, including Braise: A Journey Through International Cuisine (2007), with Daniel Boulud; East of Paris with David Bouley; The Last Course: The Desserts of Gramercy Tavern with Claudia Fleming, the former pastry chef at Gramercy Tavern in New York; and Cook This Now (2011), which focuses on seasonal cooking. Clark's cookbook Dinner: Changing the Game won an award in 2018 from the International Association of Culinary Professionals. For The New Essentials of French Cooking, which was published in print and as a series of articles on NYT Cooking, Clark won the 2018 James Beard Foundation Journalism Award for innovative storytelling.

In 2019, Clark hosted a podcast series, Weeknight Kitchen with Melissa Clark, produced by The Splendid Table.

== Personal life ==
Clark has married three times. Her first marriage was in 1993 to Max Jonson. In 2007, she married her third husband, Daniel Gercke, with whom she has one child. The family lives in Prospect Heights, Brooklyn.
