= Valerie Steele =

American fashion historian

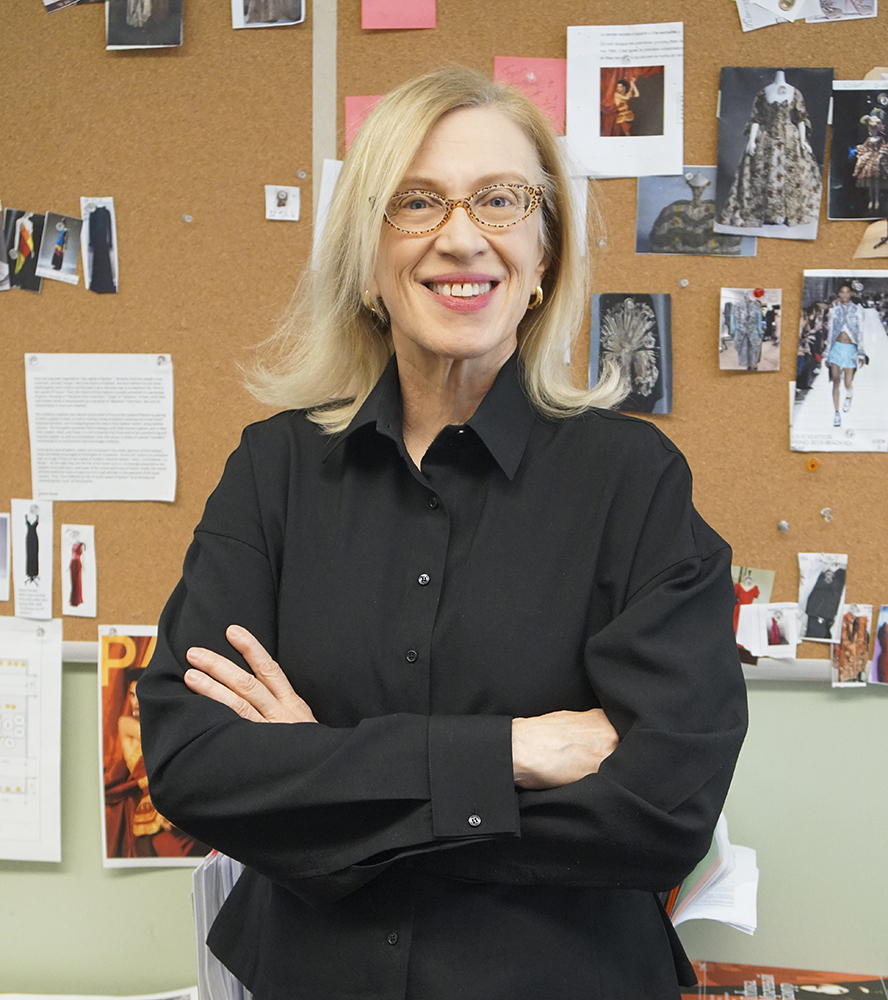
Valerie Steele

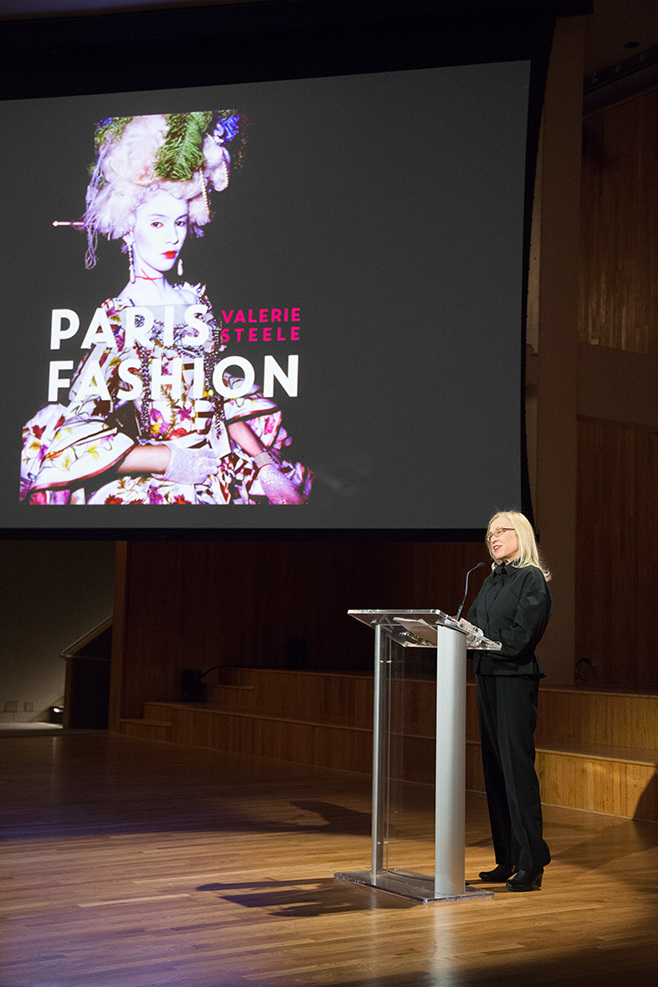
Valerie Steele in September 2015

Valerie Fahnestock Steele (born 1955) is an American fashion historian, curator, and director of the Museum at the Fashion Institute of Technology. Steele has written more than eight books on the history of fashion, and can be regarded as one of the pioneers in the study of fashion. She was appointed director of the museum in 2003.

== Biography ==
As director and chief curator of the museum, Steele has curated more than 25 exhibitions over the past twenty years, including Gothic: Dark Glamour, Love & War: The Weaponized Woman, The Corset: Fashioning the Body, and Femme Fatale: Fashion in Fin-de-Siècle Paris.

In addition Steele is the editor-in-chief of Fashion Theory: The Journal of Dress, Body & Culture (Berg Publishers), an academic journal which she founded in 1997. She is the author of numerous books, including Gothic: Dark Glamour, The Corset: A Cultural History, Paris Fashion: Fifty Years of Fashion: New Look to Now, and Women of Fashion: 20th-Century Designers.

She gives lectures frequently and has appeared on many television programs, including The Oprah Winfrey Show. After she appeared on the PBS special, The Way We Wear, she was described in The Washington Post as one of "fashion's brainiest women". Often quoted in media, she was herself the subject of profiles in Forbes and The New York Times as well as being listed in the New York Daily News "Fashion's 50 Most Powerful". She has also appeared on various podcasts including Creative Conversations with Suzy Menkes, Nymphet Alumni, Dressed: The History of Fashion, and The Museum at FIT Fashion Culture Podcast.

== Selected works ==
- Gothic: Dark Glamour, Yale University Press, 2008, ISBN 0-300-13694-3 / 9780300136944 / 0-300-13694-3.
- Encyclopedia of clothing and fashion (editor in chief), Charles Scribner's Sons, 2005, ISBN 0-684-31451-7.
- Fashion, Italian style, Yale University Press, 2003, ISBN 0-300-10014-0.
- The Fan: Fashion and Femininity Unfolded, Rizzoli International Publications, 2002, ISBN 0-8478-2446-2.
- The Red Dress, Rizzoli International Publications, 2001, ISBN 0-8478-2392-X.
- The Corset: a cultural history, Yale University Press, 2001, ISBN 0-300-09071-4.
- Shoes: a lexicon of style, Rizzoli International Publications, 1999, ISBN 0-8478-2166-8.
- China chic : East meets West (with John S. Major), Yale University Press, 1999, ISBN 0-300-07930-3.
- Bags: a lexicon of style (with Laird Borrelli), Scriptum Publishers, 1999, ISBN 1-902686-04-7.
- Fifty years of fashion: new look to now, Yale University Press, 1997, ISBN 0-300-07132-9.
- Fetish: fashion, sex, and power, Oxford University Press, 1996, ISBN 0-19-509044-6.
- Women of fashion: twentieth-century designers, Rizzoli International Publications, 1991, ISBN 0-8478-1394-0.
- Men and women: dressing the part (editor, with Claudia Brush Kidwell), Smithsonian, 1989, ISBN 0-87474-559-4.
- Paris fashion: a cultural history, Oxford University Press, 1988, ISBN 0-19-504465-7.
- Fashion and eroticism: ideals of feminine beauty from the Victorian era to the Jazz Age, Oxford University Press, 1985, ISBN 0-19-503530-5.
