= Claudia Eckert =

Claudia Eckert may refer to:

- Claudia Eckert (computer scientist), German malware and machine learning researcher
- Claudia Eckert (engineer), engineering design professor at The Open University in England
