= Klaudia =

Female given name

- Gender: Female
- Name day: 27 May (Estonia); 20 March (Hungary); 20 March (Poland); 17 November (Slovakia)

Origin
- Meaning: Lameness or enclosure

Other names
- Alternative spelling: Claudia, Cláudia
- Related names: Klavdija, Klavdiya, Claudette, Claudius, Claude, Claudine, Claudiu, Claudio

Klaudia is a feminine given name, a cognate of the name Claudia. It is an equivalent to the male given names Claudius, Claude and Claudio.

Individuals bearing the name Klaudia include:

- Klaudia Adamek (born 1999), Polish sprinter
- Klaudia Alagierska (born 1996), Polish volleyball player
- Klaudia Boczová (born 1990), Slovak tennis player
- Klaudia Breś (born 1994), Polish sport shooter
- Klaudia Dernerová (born 1971), Slovak operatic soprano
- Klaudia Dudová (born 1988), Czech actress
- Klaudia Fabová (born 1998), Slovak footballer
- Klaudia Grzelak (born 1996), Polish volleyball player
- Klaudia Halejcio, Polish TV and film actress
- Klaudia Hornung (1962–2022), German rower
- Klaudia Jachira (born 1988), Polish politician, actress, comedian, and YouTuber
- Klaudia Jans-Ignacik (born 1984), Polish tennis player
- Klaudia Jedlińska (born 2000), Polish footballer
- Klaudia Kaczorowska (born 1988), Polish volleyball player
- Klaudia Kardasz (born 1996), Polish shot putter
- Klaudia Kazimierska (born 2001), Polish middle-distance runner
- Klaudia Kinská (born 1978), Slovak gymnast
- Klaudia Konieczna (born 1995), Polish volleyball player
- Klaudia Konopko (born 1992), Polish sprinter
- Klaudia Koronel (born 1975), Filipina businesswoman and actress
- Klaudia Kovács, Hungarian film and theater director
- Klaudia Kovács (born 1990), Hungarian footballer
- Klaudia Kulon (born 1992), Polish chess player
- Klaudia Maliszewska (born 1992), Polish Paralympic shot putter
- Klaudia Maruszewska (born 1997), Polish javelin thrower
- Klaudia Medlová (born 1993), Slovak snowboarder
- Klaudia Michnová (born 1990), Slovak handball player
- Klaudia Naziębło (born 1993), Polish swimmer
- Klaudia Olejniczak (born 1997), Polish footballer
- Klaudia Pasternak (born 1980), Polish composer and opera conductor
- Klaudia Pielesz (born 1988), Polish handball player
- Klaudia Rrotani (born 1995), Albanian footballer
- Klaudia Schifferle (born 1955), Swiss musician (Kleenex, LiLiPUT) and painter
- Klaudia Siciarz (born 1998), Polish hurdler
- Klaudia Śmieja-Rostworowska, Polish film producer
- Klaudia Sosnowska, Polish basketball player
- Klaudia Szemereyné Pataki (born 1976), Hungarian politician
- Klaudia Taev (1906–1985), Estonian vocal pedagogue
- Klaudia Tanner (born 1970), Austrian politician
- Klaudia Tiitsmaa (born 1990), Estonian actress
- Klaudia Wojtunik (born 1999), Polish hurdler
- Klaudia Zwolińska (born 1998), Polish slalom canoeist
