= Claudia Spellmant =

Honduran transgender activist for human rights

Claudia Dayanara Spellman Sosa (born in Honduras in the 20th century) is a Honduran LGBT and transgender activist. For her efforts as a human rights defender, Time magazine named her as one of the hundred most influential people of 2021.

== Life ==
According to reports by the global LGBTIQ organization OutRight Action International, on May 26, 2007, Claudia Spellmant was stopped by a police patrol in San Pedro Sulas on her way to a concert and asked to get into the police vehicle for no reason. When she refused, she was detained and taken to the police station. Half an hour later, seven other women, three of them trans people, were physically, verbally and psychologically abused by the police officers. Colonel Sandoval, the municipal police chief, gave orders to beat one of the arrested trans women. The reason he gave was that she had defied his order to avoid certain public areas in the city that were only for so-called normal and decent people.

Because of violence against trans people, Claudia Spellmant fled Honduras in 2013 and now lives in New York. She works as a model.

== Involvement ==
Claudia Spellmant belongs to the transgender organization Colectivo Travesti of San Pedro Sula and is a member of the network Redlactrans, which represents organizations of trans people in Latin America and the Caribbean. This advocates for the visibility of trans people and an improvement in their legal situation. Spellmant founded the trans collective Colectivo Unidad Color Rossa.

=== Landmark court ruling: Vicky Hernández v. State of Honduras ===
Together with the human rights organization Robert F. Kennedy Human Rights, the lesbian network Cattrachas founded by Indyra Mendoza brought the case of trans person and activist for trans women Vicky Hernández before the Inter-American Court of Human Rights in Costa Rica. They represented the family of the slain and sued the Honduran government. In 2009, Hernández had been brutally murdered in San Pedro Sula at the age of 26. This was part of a series of murders of trans individuals that followed a June coup that ousted President José Manuel Zelaya.

From its hearing location in San José, Costa Rica, the court called other trans people to the stand by virtual means. Among them was Claudia Spellmant, who had been friends with Vicky Hernández. Hernández regularly visited Spellmant's Colectivo Unidad Color Rossa- office in San Pedro Sula. Initially, Hernández only procured condoms and attended security training there, but later she became an active member of the collective. Authorities proved Hernández was infected with HIV and subsequently did not perform an autopsy, so the circumstances of her death could not be fully determined. Spellmant testified that Hernández's body showed no signs of autopsy, but had been shot in the head. The witness expressed the belief that Hernández died because she was an HIV-infected trans person.

Spellmant testified in 2020 that in Honduras, systematic discrimination pushed trans people into prostitution. Most trans people who remained in that state would die.

The court in June 2021 ordered the Honduran government to continue investigating the case and to initiate legislation to protect LGBT persons. Among other things, it said, trans people should be allowed to officially change their gender identity. In addition, the court ordered the government to pay $30,000 in damages to the family of Vicky Hernández. In addition, the Honduran government would have to create a scholarship for trans women named after Vicky Hernández. Also, an anti-discrimination program must be created for security agencies, and a state registry of violent acts against LGBT people must be created. Honduras has announced it will comply with the ruling.

Claudia Spellmant and her peers thus achieved for the first time a landmark court ruling on the question of whether governments in the region had done enough to protect trans people so far. This ruling is considered a legal "milestone" for Latin America and the Caribbean.

=== Background ===
Honduras is one of the most dangerous countries for people in the LGBTIQ community. More than 389 murders of LGBTIQ people have been recorded since August 2009 (as of August 2021). Only 89 of the cases have been prosecuted and 90 percent of the acts go unpunished. Due to the widespread impunity of these crimes against people of the LGBTIQ community, numerous organizations formed to create shelters, record the acts of violence, and disseminate them in the international media. According to observations by the Rainbow Association, an average of one LGBTI person is killed every 11 days in Honduras. That's about 33 per year.

== Awards ==
- 2021: Time magazine: Claudia Spellmant, along with Indyra Mendoza, was selected as one of the one hundred most influential people of 2021 and named to the Time 100 list.
