= Claudia Gabel =

American writer

Claudia Gabel (born February 20, 1975) is the author of several young adult novels published by Scholastic Inc and HarperCollins.

== Biography ==
Gabel grew up in Binghamton, New York, attended Seton Catholic Central High School, and received her BA in Literature and Rhetoric from Binghamton University in 1997 and her MA in English and American Literature from Hofstra University in 2000. She resides in New York City. In 2012, Gabel married Benjamin Lindvall.

== Career ==
Gabel's In or Out series consists of four novels--In or Out (2007), Loves Me Loves Me Not (2007), Sweet & Vicious (2008), and Friends Close, Enemies Closer (2008). The books are set in Poughkeepsie, New York and follow best friends Nola James and Marnie Fitzpatrick through their first two months of high school. Romeo and Juliet and Vampires (2010) is a mash-up novelization of William Shakespeare's famous play, featuring a new version of the love story between Juliet Capulet, the daughter of two notorious vampires, and Romeo Montague, who was born into a family of vampire slayers.

In 2017, Gabel wrote a new book (with Cheryl Klam) titled Elusion. The book is about the dangers of escapism.

Gabel's latest book, Paradise, a mystery set at a luxury resort, will come out in October of 2026.

Gabel is also a book editor. In late 2000, she got her first job as an editorial assistant job at HarperCollins, where she worked behind-the-scenes with two senior editors on several books, including Have a Nice Day! A Tale of Blood and Sweatsocks by WWE wrestler Mick Foley and To Hell and Back by recording artist Meatloaf. From 2001 until 2002, she was an assistant editor at Crown Publishers There, she created and edited several books, including The Luxe. In 2005, Gabel moved to Random House Children’s Books as an editor and continued her work on novels for teens and middle-grade readers. In 2016, Gabel bought Iva Marie Palmer's Gabby Garcia series and the YA science fiction trilogy. Later, she became a senior editor at Katherine Tegen Books, an imprint of HarperCollins. Gabel currently is the CEO of Twenty Story Studio, a book packaging company based in Philadelphia.
