= Claudia Hernández =

Claudia Hernandez may refer to:

- Claudia Hernández (Mexican model), Mexican model and beauty pageant titleholder
- Claudia Hernández (Peruvian model), Peruvian TV host, model and beauty titleholder
- Claudia Hernández (tennis) (born 1966), Mexican tennis player
- Claudia Hernández (writer) (born 1975), Salvadoran writer
- Claudia Hernandez (24 character), character in the TV series 24
