= Claudia Sturm =

German handball player (born 1962)

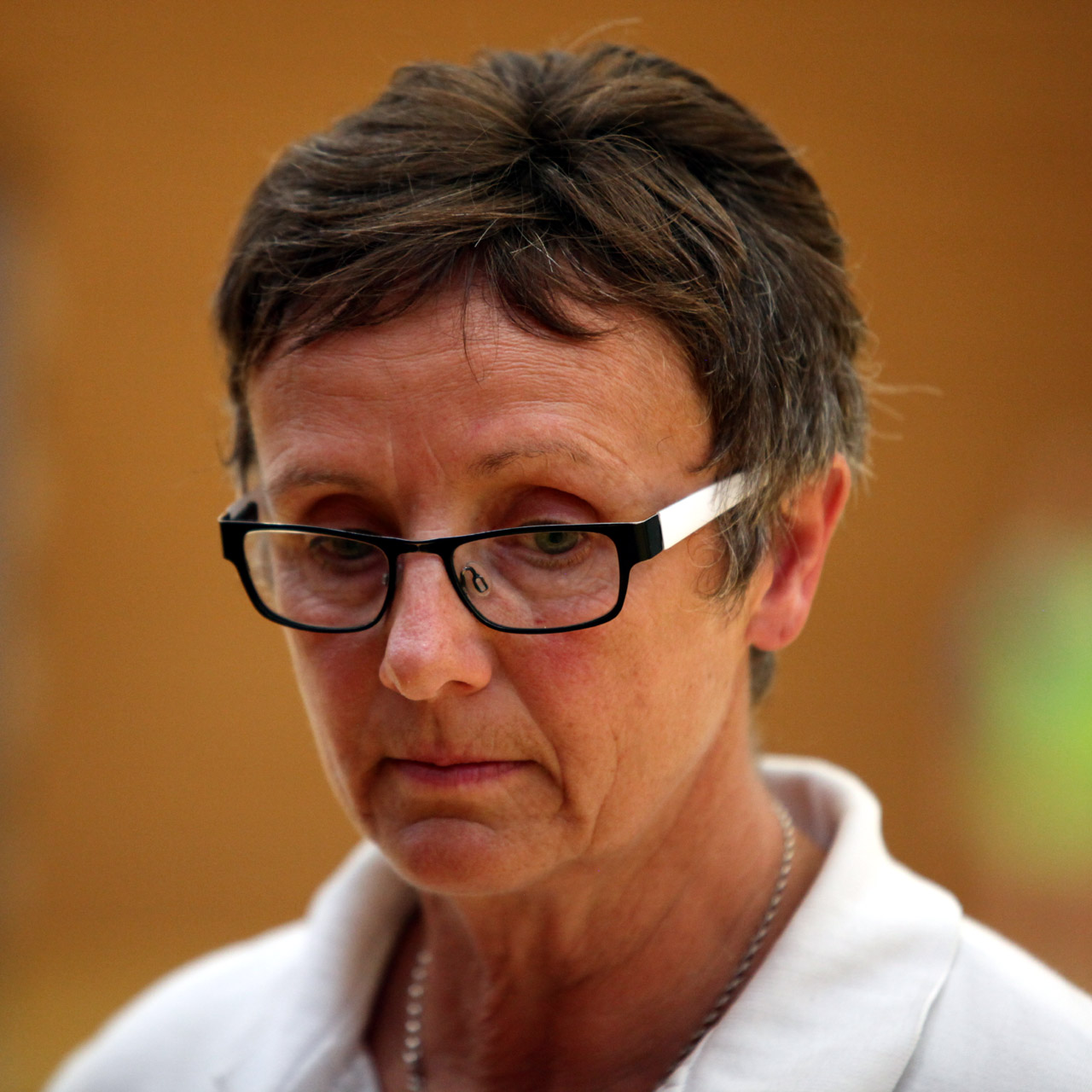
- Sturm in 2017

Personal information
- Nationality: German
- Born: 27 September 1962 (age 64) Heppenheim, West Germany
- Height: 166 cm (65 in)

Sport
- Sport: Handball
- Position: Right wing

Senior clubs
- Years: Team
- –: TSV Rot-Weiß Auerbach
- –: VfL Neckargartach
National team
| Years | Team | Apps | (Gls) |
| – | West Germany | 103 | (167) |

Claudia Sturm (born 27 September 1962) is a German handball player who played for the West German national team. She was born in Heppenheim. She represented West Germany at the 1984 Summer Olympics in Los Angeles, where the West German team placed fourth.
