= Claudia S. Miller =

American immunologist

Claudia S. Miller, an allergist and immunologist, is an author, instructor, and scientist noted for research in chemical intolerance, and development of tools for its diagnosis. Miller is a professor of occupational and environmental medicine in the School of Medicine at the University of Texas Health Science Center at San Antonio. She also is assistant dean for the school's M.D.-M.P.H. program, and vice chair of community medicine in the school's Department of Family and Community Medicine.

== Professional biography ==
Miller coauthored a report for the state of New Jersey on chemical susceptibility, for which the state received the World Health Organization's Macedo award, and coauthored Chemical Exposures: Low Levels and High Stakes. She has authored or coauthored numerous book chapters and peer-reviewed publications on the health effects of low-level chemical exposures.

She organized and chaired two National Institutes of Health meetings on chemical intolerance, and documented toxicant-induced loss of tolerance (TILT), a proposed disease mechanism she first described in 1996. Miller is a leading advocate for the need and use of environmentally controlled hospital units for research.

Miller is also founder and director of the South Texas Environmental Education and Research program at the University of Texas Health Science Center at San Antonio. The program is the only medical school curriculum to offer hands-on training and field experiences in environmental health, public health, and international health at the U.S.-Mexico border for students in MD/MPH, medical, public health, and other health professions degree programs.

Miller's research interests include "neurodevelopment and the environment (autism, attention deficit hyperactivity disorder), and the use of an environmentally-controlled, hospital-based medical unit for assessing health effects of low level chemical exposures in a wide range of chronic illnesses-including asthma, autoimmune diseases, chronic fatigue, fibromyalgia, ADHD, autism, chemical intolerance, and Gulf War veterans illnesses."

Miller's work focuses on the role of chemical exposures on human health. She also has consulted in cases of chemically related illnesses.

For her contributions in the health professions, Miller was inducted into the San Antonio Women's Celebration and Hall of Fame.

== Publications ==
Books

- Ashford NA, Miller CS (1998). Chemical Exposures: Low Levels and High Stakes (2nd ed.). Wiley-Interscience. ISBN 0471292400.

Chapters

- Miller CS (2003). "Multiple Chemical Intolerance". In Doty R (ed.). (2nd ed.). New York: Marcel Dekker, Inc. doi:10.1201/9780203911457.ch25 (inactive 11 July 2025). ISBN 978-0-8247-0719-4. ;

Papers

- Katerndahl, D. A.; Bell, I. R.; Palmer, R. F.; Miller, C. S. (2012). "Chemical Intolerance in Primary Care Settings: Prevalence, Comorbidity, and Outcomes". The Annals of Family Medicine. 10 (4): 357–365. doi:10.1370/afm.1346. PMC 3392295. PMID 22778124.
- Miller, Claudia S. (2006). "The Compelling Anomaly of Chemical Intolerance". Annals of the New York Academy of Sciences. 933 (1): 1–23. Bibcode:2001NYASA.933....1M. doi:10.1111/j.1749-6632.2001.tb05810.x. PMID 12000012. S2CID 44995078.
- Miller, Claudia S. (2001). "Toxicant-induced loss of tolerance". Addiction. 96 (1): 115–37. doi:10.1046/j.1360-0443.2001.9611159.x. PMID 11177524.
- Miller, C. S.; Prihoda, T. J. (1999). "The Environmental Exposure and Sensitivity Inventory (EESI): A standardized approach for measuring chemical intolerances for research and clinical applications". Toxicology and Industrial Health. 15 (3–4): 370–385. doi:10.1177/074823379901500311. PMID 10416289. S2CID 9714970.
- Miller, C. S.; Prihoda, T. J. (1999). "A controlled comparison of symptoms and chemical intolerances reported by Gulf War veterans, implant recipients and persons with multiple chemical sensitivity". Toxicology and Industrial Health. 15 (3–4): 386–397. doi:10.1177/074823379901500312. PMID 10416290. S2CID 23607800.
- Miller, C. S. (1997). "Toxicant-induced loss of tolerance--an emerging theory of disease?". Environmental Health Perspectives. 105 (Suppl 2): 445–453. doi:10.1289/ehp.97105s2445. PMC 1469811. PMID 9167978.
- Miller, C; Ashford, N; Doty, R; Lamielle, M; Otto, D; Rahill, A; Wallace, L (1997). "Empirical approaches for the investigation of toxicant-induced loss of tolerance". Environmental Health Perspectives. 105 (Suppl 2): 515–519. doi:10.1289/ehp.97105s2515. PMC 1469807. PMID 9167989.
