= Claudia Märtl =

German historian (born 1954)

Claudia Märtl (born 3 July 1954 in Amberg) is a German historian. She is a professor of Medieval history at LMU Munich. Her research focuses on English and Romance languages. In March 2011, she was elected to succeed Rudolf Schieffer as President of the Monumenta Germaniae Historica. She took office on 1 April 2012 for a limited period of two years. On 31 March 2014, she resigned as president after a very vehement protest against the savings measures of the Free State of Bavaria and reform demands from the State Ministry for Education, Culture, Science and Art, which was taken over by Ludwig Spaenle (CSU). With her presentation of the "101 most important questions" ("101 wichtigsten Fragen"), she became known to a wider audience, to whom she easily introduced the Middle Ages. She is a member of the Bavarian Academy of Sciences and Humanities (since 2006). In 2014, she was made a Corresponding Fellow of the British Academy.
