= Claudia Ratti =

Nuclear physicist

Prof Claudia Ratti
- Education: Torino University
- Scientific career
- Fields: Physics
- Workplaces: University of Houston
- Thesis: Stability of strange matter: a comparison between different models (2004)
- Doctoral advisor: Wanda Maria Alberico
- Website: nsmn1.uh.edu/cratti/index.html

Claudia Ratti is a nuclear physicist at University of Houston.

== Education and early career ==
Ratti was born in 1976. She completed her undergraduate Physics degree in 1999, and PhD in 2003, both at Torino University. She held post-doc positions at institutions such as the Technical University of Munich and the University of Wuppertal, before becoming an assistant professor at Torino University. She then moved to University of Houston in 2014, where she became a tenured professor and Physics Department Associate Chair.

== Research ==
Ratti investigates quantum chromodynamics (QCD) and quark gluon plasma, along with extreme environments in neutron stars.

== Awards and honors ==
- 2021 – Fellow of the American Physical Society for "outstanding contributions to understanding the thermodynamic properties of quantum chromodynamics matter and subsequent connecting lattice results with experimental data."
- 2017 - National Science Foundation CAREER award

== Selected publications ==
=== Journal articles ===
- Borsányi, Szabolcs; Fodor, Zoltán; Hoelbling, Christian; Katz, Sándor D.; Krieg, Stefan; Ratti, Claudia; Szabó, Kálmán K. (September 2010). "Is there still any Tc mystery in lattice QCD? Results with physical masses in the continuum limit III". Journal of High Energy Physics. 2010 (9). arXiv:1005.3508. doi:10.1007/JHEP09(2010)073.
- Borsányi, Szabolcs; Endrődi, Gergely; Fodor, Zoltán; Jakovác, Antal; Katz, Sándor D.; Krieg, Stefan; Ratti, Claudia; Szabó, Kálmán K. (November 2010). "The QCD equation of state with dynamical quarks". Journal of High Energy Physics. 2010 (11). arXiv:1007.2580. doi:10.1007/JHEP11(2010)077.
- Ratti, Claudia; Thaler, Michael A.; Weise, Wolfram (20 January 2006). "Phases of QCD: Lattice thermodynamics and a field theoretical model". Physical Review D. 73 (1) 014019. arXiv:hep-ph/0506234. doi:10.1103/PhysRevD.73.014019.
- Rößner, S.; Ratti, C.; Weise, W. (8 February 2007). "Polyakov loop, diquarks, and the two-flavor phase diagram". Physical Review D. 75 (3) 034007. arXiv:hep-ph/0609281. doi:10.1103/PhysRevD.75.034007.

=== Books ===
- Ratti, Claudia; Bellwied, Rene (2021). The deconfinement transition of QCD: theory meets experiment. Cham: Springer. ISBN 978-3-030-67234-8.
