= Claudia Huckle =

British operatic contralto

Claudia Huckle is a British operatic mezzo-soprano.

Huckle studied at the Royal College of Music, the New England Conservatory and the Curtis Institute of Music. She was the first woman to win the Birgit Nilsson Prize for singing Wagner, at Operalia 2013.
