= Claudia Ancapán =

Chilean midwife and transsexual activist

Claudia Ancapán Quilape
- Born: 1976 (age 49–50); Chile
- Education: Universidad Austral de Chile
- Occupations: Midwife, trans activist
- Known for: Transgender rights activism

Claudia Ancapán Quilape (born 1976) is a Chilean Mapuche midwife and transsexual activist. Claudia began to express as a female at the age of five. In her adult life, Ancapán has worked as an activist to promote the rights of trans peoples in Chile.

== Biography ==
Claudia Ancapán Quilape was born in Chile in 1976 to a family with Mapuche heritage. Ancapán began to express herself as a female around the age of 3; these habits continued, and, by the age of 5, was forced to live a double life, expressing herself as a girl in private and a "boy" in public. During her time in primary school, Ancapán was bullied and occasionally beaten.

In the 1990s, Ancapán attended the Universidad Austral de Chile, where she studied obstetrics. During her time at the university, she began to research hormone therapy and began to self-treat herself with hormones she (as a student of obstetrics) had access to. She successfully graduated university, but found that finding employment was difficult for a trans woman. She eventually found work as a midwife, and became active in the Chilean trans community; her efforts to promote the idea of gender equality in Chile has resulted in her being cited as one of the most influential members of the Chilean trans community.
