= Claudia Eckert (engineer) =

Engineering educator

Claudia M. Eckert is an engineering educator specialising in the engineering design process. Educated in Germany, Scotland, and England, she works in England as a professor of design at the Open University.

== Education and career ==
Eckert was a student of mathematics at LMU Munich in Germany, and a student of philosophy at the Munich School of Philosophy, a small Jesuit school in Munich. After earning a bachelor's degree from the Munich School of Philosophy, and a master's degree in Applied Artificial Intelligence from the University of Aberdeen in Scotland, in 1990, she completed a PhD in 1997 at the Open University. Her dissertation, Intelligent support for knitwear design, was jointly supervised by Helmut Bez, Jeff Johnson, and Nigel Cross.

After continuing as a researcher at the Open University and then working for approximately ten years at the University of Cambridge, in the university's Engineering Design Centre, she became a senior lecturer at the Open University in 2008. She was promoted to professor in 2013.
