= Claudia Maté =

Post-internet artist

- Born: Madrid, Spain; 1985
- Known for: Artist
- Notable work: She is co-founder and curator of cloaque.org.

Claudia Maté (born 1985) is an artist originally from Madrid, living in Paris. Maté works in digital media, a "pixellated world where anything is possible".

== Early life and education ==
Maté was born in Madrid, Spain, in 1985. She is co-founder and curator of cloaque.org.

== Critical reception ==
My work is based more on experimenting than working on fixed ideas. I really like it when I get results that surprise me. Chaos theory is the perfect way to end up with something unexpected. The ideas become fractals and that really makes me enjoy my work.

—Claudia Mate

Maté works in various formats, including programming, 3D, video, videogames, virtual reality, GIF and sound. MatLaura Pérez of Highxtar wrote, "Her work fuses the familiar / common with the weird / unusual and the futuristic with the retro." In a 2015 article subtitled, "Spanish artist Claudia Maté is at the forefront of the digital art avant-garde", the staff of i-D wrote that she is "a recognised digital artist who exhibits in half the world (New York, Madrid, Paris, Berlin, Chile, Peru, London…) and who works with a thousand and one formats that know no borders".

ArtFCity commented on the high proiduction quality of her work, as well as her "dark humor and wry criticism". Dazed reported, "Her sometimes provocative work is impregnated with Internet-era elements, working on a personal level." El Mundo reported, "The Madrilenian was invited by photographer Nick Knight to animate the cover of the Icelandic 'Homogenic' album. The work was part of the retrospective dedicated to the singer that was hosted by the Museum of Modern Art in New York (MoMA) this year and she was consecrated as the standard bearer of 'net art' ."

== Selected exhibitions ==
Q21 wrote, "Mate's work has been exhibited internationally in NYC, Madrid, Paris, Canada, Croatia, Italy, Berlin, Chile, Buenos Aires, Switzerland, Venezuela, Lima, Miami, Iran, Peru, Lithuania, London and online." Her work ihas been exhibited in MOMA, The Photographers Gallery in London, Art Basel in Miami, Tate Britain, and Centre Pompidou.
