= Claudia Fährenkemper =

German photographer

Claudia Fährenkemper (born 1959) is a German photographer. Fährenkemper was born in Castrop-Rauxel, Germany. She is known for her work landscape photography and photomicroscopy. Since 2010 she has pursued a project photographing 15th to 17th century suits of armor.

Her work is included in the collections of the National Gallery of Canada, and the Portland Art Museum.

== Biography ==
In addition to desert and canyon landscapes in the USA, starting in 1988, Fährenkemper first photographed the landscape in the Rhenish lignite mining area with a large-format camera before she photographed the gigantic conveying equipment (excavators, spreaders and conveyor bridges) that caused the transformation of the landscape in West and East German lignite opencast mines until 1993.

For a decade from the mid-1990s she used the scanning electron microscope as an artist at the Zoological Research Museum Alexander Koenig in Bonn to explore the microcosm of insects, plant seeds, amphibian larvae, crystals and plankton that are invisible to the naked human eye. Her real interest was not in the scientific object, but in the precise depiction. The almost haptic presence of the surface relief, enhanced by the use of the scanning electron microscope, enables the sensual experience of organic or inorganic living environments and the plastic experience of abstract pictorial spaces.

Fährenkemper's "Ancestral Gallery of the Microcosm," particularly her microscopic portraits of insects, eventually led to her portraits of knightly and samurai armor of 16th-19th century European and Japanese cultural heritage, which she photographed in museums around the world from 2010 to 2019.
