= Claudia R. Binder =

Swiss-Canadian-Colombian researcher

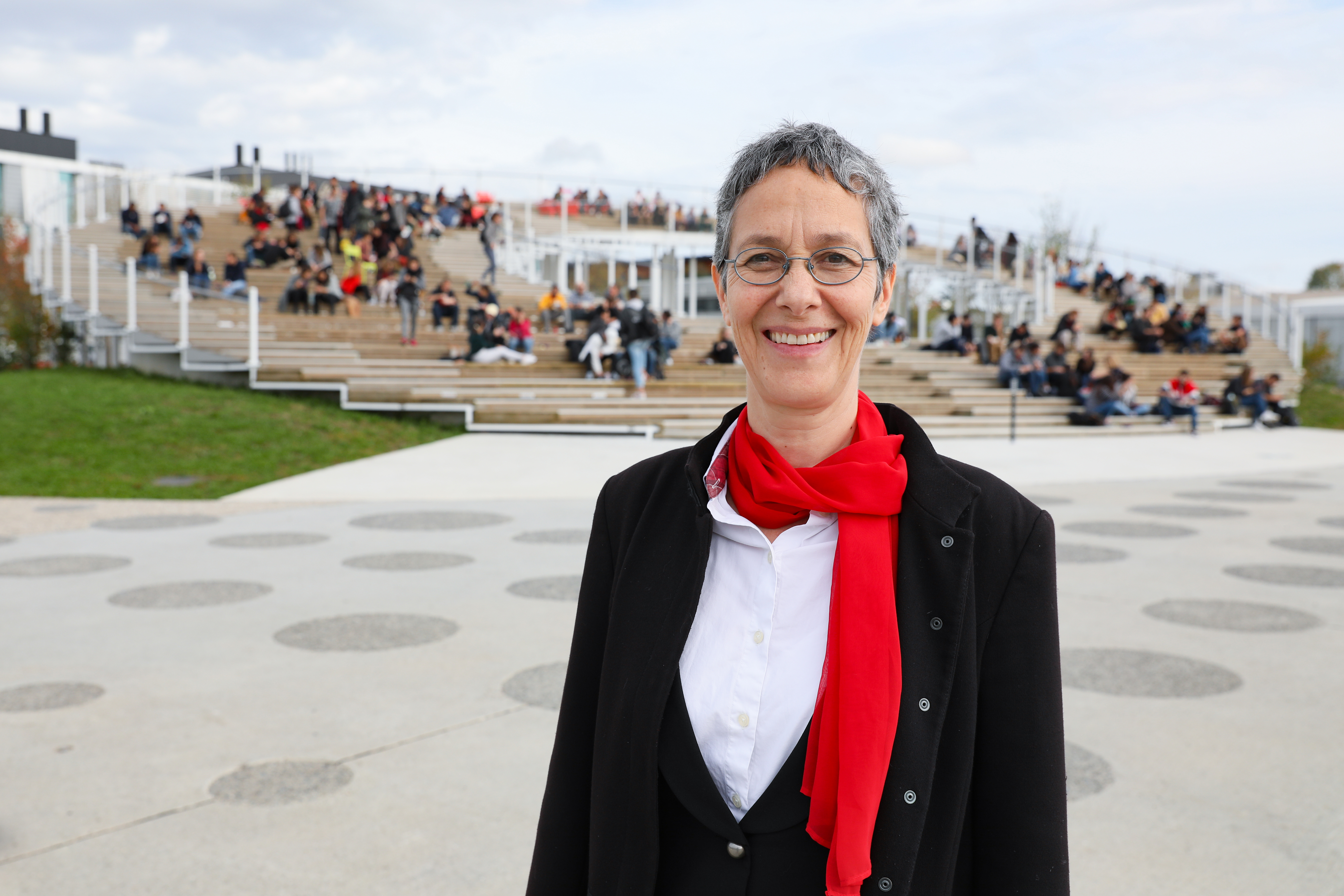
- Claudia R. Binder in front of the Agora Lombard Odier at EPFL

Academic background
- Education: Biochemistry; Environmental sciences
- Alma mater: ETH Zurich; University of Maryland

Academic work
- Discipline: Human-environment systems; Sustainability issues
- Institutions: École polytechnique fédérale de Lausanne
- Website: https://www.epfl.ch/labs/herus/

Claudia R. Binder (born in Montreal) is a Swiss, Canadian and Colombian environmental scientist working in the field of human-environment systems and sustainability s. Since March 2016 she has been a full professor the La Mobilière Chair on Urban Ecology and Sustainable Living at École polytechnique fédérale de Lausanne (EPFL) in Switzerland and founding director of the Laboratory for Human-Environment Relations in Urban Systems (HERUS) at School of Architecture, Civil and Environmental Engineering (ENAC) of EPFL. Since January 2020 she has been serving as dean of ENAC at EPFL.

== Early life and education ==
Binder was born in Montreal, Canada, and spent most of her childhood in Switzerland and Colombia.

From 1985 to 1996 Binder studied at ETH Zurich, first earning a degree in biochemistry and then a PhD in environmental sciences. She then joined University of Maryland, USA, for post-doctoral research.

== Career ==
In 1998 she returned to ETH Zurich as a senior research scientist to study the interaction between human and environmental systems at the Institute for Natural and Social Science Interface. In 2006, she was nominated assistant professor in the Department of Geography at University of Zurich, and in 2009 moved to the University of Graz in Austria as was full professor of systems science. In 2011, she became full professor of human-environment relations at the Department of Geography at LMU Munich. Binder joined École polytechnique fédérale de Lausanne (EPFL) in March 2016 and founded the Laboratory for Human-Environment Relations in Urban Systems (HERUS) at School of Architecture, Civil and Environmental Engineering (ENAC), where she also holds the La Mobilière Chair on Urban Ecology and Sustainable Living.

At EPFL, Binder is the academic director of Design Together, a cross-disciplinary teaching initiative. In 2018 she was appointed to the management team of the Energy Center and in 2019 as head of the working group on EPFL’s energy and sustainability strategy.

== Research ==
Her research involves analyzing, modeling and assessing the transition of urban systems towards sustainability. She examines the dynamics of urban metabolism, what characterizes a sustainable city, and what drives and hinders transformation processes. She does so by combining knowledge from social, natural and data science. Her research focuses on food, energy, and sustainable living and transport in urban systems.

== Distinction ==
Memberships:

- Member of the Research Council of the Programs Division at Swiss National Science Foundation's (SNSF) (2016)
- Member of the Steering Committee SNSF’s National Research Program 71 (Managing Energy Consumption)
- Member of the Swiss Competence Centers for Energy Research (SCCER)
- Member of the Steering Board on Sustainability Research at Swiss Academies of Arts and Sciences
- Member of the University Council of LMU Munich (2019)

== Publications ==
Claudia R. Binder publications indexed by Google Scholar
