= Claudia Calderon =

Colombian pianist and composer

- Born: 1959 (age 66–67); Palmira, Valle del Cauca, Colombia
- Occupation: Musician
- Instrument: Piano

Claudia Calderon is a Colombian pianist and composer who was born in Palmira, Valle del Cauca, Colombia in 1959 and moved to Venezuela in 1987.

== Biography ==
After studying in Cali and Bogotá, Calderon went to Europe, graduating from the Musikhochschule in Hannover, Germany, and attending courses in Italy supervised by György Sándor. On her return to Venezuela she became a professor at the Simón Bolívar Conservatory and at the Instituto Universitario de Estudios Musicales in Caracas.

She has recorded three albums of her own compositions based on traditional music of Venezuela and Colombia, as well as a disc of solo piano works of the Colombian composer Pedro Morales Pino.

== Discography ==
- El piano llanero (Fundación Bigott, 2001)
- Piano de Pedro Morales Pino (Banco de la República, 2004)
- El piano llanero II (Fundación Bigott, 2007)
- Piano xarocho (Fundación Arpamerica, 2011)
