= Claudia Czado =

Statistician

Claudia Czado is a mathematical statistician at the Technical University of Munich, known for her research on copulas, vines, and their applications in statistical finance.

== Early life and education ==
Czado grew up in a family with five children in Borken, Hesse, a small town in central Germany. She earned a diploma in 1984 from the University of Göttingen, specializing in probability and statistics. Inspired by a high school fascination with Native American culture, Czado enrolled in an master's-level exchange program between University of Göttingen and Cornell University. At Cornell, she worked with Murad Taqqu in their department of operations research and industrial engineering. Returning to Göttingen, she completed her master's degree in 1987, with a thesis on the law of the iterated logarithm for self-similar processes.

Czado continued to work with Taqqu, and joined the doctoral program in operations research and industrial engineering at Cornell. However, while she was there, Taqqu moved to Boston University. Frustrated with her progress on the law of the iterated logarithm, Czado took advantage of the opportunity to change topics under another advisor. Instead of moving with Taqqu, she remained at Cornell and began working on binary regression using computer simulations. She completed her doctorate at Cornell in 1989. Her dissertation, Link Misspecification and Data Selected Transformations in Binary Regression Models, was supervised by Thomas J. Santner.

== Career ==
After postdoctoral research at McGill University, Czado became a faculty member in the department of mathematics and statistics at York University, Canada, in 1989. In part, she chose Canada over returning to Germany because the German habilitation system would have required more years of effort before she could obtain a permanent position.

After receiving tenure at York in 1994, she went on sabbatical to Germany and began searching for a faculty position in statistics in Germany. In 1998 she took her present position at the Technical University of Munich.

== Books ==
Czado is the author of the textbooks Mathematische Statistik (with Thorsten Schmidt, Springer, 2011) and Analyzing Dependent Data with Vine Copulas: A Practical Guide With R (Springer, 2019).
