= Claudia Langenberg =

German epidemiologist

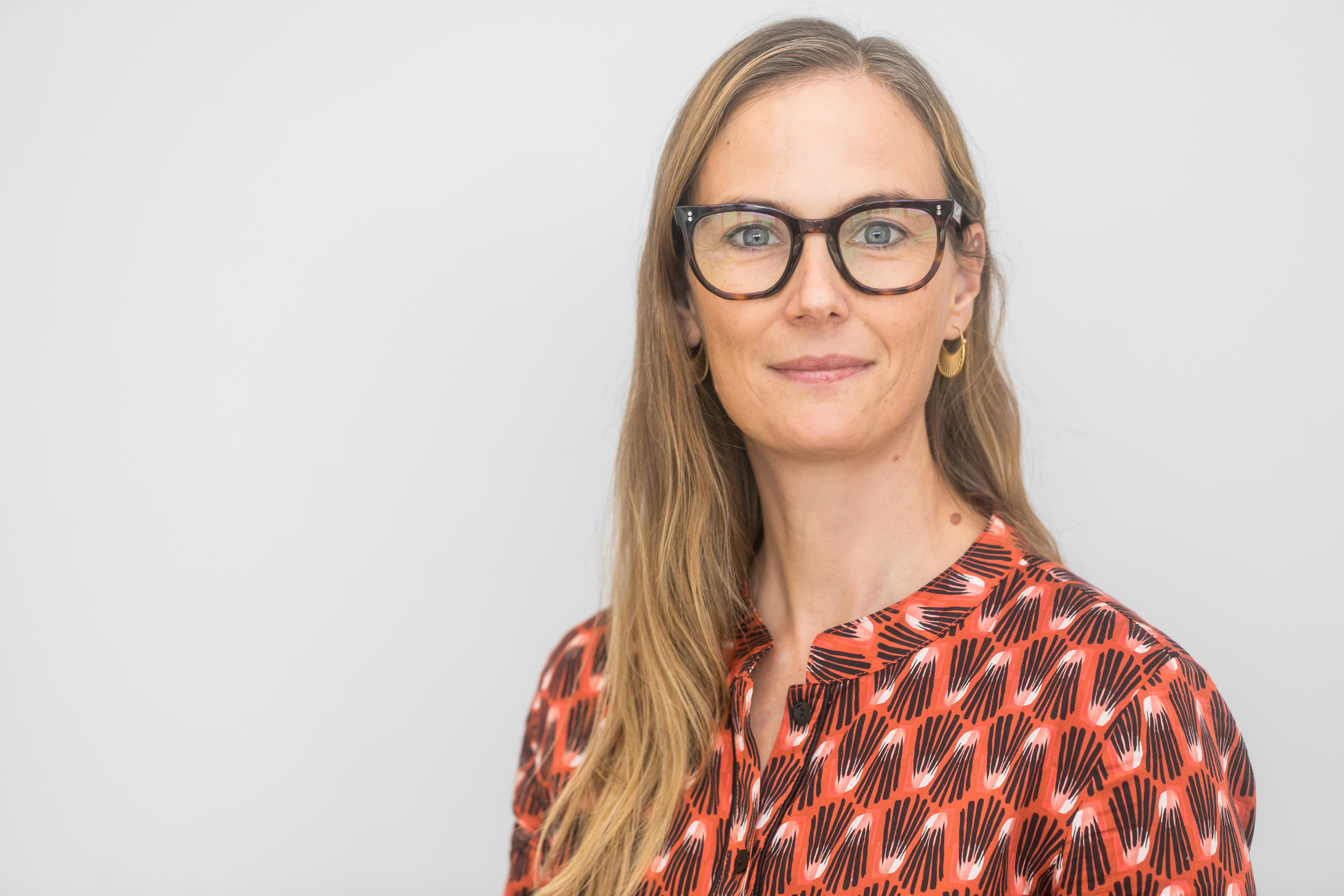
Claudia Langenberg in 2021

Claudia Langenberg (born 1972) is a German epidemiologist and medical specialist who researches and works in the field of public health. She has been a professor of computational medicine at the Berlin Institute of Health (BIH) since 2020.

Claudia is the Director of PHURI and the former programme Leader at the MRC Epidemiology Unit at the University of Cambridge and is a public health specialist combining her expertise with research focused on molecular epidemiology. Her work integrates large-scale genomic and metabolomic data to discover, prioritise and characterize metabolic pathways and test their causal relevance and specificity across a range of diseases, uncovering genetic influences on thousands of molecules in the blood, using this knowledge to better understand human disease such as type 2 diabetes.

== Life and career ==
Claudia Langenberg studied medicine in Münster. After her clinical training and work in Germany, she moved to England for her Master's and PhD in epidemiology at the London School of Hygiene and Tropical Medicine and University College London and completed her specialist training in Public Health in 2016.

Langenberg was also involved in setting up international consortia such as MAGIC (Meta-Analysis of Glucose and Insulin related traits Consortium) and COMETS (Consortium of Metabolomics Studies). She was chief editor of the 2016 report Generation Genome by the UK Chief Medical Officer.

In 2017, Langenberg took over as Program Director of Molecular Epidemiology at the University of Cambridge, where she was previously involved in discovering the genetic basis of metabolic diseases and risk factors.

Prof Langenberg is the Director of Precision Healthcare University Research Institute PHURI at Queen Mary University London. PHURI aims to drive a new era of personalised healthcare from East London which addresses unmet health needs and improves lives locally and globally.

== Research focus ==
The focus of Langenberg's research is on the discovery of genetic influences on so-called 'omic' data, specifically on metabolites circulating in human blood. Her research group integrates data on these metabolites from large-scale population and clinical studies. This is used to characterize the genetic makeup of the human metabolism and its influence on health and disease, such as type 2 diabetes, obesity, and insulin resistance.

== Awards ==
- Helmholtz International Fellow Award, 9 July 2018
- In recognition of Langenberg's achievements as a scientist and researcher, an exhibition plaque was dedicated to her as part of the exhibition "Berlin – Capital of Women Scientists" on the occasion of Wissensstadt Berlin 2021.
- Named in the top 20 scientists in the UK for 2022, 2023, and 2024
- Elected Fellow of the Academy of Medical Sciences (2025)
