= Claudia Toet =

Sint Eustatian politician

Deputy Government Commissioner of Sint Eustatius
- Incumbent
- Assumed office 22 June 2021

Personal details
- Born: The Hague, Netherlands
- Citizenship: Sint Eustatius

Claudia Toet is a Dutch politician from The Hague who was appointed Deputy Government Commissioner of the Caribbean island of St. Eustatius, a special public body of the Netherlands, in 2021.

== Biography ==
Toet was born in The Hague in the mainland Netherlands and spent her childhood there. She worked for ten years for the Municipality of Rotterdam on issues such as at-risk youths, municipal taxes, and law enforcement.

On Sint Eustatius, she first worked as an advisor to its Government Commissioner and as a project manager in the Ministry of the Interior and Kingdom Relations. On 18 June 2021, the Dutch Council of Ministers approved the recommendation of State Secretary for the Interior Raymond Knops and appointed Toet as the Deputy Government Commissioner of Sint Eustatius alongside Government Commissioner Alida Francis. She took office on 22 June and was sworn in by Raymond Knops at a special ceremony held via video conferencing.

== Career ==
In 2021, Toet wrote the foreword of the Statian Nutrition Recipe Booklet, a government-sponsored cookbook which provides information on more healthy and sustainable eating habits and encourages the consumption of local products rather than imports.

On 2 March 2022, Toet and Francis met with members of the Permanent Committee for Kingdom Relations of the Dutch Parliament's Senate. The group discussed solutions to poverty and returning to local democracy. In 2023, Toet resigned as Government Deputy Commissioner to Sint Eustatius in order to take up a role as the Director of the Tax and Customs Administration in the Caribbean Netherlands.
