= Claudia Basrawi =

German actress and writer (born 1962)

- Born: Claudia Basrawi; 7 March 1962 (age 63); Beirut, Lebanon
- Occupation(s): Actress, writer

Claudia Basrawi (born 7 March 1962) is a German actress and writer.

== Early life ==
She was born in Beirut, Lebanon to an Iraqi father and a German mother. Basrawi grew up in the German city of Hannover where she had graduated from. She began her studies in Arabic Philology and Political Science at Berlin in 1982. Soon after completing more studies in Damascus, Syria, she went on to gain a master's degree from the Free University of Berlin.

Since 1994, Basrawi has worked as a writer and gained experience as a screenwriter working alongside Thomas Arslan, Katalin Gődros, and Rainer Knepperges.

In 2004, she began working as a playwright and theater-actress, where she acted in the play entitled "The Swamp – Europe Year Zero" (Der Sumpf – Europa Stunde Null) and in 2006, Basrawi starred in her debut movie, Die Quereinsteigerinnen ("Like in Uruguay").

== Publications ==
- "The World in Which We Lived"
- "Mittelmeer Anämie"

== Filmography ==
- Die Quereinsteigerinnen ("Like in Uruguay") (2005)
- Der Bootgott vom Seesportclub. Die 100 ME – Teil1 (Documentary) (2006)
- Gefangener der Liebe ("Prisoner of Love") (2007)
- Waldmeister (2007)
- Ich begehre (2007)
- Warteschleifen (2010)
- Wettbewerber (2014)
- Weiße Ritter (2015)
- Das Milan Protokoll (2018)
- Shayne (2019)
- Die Angreifbaren (2019)
