= Claudia Malvenuto =

Italian mathematician (born 1965)

Claudia Malvenuto (born 1965) is an Italian mathematician, one of the namesakes of the Malvenuto–Poirier–Reutenauer Hopf algebra of permutations. She is an associate professor of mathematics at Sapienza University of Rome.

== Education ==
Malvenuto was born in Turin. After earning a laurea in mathematics from Sapienza University of Rome in 1988, she went to Canada for doctoral study at Queen's University, but soon transferred to the Université du Québec à Montréal, where she completed her Ph.D. in 1994. Her dissertation, Produits et coproduits des fonctions quasisymétriques et de l’algèbre des descentes [Products and co-products of quasisymmetric functions and of the algebra of descents], was supervised by Christophe Reutenauer. She won the Governor General's Academic Medal in Gold for 1994, for the best doctoral thesis in the sciences in Canada for that year.

== Career ==
After completing her doctorate, she became a high school mathematics teacher in Rome from 1994 to 2000, while also holding a postdoctoral research position at Roma Tre University from 1995 to 1997. In 2000 she obtained an academic position as an assistant professor of computer science at Sapienza University, and finally in 2012 she was able to obtain a position as an assistant professor of mathematics at Sapienza University. In 2016 she became an associate professor of mathematics at Sapienza University.
