= Claudia Peus =

German Leadership Scholar and University Manager

Claudia Peus (born 1977 in Frankfurt am Main) is a German leadership and management scholar. She is board member of the Technical University of Munich (TUM) and founding director of the TUM Institute for LifeLong Learning. In her role as Senior Vice President, Peus is responsible for the development and implementation of TUM's strategies in the areas of talent management and diversity taking into account both the university's more than 11,800 employees, and external executives and professionals.

== Life ==
Peus received scholarships from the Konrad Adenauer Foundation as well as the German Academic Scholarship Foundation for her studies in psychology and economics. After completing her doctorate at the chair of Dieter Frey at LMU Munich, she worked as a Visiting Scholar at the Sloan School of Management, Massachusetts Institute of Technology and as a Post-Doctoral Fellow at Harvard University. She was appointed Professor of Research and Science Management at the Technical University of Munich in May 2011. Since October 2017, she has been part of the university's Board of Management, serving as Senior Vice President for Talent Management and Diversity. Since December 2019, she has served as founding director of the TUM Institute for LifeLong Learning. In 2020, Peus was included in the list of "Germany's Most Inspiring Women".

== Areas of work ==
In her research, Peus focuses on leadership and leadership development in the digital age, the management of research organizations as well as diversity in organizations. She contributed to these areas of knowledge to an international scientific audience with more than 100 journal articles and over 60 book chapters.

Peus shows that in a fast changing and unpredictable world, leaders not only need a sound understanding of the latest technological advancements but also a profound understanding of basic human needs and how to cater to them. Peus' research shows that self-reflection is the crucial point through which individuals, but also entire teams, can foster development. According to Peus, every manager should develop an internal value compass, consider values he or she wants to stand for and communicate them clearly.

Peus transfers her knowledge on leadership, diversity, and talent management by consulting boards and executives of numerous companies of different sizes, from DAX companies as BMW, Infineon, and SAP to small and medium-sized organizations, family-owned businesses and start-ups. Peus also actively shares her insights from research as a member of various boards, such as the management board of RWI - Leibniz Institute for Economic Research, the board of trustees of the German "Wertekommission" and the Max Planck Institute for Physics.

Through numerous media contributions in international and national magazines such as The Times, New York Magazine, Huffington Post, Die Zeit, Süddeutsche Zeitung, Handelsblatt or Wirtschaftswoche and appearances on public broadcasters such as arte, Deutschlandfunk or Bayerischer Rundfunk, she regularly contributes to the transfer of knowledge from science to society.

In her role as founding director of the TUM Institute for LifeLong Learning, Peus aims to make the latest findings of all research fields at the Technical University of Munich accessible to professionals through continuing education programs.
