= Claudia Caballero Chávez =

Mexican politician (born 1982)

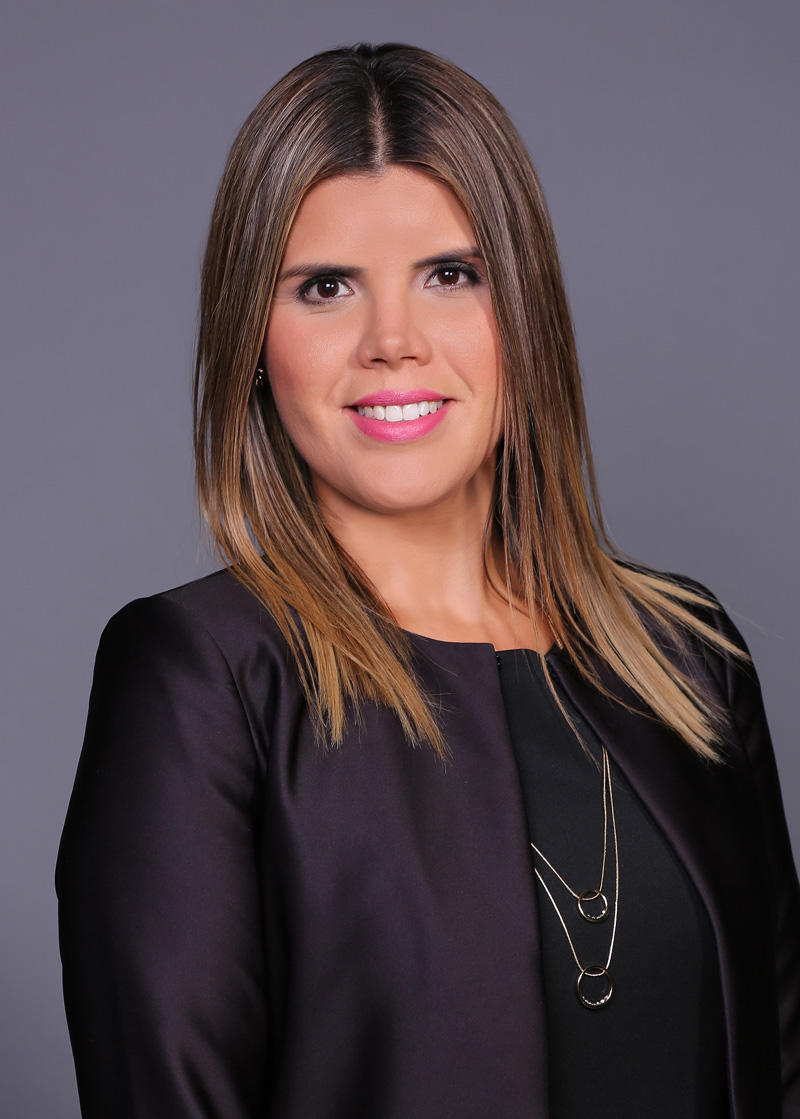
- Born: 13 December 1982 (age 43); Nuevo León, Mexico
- Occupation: Politician
- Political party: PAN

Claudia Gabriela Caballero Chávez (born 13 December 1982) is a Mexican politician from the National Action Party. From 2006 to 2009 she served as Deputy of the LX Legislature of the Mexican Congress representing Nuevo León.
