= Claudia Vaca =

Bolivian writer

Claudia Vaca (born 1984), full name Claudia Cecilia Vaca Flores, is a poet, fiction writer, essayist, and educator from Santa Cruz, Bolivia.

== Biography ==
=== Early life ===
Vaca was born in Santa Cruz de la Sierra. She was raised, along with two brothers and three sisters, by her mother, Nuesa Rosely Vaca. The family has roots in the state of Mato Grosso in Brazil and in the town of Roboré in the Chiquitos Province, where Vaca lived for a time as a child with her grandmother Pilar Flores, a Chiquitana schoolteacher.

=== Education and career ===
Vaca obtained a degree in philology and a diploma in university teaching from the Gabriel René Moreno Autonomous University (UAGRM). She later moved to Chile to undertake graduate studies at the Catholic University of the Most Holy Conception, culminating in a doctoral project focusing on oral memory in the Chiquitana ecoregion of Bolivia. She has worked as a language and literature teacher at the primary school, secondary school, and university levels.

Vaca's poetry has been published in a wide range of literary journals and anthologies and partially reunited in poetry collections from editorial houses based in Bolivia, Uruguay, and Chile. Her essays and opinion pieces have been published in Bolivian and Chilean journals such as El Deber and El Mostrador.

=== Marriage ===
Vaca is married to Veranika Lis, a martial arts and meditation trainer from Belarus. The pair have collaborated in creating and leading workshops in Santiago de Chile, Santa Cruz, and La Paz that combine the exploration of literature and meditative practices.

== Published works ==
=== Poetry collections ===
Versos de Agua (El País, 2008)

Como vuelan las mariposas (La Hoguera, 2013)

Incendio en el agua (Editorial 3600, 2018)

Pasaporte (Andesgraund, 2019)

Pasaporte de un eLector: poemario para escribir (La Hoguera, 2019)

=== Novel ===
Diálogos del silencio (La Hoguera, 2017)

=== Literary criticism ===
El libro es un territorio y el lector un habitante (Universidad Alberto Hurtado-Chile and Museo de Historia UAGRM, 2019)

Crónicas de lectores (Ediciones Étcetera, Chile),

Ethos Lector (Botella al Mar-Uruguay and UAH-Chile)

== Recognition ==
Vaca's poetry collection Como vuelan las mariposas was designated a 2013-2014 Recommended Book by the Academia Boliviana de Literatura Infantil y Juvenil.

Vaca was the first woman from Santa Cruz to be inducted into the Academia Boliviana de Literatura Infantil y Juvenil, a national nonprofit institution for the preservation and research of literature written for children and adolescents in Bolivia.
