= Claudia Levy =

American journalist and union activist (1944–2021)

- Born: December 24, 1943; Galveston, Texas, U.S.
- Died: December 3, 2021 (aged 77); Bethesda, Maryland, U.S.
- Occupations: journalist, editor
- Employer: The Washington Post

Claudia Dale Levy (December 24, 1943 – December 3, 2021) was an American journalist and union activist who worked at The Washington Post in the 1980s and 1990s.

== Early life ==
Claudia Levy was born in Galveston, Texas, the daughter of Sidney Alexander Levy and Virginia Dale Clark Levy. She was raised in the Washington, D.C. area and graduated from Bethesda-Chevy Chase High School in 1961. Both of her parents worked in journalism.

== Career and activism ==
Levy edited the real estate and regional Maryland Weekly sections at The Washington Post. She approved a two-part investigative series by Eugene L. Meyer in 1980, on white flight in Prince George's County, Maryland. The piece received an honorable mention from the National Association of Home Builders.

In 1972 she was head of a committee of over 100 women employees of The Post when they filed a complaint with the Equal Employment Opportunity Commission. The complaint was settled in 1980, with the employees receiving some back pay and other concessions. "It's strictly token back pay. But the affirmative action element is promising," Levy commented after the settlement was reached. In 1986, she was a lead plaintiff in a class action lawsuit representing employees of The Washington Post who sued the newspaper for overtime pay.

Levy wrote obituaries for The Washington Post for twelve years. "People can be incredibly angry when they call with a news obit," she told a reporter in 1995. "We try to be precise, and it makes some people mad." She was one of about 130 Washington Post staffers who accepted the Voluntary Retirement Incentive Program to take an early retirement in late 2003.

== Personal life ==
Levy died from an embolism following cervical spine surgery on December 3, 2021, at her home in the Bannockburn community of Bethesda, Maryland. She was 77 years old. At the time of her death, she was caring for both of her aged parents in her home.
