= Claudia Johnson =

Claudia Johnson may refer to:

- Lady Bird Johnson (Claudia Alta Taylor Johnson, 1912–2007), First Lady of the United States during the presidency of her husband Lyndon B. Johnson
- Claudia L. Johnson, American professor of English literature
- Claudia Durst Johnson, literary scholar
