= Claudia Fernández (footballer) =

Spanish footballer (born 2003)

Personal information
- Full name: Claudia Fernández Azpeitia
- Date of birth: 11 July 2003 (age 23)
- Place of birth: San Sebastián, Spain
- Positions: Midfielder; forward

Team information
- Current team: Athletic Club

Youth career
- 2017–2018: Añorga

Senior career*
Years	Team	Apps	(Gls)
2018–2020	Real Sociedad B		
2020–2022	Real Sociedad	9	(0)
2022–	Athletic Club B	66	(4)
2025–	Athletic Club	4 (Note: The BDFutbol website records Fernández as appearing in a fixture between Athletic and Real Sociedad in February 2025, but other sources confirm it was Maitane Vilariño who took part.)	(0)
- * Club domestic league appearances and goals as of 25 July 2025

Claudia Fernández Azpeitia (born 11 July 2003) is a Spanish footballer who plays as a midfielder or forward for Athletic Club.

== Club career ==
Fernández started her career at Añorga. Although she had made nine top division appearances with hometown club Real Sociedad as a teenager before joining Athletic in July 2022, she played only for the Bilbao side's B-team until her debut against Barcelona in January 2025.
