= Claudia Wagner =

German model (born 1979)

- Born: 23 December 1979 (age 45); Wesel, Germany
- Occupation: Model
- Modeling information
- Height: 1.80 m (5 ft 11 in)
- Hair color: Brown
- Eye color: Blue

Claudia Wagner (born 23 December 1979) is a German model and the Co-Founder of UBOOKER. She was born in Wesel, Germany and began modeling at the age of 19 after being discovered by a photographer in a McDonald's near her hometown, Wetter.

After living in Paris and London she has adopted New York City as her home.

In addition to the covers of Marie Claire and Elle she was also the face for campaigns such as Armani, Chanel Cosmetics, L'Oréal and Lierac Advertising Campaign 2007–2008, all major European and US publications. She is noted for her perfect blue eyes and symmetric features. She is represented by UBOOKER in New York and London, Elite Model Management in Milan, Karin Models in Paris. In 2016 she co-founded UBOOKER, a digital platform named the Uber of the Modeling industry together with fellow model and friend Diana Dietrich.
