= Claudia Müller =

Claudia Müller may refer to:

- Claudia Müller (footballer) (born 1974), German footballer
- Claudia Müller (politician) (born 1981), German politician

== See also ==
- Claudia Müller-Ebeling (born 1956), German anthropologist and art historian
