= Claudia Cruz Santiago =

Mexican politician

- Born: 25 February 1967 (age 59); Mexico City, Mexico
- Occupation: Politician
- Political party: PRD

Claudia Lilia Cruz Santiago (born 25 February 1967) is a Mexican politician from the Party of the Democratic Revolution. From 2006 to 2009 she served as Deputy of the LX Legislature of the Mexican Congress representing the Federal District.
