= Claudia Alvarez (artist) =

Mexican American artist

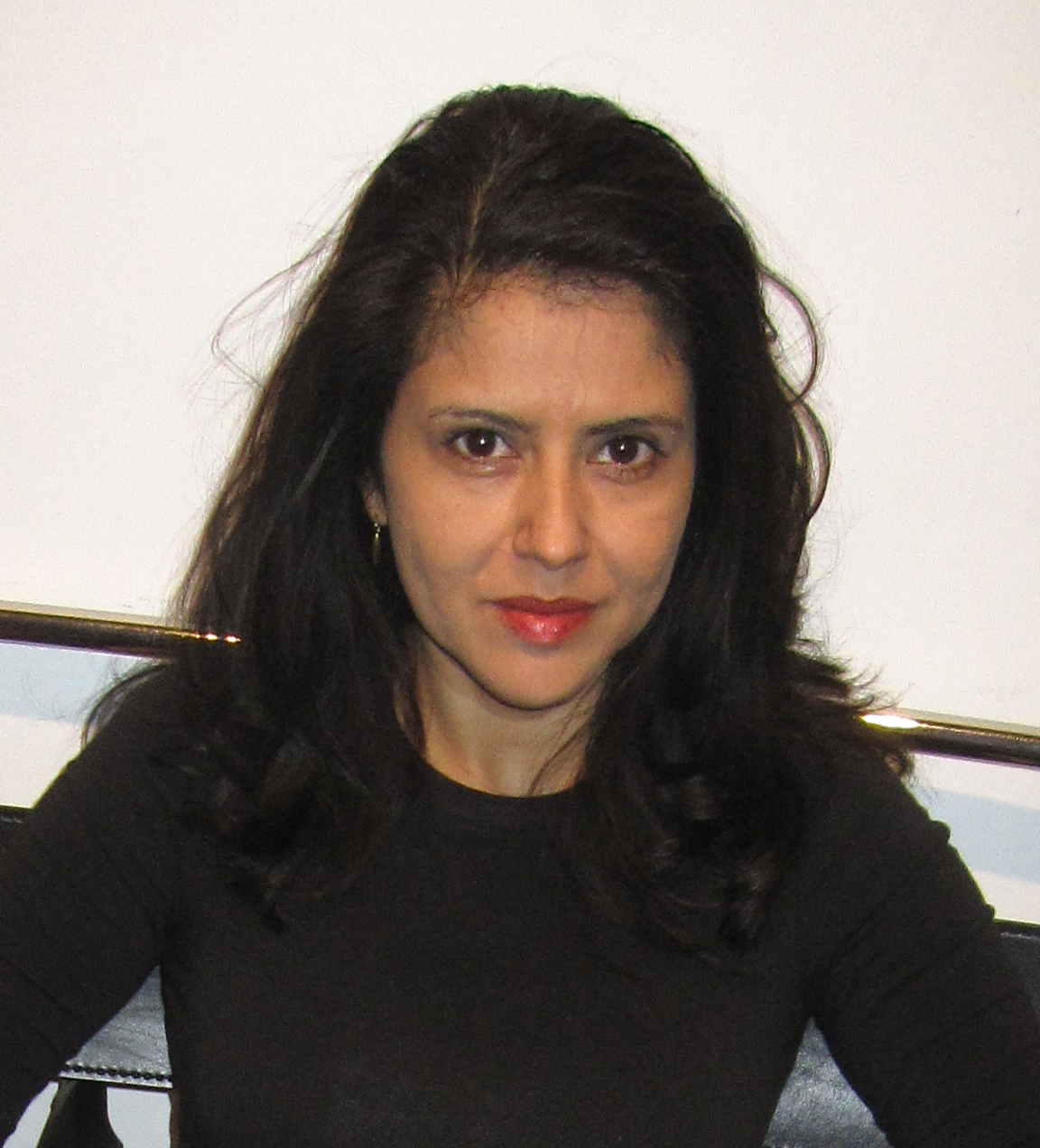

Claudia Alvarez (born 1969) is a Mexican American painter and sculptor who has worked as an artist in residence in Mexico, Switzerland, France, and China. Alvarez's solo exhibitions include Claudia Álvarez: A Moment in Between at the Acércate at the National Arts Centre, Mexico City; Girls with Guns, Scott White Contemporary Art, La Jolla, California; Falling, Museum of Nebraska Art, Kearney, Nebraska; Silence Water, Museum of Art Contemporary Yucatán, Mérida; American Heroes, Blue Leaf Gallery, Dublin; Things of a Child, The Latino Museum, Omaha, Nebraska; and History of Immigration, Metropolitan Community College, Omaha, Nebraska. Alvarez is based in New York City.

== Early life and education ==
Claudia Alvarez was born in Monterrey, Nuevo León, Mexico in 1969 and raised in California from the age of three. Alvarez attended Sacramento City College from 1987 to 1997, and the University of California Davis and the California College of Arts, Oakland from 2000 to 2003. She received a BA in Art Studio from the University of California, Davis in 1999 and an MFA in Ceramics from the California College of the Arts, San Francisco in 2003.

During the time Alvarez was in High School, she worked as a patient transporter at the UC Davis Medical Center. Alvarez enjoyed developing relationships with her patients, "to make them laugh, for even five minutes, inspired me to think about life in different ways." While taking pre-med courses at Sacramento City College, Alvarez enrolled in a ceramics class that made her rethink her existing artistic practice. Alvarez says, "I felt an experience of touch that I hadn't experienced with drawing or painting -- a physical reality." Not long after Alvarez went from pre-med to art and applied to UC Davis, where she worked with Annabeth Rosen, the Robert Arneson Endowed Chair, and the painter Wayne Thiebaud.

== Art ==
Alvarez creates child-sized figures made of fired ceramics and are painted in layers. Touch is considered to be a dominant feature in the modeling and painting of these life-sized figures. Alvarez's work modulates "between naive and wise, cute and threatening, adorable and pitiful. They enact relationships most associated with adults or young adults in thematic tableau or candid theater." Alvarez models and paints her sculptures with eastern and western traditions in mind; both of which she adopted from her teachers Arthur Gonzalez at California College of Art and Wayne Thiebaud at University of California, Davis. Alvarez's sculptures engage with the audience as if through a child's perspective, thereby emphasizing the corruption of social conventions and mechanisms. "We feel the presence of the hand on the child's body. The poking, pinching, smoothing and wiping of clay transports us instantly into the emotional body. Alvarez's environments encourage an intimate dialogue between the objects, their relationship to space, and the viewer" writes fellow artist Terry Rosenberg, continuing, "The sculptures of Claudia Alvarez engages in subjects such as immigration, violence, youth/aging, and power struggles."

Alvarez's work has been exhibited in the United States, Canada, Europe, and Mexico. Her work has also appeared in several journals, including the New American Paintings, The Irish Times, and Art Pulse. Her solo exhibitions include Girls with Guns at the Scott White Contemporary Art in La Jolla, California, Falling at the Museum of Nebraska Art, and Silencio de Agua at the Museo de Arte Contemporaneo de Yucatan, Mérida, Mexico.

Alvarez's solo exhibition, Girls with Guns, includes a series of four oil paintings, a large watercolor depicting girls playing with guns, and 14 childlike sculptures of children role-playing. She represents children without clothing or barely clothed at all in rigorous stances creating a strong focus on the violence that shadows American culture. "They are smaller than life-sized or the sizes of infants, increasing the psychological sense that these are, in fact, defenseless little humans and their fighting or bullying each other demonstrates learned behavior," says Jan Garden Castro.

Claudia Alvarez comments that audiences sometimes find her work challenging, but goes on to explain, "through the eyes, through the marks, they realize the subject matter is important and needs to be talked about. It sends a message about what's happening in the world."

== Selected exhibitions ==
Selected Solo Exhibitions:

Claudia Alvarez Acércate, CENART, Centro Nacional de las Artes, Mexico City, Mexico (2014)

Girls with Guns, Scott White Contemporary Art, La Jolla, California (2012)

History of Immigration, Metropolitan Community College, Omaha, Nebraska

Close Your Eyes, White Space, West Palm Beach, Florida (2 person show) (2011)

Claudia Alvarez, Falling, Museum of Nebraska Art, University of Nebraska, Kearney, Nebraska (2011)

Quemando Recuerdos, Da Burn Gallery, Mérida, Yucatán, Mexico

La Tormenta, La Clinica Arte Contemporaneo, Mérida, Yucatán, Mexico

Claudia Alvarez: El Silencio Del Agua, Museo de Arte Contemporaneo Ateneo de Yucatan, Mérida, Mexico (2008)

Cosas de Un Niño, El Museo Latino, Omaha, Nebraska (2005)

RED, Labrys Contemporary Arts, Long Beach, California (2004)

The Bruised Sky, Gallery W, Sacramento, California (2003)

Sojourn, FUTUR, Rapperswil, Switzerland (2002)

Azulear, Annex Gallery, Biola University, Los Angeles, California (2001)

Azulear, Puccinelli Gallery, Gutenberg College, Eugene, Oregon

Selected Group Exhibitions:

Your Making Me Uncomfortable: Perspectives on Controversial Art, Sheldon Museum of Art, Lincoln Nebraska (2016)

Mujeres, Museum of Nebraska Art, Kearney, Nebraska

New Ways of Seeing: Beyond Culture, Dorsky Gallery, New York City (2015)

In Pursuit of Freedom, Corridor Gallery, Brooklyn, New York

Migrantes: Claudia Alvarez, Jose Bedia, Ilya y Emilia Kabakov, Nina Menocal, Mexico City MX

Pushing Boundaries, White Space, The Mordes Collection, West Palm Beach, Florida

Its Surreal Thing: The Temptation of Objects, Sheldon Museum of Art, Lincoln, Nebraska (2013)

The Figure, Keramik Museum, Westerwald, Höhr-Grenzhausen, Germany

Stump, Hunter College Project Space, New York, NY

Brooklyn Museum GO Open Studios, Brooklyn, New York (2012)

Separation Anxiety, Pelham Art Center, Pelham, New York

Better Half, Better Twelfth: Women Artists in the Collection, Sheldon Museum of Art, NE (2010)

Provisions, Nathan Cummings Foundation, New York, NY

Separation Anxiety, Wignall Museum of Contemporary Art, Chaffey College, CA

Wildly Different Things, The Observatory, Dublin, Ireland

Vida Breve, National Museum of Mexican Art, Chicago, Illinois

Panopticon, Lied Art Gallery, Creighton University, Omaha, Nebraska (2009)

Resident Artists, Galerie Aqui Siam Ben, Vallauris, France

Tiempo Y Espacio, Museo de la Ciudad, Mérida, Mexico (2008)

Salty: Three Tales of Sorrow, El Camino College Art Gallery, Torrance, California (2007)

Line by Line, Sheldon Memorial Art Gallery, Lincoln, Nebraska

== Awards and residencies ==
Money for Women/Barbara Deming Memorial Fund, New York City

SASAMA, Shizuoka, Japan (2015)

Art Matters Foundation, New York, New York

The McKnight Foundation, Artist in Residence, Northern Clay Center, MN

Artista en Residencia, SOMA, Mexico City, Mexico (2014)

Vytlacil Artist in Residence, Arts Student League of New York, New York City (2011)

PV Art, Puerto Vallarta, Mexico (2009)

Gruber Jez Foundation, Cholul, Mexico (2008)

Visiting Artist, China Century Entertainment Inc., Shanghai, China (2006)

Artist in Residence, Bemis Center for Contemporary Arts, Omaha, Nebraska (2005)

Artist in Residency, FUTUR, Rapperswil, Switzerland, Jan-July (2002)
