= Claudia E. Zapata =

American artist

Claudia E Zapata is a Queer Chicanx artist and curator known as one of the co-founders of the Puro Chingón Collective, which develops BIPOC zines and designer toys. In 2023, Zapata became the first associate curator of Latino Art at the Blanton Museum in Austin, Texas.

== Biography ==
Claudia E Zapata is a Texas-based artist known for their DIY toy designs and zines. Most of their artwork is in connection to the Puro Chingón Collective which they co-founded in 2012 with Claudia Aparicio-Gamundi and James Huizar. The Puro Chingón Collective is a big part of their artistic identity and is the first place in which they felt comfortable to call themselves an artist. Zapata's artwork both in and outside of the collective have represented and discussed topics involving the LGBTIQ+ community and the Chicanx community. Although, a lot of their art is in connection to the Puro Chingón Collective, Zapata also works as an independent artist. The topics of otherness and queerness are important to Zapata and are often the center of their artwork, published articles and activism. They use their platform to voice concerns and issues pressing the communities they are involved with.

Zapata earned their PhD in Art History from Southern Methodist University, and they had previously received the BA and MA in Art History from the University of Texas, Austin. They were Curatorial Assistant of Latinx Art at the Smithsonian American Art Museum (SAAM) in Washington, D.C. and had been actively associated with SAAM since 2018. Aside from their work with SAAM, they have curated over 30 exhibitions in Mexic-Arte Museum and other museums.

== Selected works ==
=== Mapache Bear (2014) ===
The Mapache Bear is one of the first sculptures Zapata created as part of the Puro Chingón Collective emerging series Chingolandia. The Mapache Bear is more than a sculpture, it is a character. According to Zapata, this character of theirs is half raccoon and half bear and first started out as an experiment when they began to cultivate ideas. But as the Mapache Bear came to be, Zapata describes it as a “self-cultural identification of my experience as a Queer Chicanx.”

=== Wonderful, Amazing, Stunning, Phenomenal, Fiesta (2013) ===
Aside from Zapata and the other members of the Puro Chingón Collective taking part to create designer toys and zines, the collective also take on other projects such as the Wonderful, Amazing, Stunning, Phenomenal, Fiesta public mural. The mural project was completed in 2013. The mural sits in Austin, TX and was also funded by the Downtown Austin Alliance. This piece depicts the city life of downtown Austin and captures the various people that make downtown Austin as lively as it is.

=== Mundo Zurdo (2017) ===
The piece Mundo Zurdo was designed and sculpted by Zapata in 2017 as part of the Puro Chingón Collective's Let’s Get Weird series. This piece is also considered to be a part of collective's Chingolandia designer toys. It is a hand-cast and hand-painted piece of acrylic on resin.

== Project & exhibitions ==
- Puro Chingón Collective (2012–present) is a project in which Zapata co-founded along with Claudia Aparicio-Gamundi and James Huizar.
- The Let's Get Weird (2017) Puro Chingón Collective exhibition was a part of ChingoZine 7 release party that took place in Austin, Texas.
- Designer toys of the Puro Chingón Collective were featured in the 2019 Expressiones en Esculturas exhibition.
- Zapata's artwork “El Zine: Contemporary Underground Archives” was featured in the Latinx Project in 2019 New York, NY.
