= Claudia Mora =

Geoscientist

Claudia Mora is an American academic. She is the dean of the Jackson School of Geosciences at the University of Texas at Austin and holds the John A. and Katherine G. Jackson Decanal Chair in the Geosciences.

== Early life and education ==
Mora attended the University of New Mexico for undergraduate studies. It was in New Mexico that her interest was sparked in the field of geosciences when Mora embarked on a field mapping trip with her older sister. After graduation, Mora went on to complete a masters degree at Rice University. Mora completed her PhD in 1988 and received her degree from the Department of Geoscience at the University of Wisconsin - Madison focusing in stable isotope analysis.

== Career ==
Mora was a professor at the University of Tennessee, Knoxville, where she was the first woman to join the faculty in the department of geosciences. She then served at the Los Alamos National Laboratory as the chemistry division leader. In 2020, Mora was appointed as dean of the Jackson School of Geosciences and the John A. and Katherine G. Jackson Decanal Chair in the Geosciences at the University of Texas at Austin.

Mora was president of the Geological Society of America from 2016 until 2017.

== Awards and honors ==
In 2018 the University of Wisconsin-Madison named Mora a distinguished alumna.

== Selected publications ==
- Mora, Claudia I.; Driese, Steven G.; Colarusso, Lee Ann (1996-02-23). "Middle to Late Paleozoic Atmospheric CO 2 Levels from Soil Carbonate and Organic Matter". Science. 271 (5252): 1105–1107. Bibcode:1996Sci...271.1105M. doi:10.1126/science.271.5252.1105. ISSN 0036-8075. S2CID 128479221.
- Miller, D. L.; Mora, C. I.; Grissino-Mayer, H. D.; Mock, C. J.; Uhle, M. E.; Sharp, Z. (2006-09-26). "Tree-ring isotope records of tropical cyclone activity". Proceedings of the National Academy of Sciences. 103 (39): 14294–14297. Bibcode:2006PNAS..10314294M. doi:10.1073/pnas.0606549103. ISSN 0027-8424. PMC 1570183. PMID 16984996.
- Mora, Claudia I.; Valley, John W. (1989-08-01). "Halogen-rich scapolite and biotite; implications for metamorphic fluid-rock interaction". American Mineralogist. 74 (7–8): 721–737. ISSN 0003-004X.
