= Claudia Kreuzig Grinnell =

German-American poet writing in English

Claudia Kreuzig Grinnell is a German-American poet writing in English.

== Biography ==
Claudia Kreuzig Grinnell was born and raised in Germany. She now teaches at the University of Louisiana at Monroe. Her poems have appeared in publications such as The Kenyon Review, Exquisite Corpse, Hayden's Ferry Review, New Orleans Review, Review Americana, Triplopia, Logos, Minneota Review, Diner, Urban Spaghetti, Fine Madness, Greensboro Review and others. Her first full-length book of poetry, Conditions Horizontal, was published by Missing Consonant Press in the fall of 2001. Grinnell was the recipient of the 2000 Southern Women Writers Emerging Poets Award. In 2003, she was a finalist in the Ann Stanford Poetry Prize Competition, and in 2005, she received the Louisiana Division of the Arts Fellowship in poetry.

In 2006, she appeared, along with klipschutz (pen name of Kurt Lipschutz), Jon Cone and Albert Sgambati in the collectible handbound poetry volume All Roads...but This One, which appeared in an edition of 150 with 26 additional copies featuring individual collages by Colette Jappy.
