= Claudia Coari =

Quechua politician in Peru

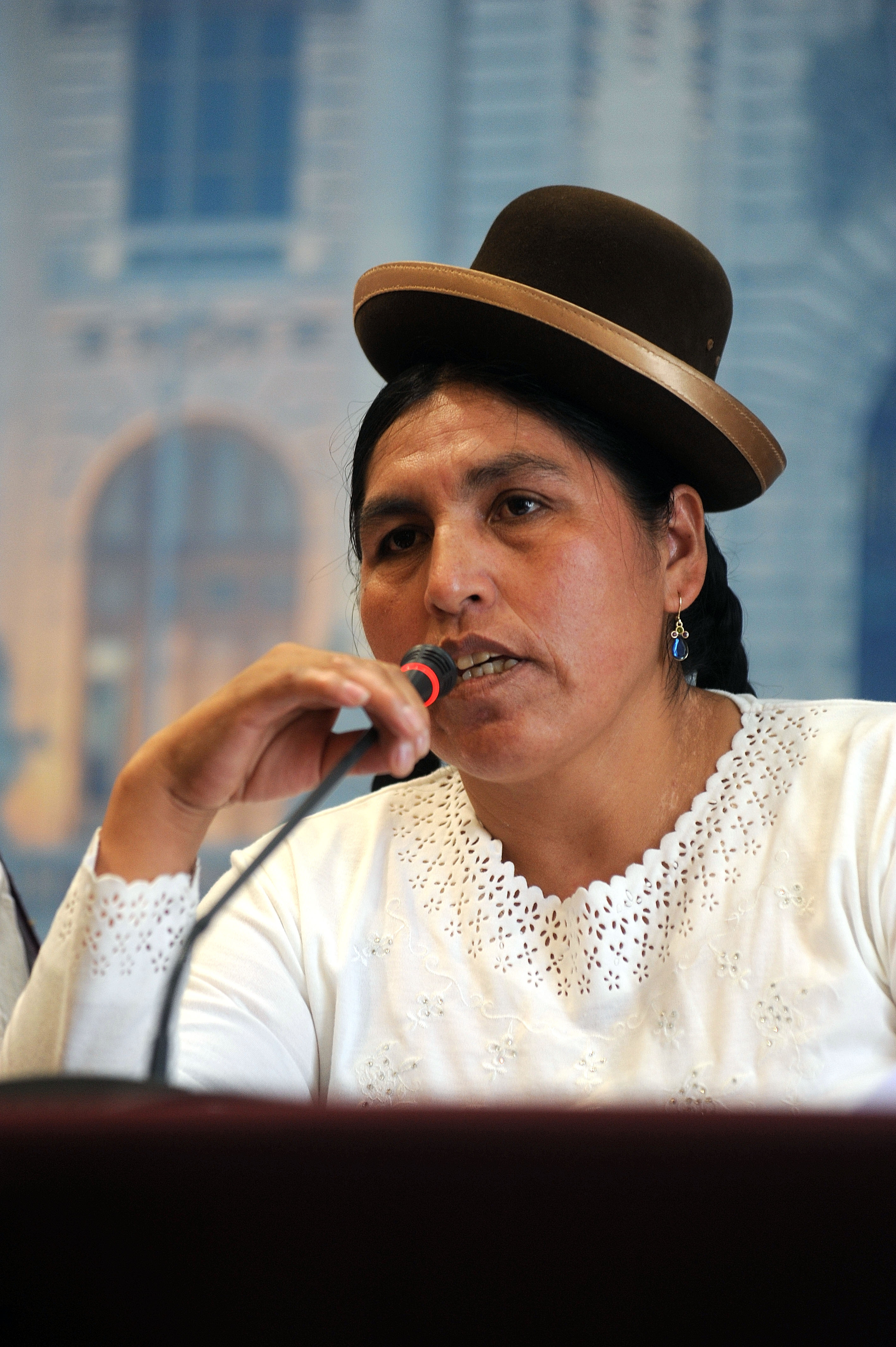
- Coari Mamani in 2012

Congress of the Republic of Peru
- In office 2011–2014

Personal details
- Born: Claudia Coari Mamani; 1967 (age 58–59) Peru
- Party: Peruvian Nationalist Party

Claudia Coari Mamani (born 1967) is a Quechua politician in Peru. She was a member of the Congress of the Republic of Peru between 2011 and 2014, representing the Peruvian Nationalist Party (Partido Nacional Peruano), but was no longer a congresswoman by March 2018.

In 2018 she was part of a delegation of indigenous women leaders from 10 countries in South America who traveled to Chile for the launch of a Food and Agriculture Organization campaign to eradicate hunger. She stressed the importance of family farms for food security, saying that in her area women took on most of this work.

She was congratulated by Bolivian president Evo Morales for wearing the indigenous pollera colourful woollen skirt in Congress, with pride in her heritage.

== Early life ==
She was born in the Escallani community in the Capachica District, located in the Department of Puno, on February 26, 1967. She was orphaned at five months old, and raised by her grandparents and aunt.

Unlike some other children in the village, she attended primary school, about a two-hour walk away, and then secondary school in Chapa, near Chapachica, which was even further. While there, she joined a local Maryknoll Catholic women's group at the parish in Chapachica. When she was 12, she became a Christian youth leader, and remained active in her parish's leadership for many years.

Later, Coari was elected delegate of the Puno Departmental Federation of Peasants (FDCP), a branch of the Peruvian Peasant Confederation (CCP), and later become the organization's Secretary of Economy. Since then, she has been active in the CCP.

During these years, she gave birth to a daughter, whom she raised as a single mother. Coari earned her living as a market vendor. While in Juliaca with her daughter, who was helping with sales at the market, she received a call from Ollanta Humala of the Peruvian Nationalist Party (PNP), who asked if she, the market vendor and CCP farmers' leader, would be willing to run for Congress of the Puno region in the 2011 Peruvian Elections for the Peru Wins (Gana Perú) electoral alliance. Surprised by this offer, she eventually agreed.

== Congressional career ==
In the 2011 elections, she ran for Congress with the Gana Perú coalition and was elected for the 2011-2026 parliamentary term.

Among the priorities she set as a member of the parliament were mining, environmental protection, and food sovereignty. Bills she introduced on these priorities included "Laws on Prior Consultation of Indigenous Peoples", which is significant for planning mining projects in Indigenous territories and complies with International Labour Convention 169. This law was passed by the Peruvian Congress on August 23, 2011. Other bills she introduced included the "Law on the Protection of Lake Titicaca" and the "Law on Supporting Family Small-Scale Farming to Ensure Food Sovereignty", both of which were also passed by Congress.

Notably, she used her native tongue, Quechua, to address the parliament on several occasions.

In March 2018, she announced her political intention to run for governor of the Puno Region. She did not win the seat.

In the 2021 Peruvian elections to the Andean Parliament, Coari ran for the Together for Peru electoral alliance. She said that if elected, she will propose promoting food sovereignty in the five Latin American countries integrated with this international group.

However, with 737, 889 votes or 6.987%, she did not win any of the five seats.
