= Claudia Schubert =

German mezzo-soprano concert singer

- Born: Darmstadt, Germany
- Education: Musikhochschule Frankfurt
- Occupation: Classical mezzo-soprano

Claudia Schubert is a German mezzo-soprano concert singer.

Born in Darmstadt, Schubert studied voice at the Hochschule für Musik und Darstellende Kunst Frankfurt with Elsa Cavelti from 1986 to 1992. She has collaborated and recorded with conductors including Frieder Bernius, Ton Koopman and John Eliot Gardiner.
