= Claudia Smigrod =

American photographer

Claudia Smigrod (born 1949 in New York City) is an American artist and educator known for her photography and book art. She attended Alfred University and the George Washington University. She taught at the Corcoran School of the Arts and Design from 1982 through 2016, and is now Professor Emerita.

Smigrod's work is in the collection of the National Museum of Women in the Arts (NMWA), the Smithsonian American Art Museum, the University of Arizona Libraries, Special Collections, the University of Michigan Library,

In 2009 the Corcoran Gallery of Art held an exhibition of her work entitled Neighborhood Watch. In 2022 an exhibition of her work entitled Paper Light was held at the American University Museum.
