= Claudia Larochelle =

Canadian journalist and radio host

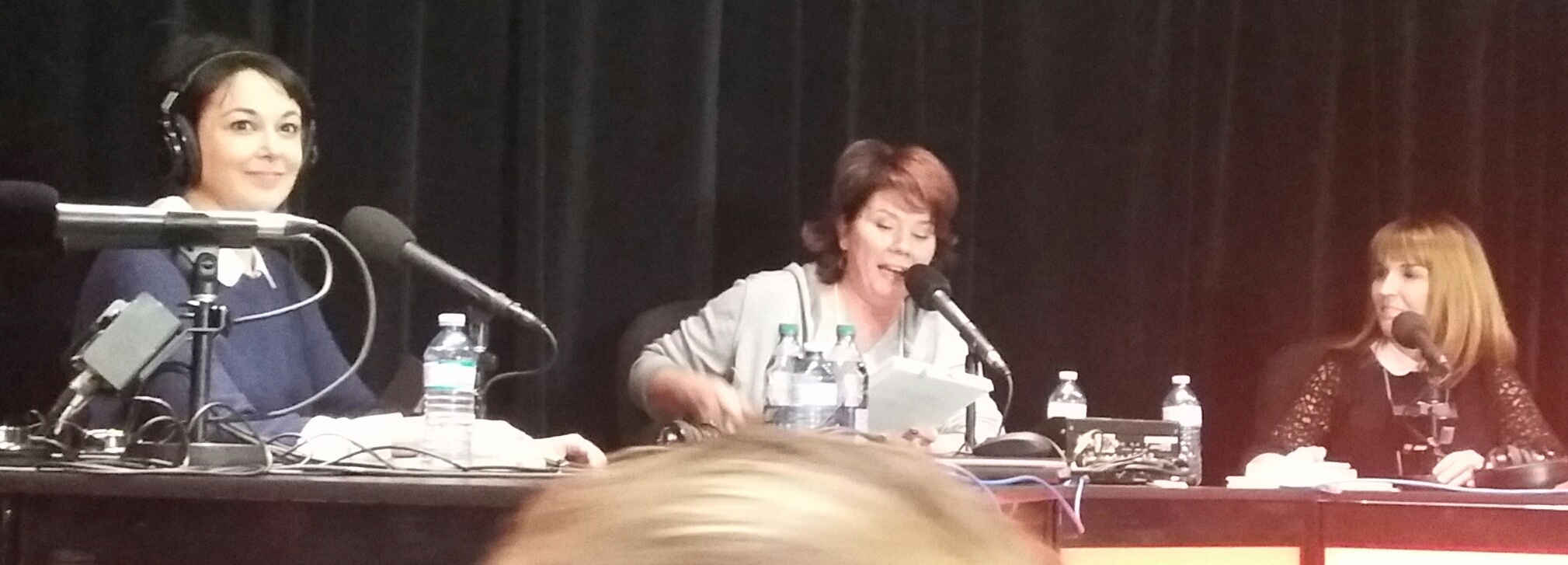
- Valérie Guibbaud, Marina Orsini and Claudia Larochelle at the 2015 Montreal Book Fair
- Born: 1978 (age 46–47)
- Education: Masters in creative writing
- Alma mater: Université du Québec à Montréal
- Occupations: Journalist, radio host, writer

Claudia Larochelle (born 1978) is a Québécoise journalist, radio host and writer. After a college training in theatre, a bachelor's degree in journalism and a master's degree in creative writing from the Université du Québec à Montréal (UQAM), she interned as a cultural columnist for the electronic journal Rue Frontenac (in French) and made appearances on different media, including on Radio-Canada.

Since autumn 2012, Larochelle has hosted LIRE, a literary magazine broadcast on ARTV. She was also a cultural columnist on 98.5 FM and wrote articles in numerous publications.

Larochelle is the author of Les bonnes filles plantent des fleurs au printemps (English: The Good Girls Plant Flowers in Spring). She co-directed, with Elsa Pépin, the publication Amour & libertinage par les trentenaires d'aujourd'hui (Love and debauchery by the thirty-something of today).

Larochelle has been involved in teaching and children's literature, having collaborated in the Premières amours (First Love) collection published by La Courte Échelle. In autumn 2014, she published the novel Les îles Canaries (The Canary Islands) in the Vol 459 series of VLB publications.

Leading up to the celebration of Canada as the honoured country at the 2020 Frankfurt Book Fair, Canada FBM 2020, 3 people have been named to the literary programming committee: Heather Kanabe, French-Canadian Claudia Larochelle, and former artistic director of the Vancouver Writers Fest, Hal Wake. They will program more than 80 Canadian writers and illustrators to participate in activities at Frankfurt during the fair in October as well as across Germany, Austria, and Switzerland throughout 2020.
