= Claudia Rueda =

Colombian picture book author and illustrator

Claudia Rueda is a Colombian picture book author, The New York Times Best Seller illustrator and a 2016 Hans Christian Andersen award nominee.

Rueda studied Law and Art and completed an MFA in Creative Writing from Lesley University at Cambridge, Massachusetts.

Rueda’s books have been published throughout North America, Europe and Asia and have been translated into thirteen different languages. She is the author of Bunny Slopes, a New York Public Library and Junior Library Guild Selection. She is also the illustrator of Here Comes the Easter Bunny, a Kirkus Best Book of the Year and a Goodreads Choice Award winner.

In 2025, Rueda taught a course in Picture Book Writing at the School of Visual Arts in New York City. During the COVID-19 pandemic, she designed a workshop for Domestika on how to think, plan out and write a picture book.

With regard to the role of luck in her success, Rueda quotes Seneca “Luck is what happens when preparation meets opportunity.” She embellishes this by telling students to show up every day: "... sooner or later the train of luck will pass." She points out that one cannot control luck, but by being disciplined it can eventually show up.

== Published books ==
As writer and illustrator, Rueda's books include:

- I know an old lady who swallowed a fly (2004)
- Let's Play in the Forest (Scholastic, 2006)
- My Little Polar Bear (Scholastic, 2009)
- No (Groundwood, 2010)
- Huff & Puff (Abrams, 2012)
- Is it Big or is it Little? (Eerdmans Books for Young Readers, 2013)
- Bunny Slopes (Chronicle Books, 2016)
- Hungry Bunny (Chronicle Books, 2018)
- Bunny Overboard (Chronicle Books, 2020)

As illustrator:

- Here Comes Teacher Cat (Dial Penguin, 2017)
- Here Comes Valentine Cat (Dial Penguin, 2015)
- Here Comes the Tooth Fairy Cat (Dial Penguin, 2015)
- Here Comes The Easter Cat (Dial Penguin, 2014)
- Here Comes Santa Cat (Dial Penguin, 2014)
- Nacho and Lolita (Scholastic, 2005)
- The Painting (2019)

== Awards ==
- 2011 CCBC choice (Univ. Wisconsin),
- 2009 Oppenheim Platinum Award,
- 2007 National Parenting Publications Gold Award,
- 2006 CHILD Magazine Best Children's Books,
- Colombian IBBY Honor List
- Nati per Leggere Prize

== Biographical and critical sources ==
Periodicals

- Booklist, October 1, 2005, Jennifer Mattson
- Review of Nacho and Lolita, p. 66; November 15, 2006, Hazel Rochman
- Review of Let’s Play in the Forest While the Wolf Is Not Around, p. 51.
- Críticas, November 1, 2003, Ann Welton
- Review of Mientras se enfría el pastel; October 1, 2006, Veronica Covington
- Kirkus Reviews, October 1, 2005, review of Nacho and Lolita, p. 1088; October 1, 2006
- Review of Let’s Play in the Forest While the Wolf Is Not Around, p. 1023.
- Publishers Weekly, August 22, 2005, review of Nacho and Lolita, p. 63.
- School Library Journal, October 2005, Rosalyn Pierini, review of Nacho and Lolita, p. 144; October 2006, Linda *Zeilstra Sawyer, review of Let’s Play in the Forest While the Wolf Is Not Around, p. 1125.

== Interviews ==
Taller Espantapajaros.

Online

- Claudia Rueda Home Page, (October 17, 2007).
- Open Library.
- Biblioteca Luis Angel Arango
