= Claudia Cislek =

German singer (born 1990

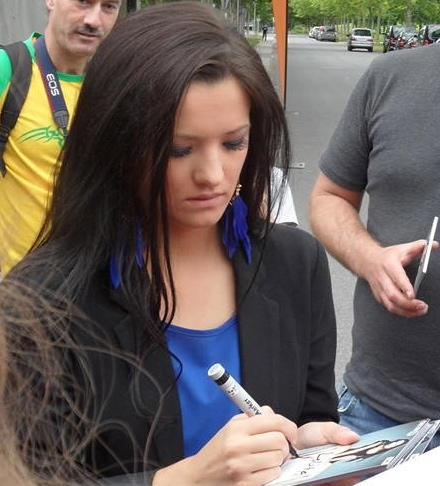
Lolita Jolie at ZDF (2011)

Claudia Cislek (born 1990), known as Lolita Jolie, is a German singer of Polish descent. She sings in French with a German accent.

Lolita Jolie is best known for the song "Joli Garçon" ("Cute Boy") which she first sang as just Lolita. The song peaked in January 2011 at #20 in the French single charts; and charted #28 in the German Top 50 ODC, compiled by Media Control, in 2011

Later she changed her stage name to Lolita Jolie, to avoid confusion with Austrian singer Edith Zuser, who also called herself Lolita.

In 2014, Lolita Jolie recorded a song with BaceFook, titled "Mon Chéri".

== Discography ==
- 2010: Joli Garçon
- 2011: La Première Fois
- 2012: The Non Non Non
- 2013: Moi Lolita
- 2013: I Wanna Dance With You
- 2014: Mon Chéri ft. BaceFook
- 2015: Bonjour Madame
