= Claudia Fleming =

American dessert chef

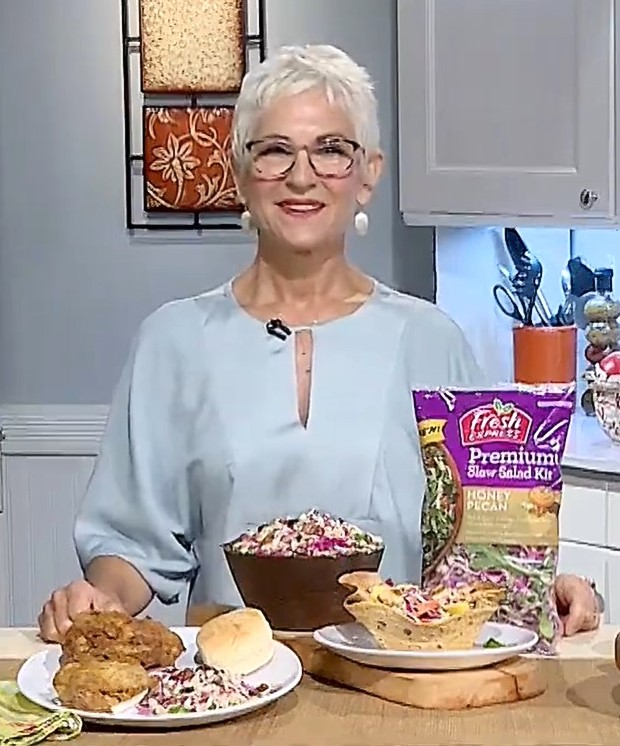
- Fleming in 2021
- Born: April 11, 1959 (age 66); Brentwood, New York, United States
- Occupations: Dessert chef; Writer
- Organizations: Union Square Cafe; Tribeca Grill
- Notable work: The Last Course
- Spouse: Gerry Hayden (m. 2005; died 2015)

Claudia Fleming (born 1958 or 1959) is an American dessert chef. She grew up in Long Island, New York, and initially pursued ballet. She instead became a professional dessert chef, releasing a book entitled The Last Course. The book attained a cult following, as well as critical praise. She has been featured on Beat Bobby Flay, Chopped, Barefoot Contessa, and Top Chef: Just Desserts.

== Early life ==
Claudia Fleming grew up in Long Island, New York, born in 1958/1959. Her childhood dream was to practice ballet. However, by the age of 18, she found herself neither tall nor thin enough to continue, and chafed under traditional ballet's strict regimen. She then moved to New York City, aiming to become a modern dancer by the age of 25. In the meantime, she supported herself by working in the restaurant industry.

== Career ==
One of the first jobs she took was as a waiter at Union Square Cafe. The restaurant's owner, Danny Meyer, later wrote in the preface of Fleming's book that he hired her before she even sat down for the interview, commenting that "even from half a room away, I could feel her warmth, poise, and intelligence". She went from waiting tables to line cooking, and then found a job as a pastry assistant at Tribeca Grill. Fleming comments that "once I tried a pastry, that was it for me ... I was hooked."

She received the James Beard Foundation’s Outstanding Pastry Chef for 2000.

Fleming released her first book, The Last Course, in 2001. The book sold poorly upon release, a showing largely attributed to its poor timing; The Last Course was released in the month following the September 11 attacks. However, the book was acclaimed among professionals; it began amassing a cult following, and Bon Appétit magazine called it "the greatest dessert cookbook in the history of the world". When the book went out of print, used copies began circulating on eBay for hundreds of dollars. The book was re-released in fall of 2019.

=== Style ===
Fleming's recipes are credited as being somewhat accessible. Newsday opines that her cookbook is "a great present for an ambitious baker", and that her recipes are time-consuming and involve many steps, if not necessarily difficult. The Atlanta Journal-Constitution noted that the recipes were organized around key ingredients, and complimented her Guinness Stout Ginger Cake as "fun to make, fun to eat, and, like the rest of the book, as stylish as it is timeless".

== Personal life ==
Fleming married Gerry Hayden, a professional chef and her former boss at Tribeca Grill, in 2001. They moved back to the North Fork of Long Island in 2005, and started a restaurant and hotel called the North Fork Table & Inn. They started a lunch truck on the property in 2011.
