= Claudia Brush Kidwell =

American historian

Claudia Brush Kidwell (born January 7, 1941) is a costume historian and former curator at the Smithsonian Institution at the National Museum of American History in the Division of Social History, primarily in the Costume Collection. She served as the first and only female acting director at the Museum of History and Technology in 1979.

== Education ==
Claudia Brush Kidwell received her bachelor's degree at University of Maryland in 1962 and her master's degree in 1964 from Pennsylvania State University in Home Economics and Clothing and Textiles.

== Professional career ==
Between her junior and senior year at the University of Maryland, Kidwell worked as an intern in the Division of Textiles at the Museum of History and Technology in 1961. After completing her undergraduate and graduate studies, Kidwell returned to the Smithsonian as assistant curator in the Section of Costume in 1964. She advanced to curator after three years, serving as liaison to her predecessor, Anne Wood Murray, where her primary research focused on 18th- and 19th-century women's clothing. Kidwell published her research on American women's bathing suits and costume in 1968 and continued her research on short gowns and the McDowell Garment Drafting Machine until plans for the Bicentennial of the American Revolution anniversary exhibition began in the early 1970s.

The inaugural exhibition for the bicentennial was curated by Kidwell in an exhibit called Suiting Everyone: The Democratization of Clothing in America. The exhibit opened in 1974 and received positive reviews in its thematic interpretation of clothing and fashion appearance's influence on cultural identity, a new strategy in the Section of Costume. Her research on this particular exhibit not only inspired visitors but her own initiative to research gender perspectives in costume and appearance, which would surface in her later exhibits and Smithsonian activities.

== Establishment of the Division of Costume ==
Kidwell initiated a proposal for the formal separation of the former Division of Costume and Furnishings in 1977. Kidwell proposed an independent Division of Costume in a memorandum addressed to then assistant director, Silvio Bedini:

"Clothes made the man," observed Mark Twain. "Naked people have little or no influence in society."

I use this quote to illustrate in a different way the obvious but frequently overlooked fact that clothing is fundamental to the human experience. Remember, the first thing that Adam and Eve did after eating an apple was to find fig leaves!

- Subject: Costume-to be a Division or not to be a Division? Memo to Silvio Bedini from Claudia Kidwell, March 31, 1977

The Division of Costume was formally established the following year in 1978 upon Kidwell's proposal. The successful proposal subsequently led to her promotion to curator and supervisor in the new Division of Costume from 1978 to 1981. She served as chairman to the Department of Cultural History from 1978 to 1981, after which she returned to her position as curator/supervisor in the Division of Costume until 1995. She would come to serve as the first and only female acting director of the Museum of History and Technology in the fall of 1979.

Kidwell went on to curate a number of exhibits, of which Getting Dressed: Fashionable Appearance, 1750–1800 (1985–1987), Men and Women: A History of Costume, Gender, and Power (1989–1991), and Looking American (1994 as a part of The Smithsonian's America) held particular attention in their successful redefinition of the American identity through clothing and appearance.

In 1995, Kidwell became curator of the Division of Social History in the Costume Collection.

== Other professional work ==
Kidwell's initial research primarily focused on 18th- and 19th-century women's clothing, influencing her innovative research on short gowns. Her trajectory changed course as her research turned towards the changing gender conventions in and throughout fashion history. Her primary work aimed to study the importance of fashionable appearance for the identification of social group, changing fashions and philosophies, and the relationship between prescribed posture and gestures and the layers of clothing as they were put on. Kidwell's main priority in her research was to "talk about behavior" as opposed to solely clothes, denoting an emphasis on the influence of fashion on not only gender roles but consequently identity and culture.

In 1990, Kidwell created an initiative, catalyzed by her own interest in gender perspectives, called the Gender Issues Action Group (GIAG). This organization originated within the Smithsonian Institution and has since moved on to work with other Smithsonian organizations to formally integrate ethnicities and identities formerly underrepresented at the Smithsonian Institution.

Kidwell formally changed the Division of Costume's mission statement in 1991 to shift the collecting focus from that of assembling complete collections of objects to that of collecting material to provide insights into what it had meant to be an American. This influenced a major change in the questions asked about what is included in a collection of costume.

Kidwell's legacy on material culture's influence and significance as well as her determination to change conservative views of identity at the Smithsonian has proven pivotal in the Smithsonian Institution's reimagining of history and museum culture.

== Publications ==
- "Conformity and Deindividuation: Studies in Conflict and Restraint". Research Bulletin. 44. Pennsylvania State University Department of Psychology. 1964.
- "Women's Bathing and Swimming Costume in the United States" (PDF). U.S. National Museum Bulletin. 250. Washington, D.C.: Smithsonian Institution Press. 1968.
- Suiting Everyone: The Democratization of Clothing in America. With Margaret C. Christman. Washington, D.C.: Smithsonian Institution Press. 1974.
- "Paper Patterns". 1876: A Centennial Exhibition. Washington, D.C.: Smithsonian Institution Press. 1976.
- "Rags, Riches, and In-Between". Historic Preservation. 28: 73–87. 1976.
- Kidwell, Claudia (1977-01-01). "Apparel for Ballooning with speculations on more commonplace garb". Costume. 11 (1): 73–87. doi:10.1179/cos.1977.11.1.73. ISSN 0590-8876.
- Kidwell, Claudia (1978). "Short Gowns". Dress. 4 (1): 30–65. doi:10.1179/036121178805298838. ISSN 0361-2112.
- Kidwell, Claudia B. (1979). "Cutting a Fashionable Fit: Dressmakers' Drafting Systems in the United States". Smithsonian Studies in History and Technology (42): 163. doi:10.5479/si.00810258.42.1. hdl:10088/2441.
- Getting Dressed: Fashionable Appearance, 1750–1800. Division of Costume, NMAH. 1985.
- Steele, Valerie, ed. (1989). Men and Women: Dressing the Part. With Valerie Steele. Washington, D.C.: Smithsonian Institution Press.
