= Claudia Petracchi =

Italian softball player (born 1966)

Claudia Petracchi (born 9 March 1966) is an Italian softball player who competed in the 2000 Summer Olympics.

Claudia Petracchi atleta

museo del baseball Claudia Petracchi

olympedia athlete

Benemerenze Sportive

Claudia Petracchi e la nostalgia del campo

Il softball alle Olimpiadi

Nuoto Master, italiani padroni dei 400 stile libero di Kranj!

CLAUDIA PETRACCHI

Dizionario-dei-colori Zanichelli
