= Claudia Natasia =

Indonesian novelist

Claudia Natasia is an Indonesian author and philanthropist. At age 16, she published her first realistic fiction novel, Just Like Butterflies, which details the experience of an adopted girl suffering from post traumatic disorder. The book was published in 2010 and reprinted in 2014. It was one of the titles selected to represent Indonesia at the World Book Fair.

All proceeds from Just Like Butterflies were used to improve the education condition of children in the city of Ambon. Aside from her interest in improving the educational welfare of Indonesian children, Natasia is also concerned with poverty alleviation. She has written extensively about this issue and has worked on efforts to help raise awareness for the cause.

== Personal life ==
Natasia is the oldest daughter from a family of entrepreneurs in Jakarta, Indonesia. She was educated at Sekolah Pelita Harapan. She received her Bachelors and MBA degrees from the University of California, Berkeley and is now residing in San Francisco, California, where she continues to work as a product leader in tech startups.
