= Alessandro Rinaldi =

Alessandro Rinaldi might refer to:

- Alessandro Rinaldi (painter) (born 1839), Cremonese historic painter
- Alessandro Rinaldi (footballer) (born 1974), Italian footballer

== See also ==
- Rinaldi, surname
