= Vincenzo Guarana =

Italian painter

Vincenzo Guarana (July 22, 1742 –1815) was an Italian painter, active mainly in Venice and its mainland territories.

== Biography ==
He was born in Venice, and he trained under his father the painter Jacopo Guarana (1720-1808) who had studied under Sebastiano Ricci and later Giovanni Battista Tiepolo. Vincenzo joined the guild of painters in 1761, and in 1774 he was elected to the recently founded Venetian Academy of Fine Arts, after winning a prize along with Giuseppe Gobbis. He was president of the Academy in 1799 and 1802. Vincenzo collaborated circa 1780 with his father in the canvases decorating the Palazzo Barbarigo della Terrazza. He also painted a John the Evangelist for the piers of San Pantalon and the ceiling of the church of San Tomà depicting the martyrdom of the Saint and other scenes from his life. He also painted altarpieces for the church of San Giuliano and for the parish church of Selva del Montello, and the archbishop's church at Colle Umberto. He completed also portraits and frescoes in the mainland.
