= Rinaldi =

Rinaldi is a surname. Notable people with the surname include:

- Alessandro Rinaldi (footballer) (born 1974), Italian soccer player
- Alessandro Rinaldi (painter) (1839–1890), Cremonese historic painter
- Andrea Rinaldi (2000–2020), Italian footballer
- Angelo Rinaldi (1940–2025), French writer and literary critic
- Ann Rinaldi (1934–2021), American young adult fiction author
- Antonella Rinaldi (born 1954), Italian actress and voice actress
- Antonio Rinaldi (architect) (с. 1710–1794), Italian architect
- Antonio Maria Rinaldi (born 1955), Italian economist and politician
- Bianca Rinaldi (born 1974), Brazilian actress
- Carlos Rinaldi (1915–1995), Argentine film director and screenwriter
- Cesare Rinaldi (1559–1636), Italian poet
- Claudio Rinaldi (painter) (1852–after 1909), Italian painter
- Claudio Rinaldi (speed skater) (born 1987), Italian short-track speed-skater
- Daniel Gómez Rinaldi (born 1965), Argentine journalist
- Danilo Rinaldi (born 1986), Argentine footballer
- Deborah Salvatori Rinaldi (born 1991), Italian footballer
- Domenico Rinaldi (born 1959), Italian diver
- Douglas Rinaldi (born 1979), Brazilian footballer
- Enrica Rinaldi (born 1998), Italian freestyle wrestler
- Filippo Rinaldi (footballer) (born 2002), Italian footballer
- François Rinaldi (1924–2002), French rugby player
- Gabriel Rinaldi (born 1970), Argentine football player and manager
- Giovanni Rinaldi Montorio (fl. 1538–1546), Catholic bishop
- Jessica Rinaldi, photojournalist
- Jordan Rinaldi (born 1987), American mixed martial artist
- Jorge Rinaldi (born 1963), Argentine footballer
- Julien Rinaldi (born 1979), French rugby player
- Juno Rinaldi (born 1977), Canadian actress
- Kathy Rinaldi (born 1967), American tennis player
- Lautaro Rinaldi (born 1993), Argentine footballer
- Lou Rinaldi (disambiguation), several people
- Luigi Rinaldi (1938–2023), Italian trade unionist and politician
- Margherita Rinaldi (1935–2023), Italian soprano
- Matt Rinaldi (born 1975), American lawyer and politician from Texas
- Michael Ruben Rinaldi (born 1995), Italian motorcycle racer
- Michele Rinaldi (footballer, born 1987), Italian football player
- Nicholas Rinaldi (1934–2020), American poet and novelist
- Nicolás Rinaldi (born 1993), Argentine footballer
- Odorico Raynaldi (1595–1671), Italian Catholic historian
- Redo Rinaldi (born 1994), Indonesian footballer
- Rich Rinaldi (born 1949), American basketball player
- Rudy Rinaldi (born 1993), Monegasque bobsledder
- Salvatore Giovanni Rinaldi (born 1937), Italian Catholic bishop
- Susana Rinaldi (born 1935), Argentine tango singer
- Tom Rinaldi, American sports commentator

== See also ==
- Rinaldo (disambiguation)
