= Lodovico Gallina =

Italian painter (1752–1787)

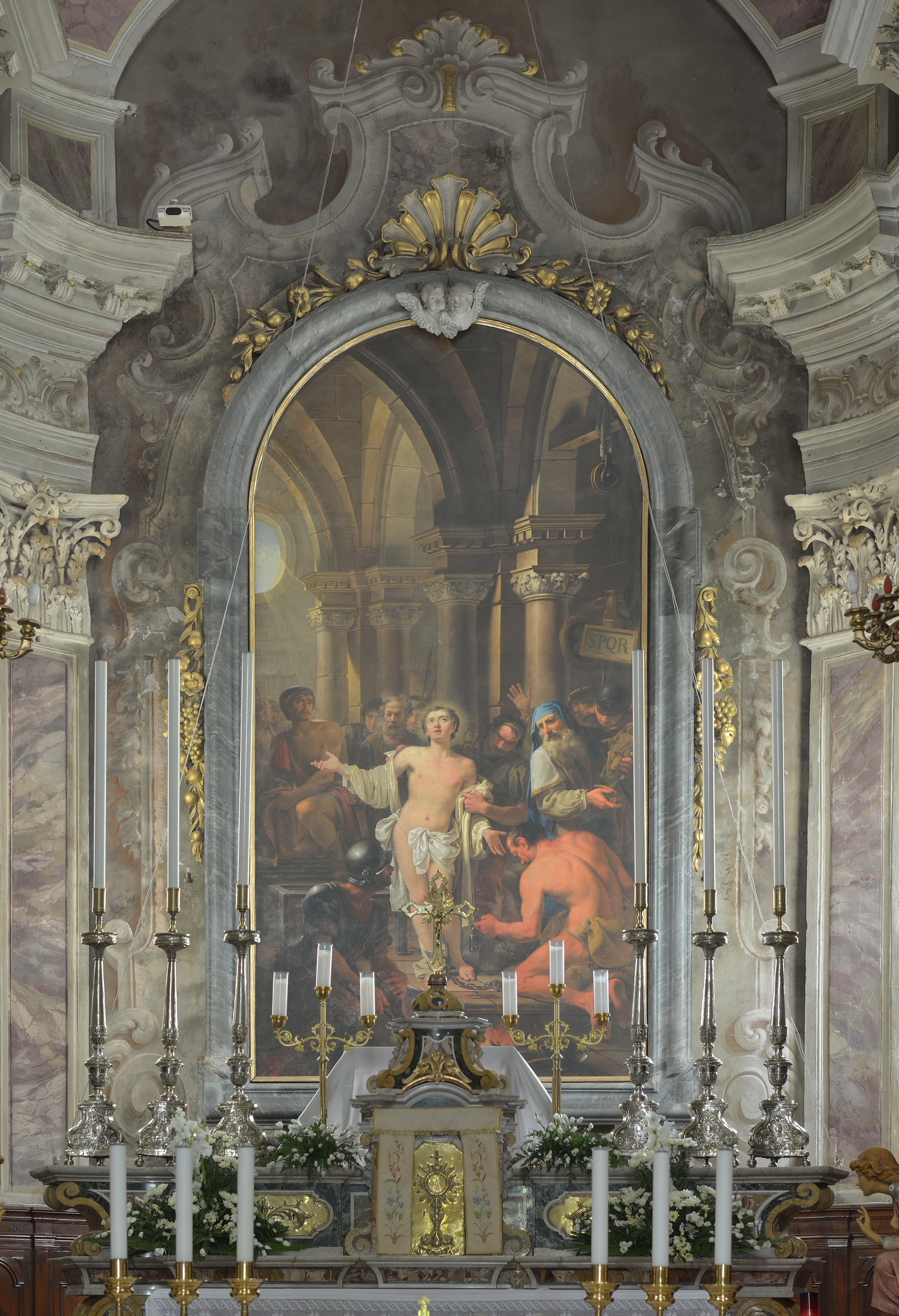
Rentable in the Saint Lawrence church in Carzago Riviera

Lodovico Gallina (25 August 1752 – 4 January 1787) was an Italian painter of the Baroque period, mainly active in Brescia. Born to poor parents in Brescia, he was initially a pupil of Antonio Dusi. Under the patronage of Luigi Chizzola and Faustino Lechi, he was sent to be instructed in the Accademia di Belle Arti in Venice.

He painted an altarpiece depicting Saints Ignatius of Loyola and Fillippo Neri for the church of Acquafredda. He painted a Young Jesus disputes doctors at the temple for the church in Bedizzole. A painter by the name Gallo Gallina (1796-1874) was active in Lombardy in the 19th century, but it is unclear if they are related.

Pastellist Anna Pasetti was active as a copyist in Gallina's studio.
