= Anna Pasetti =

Italian artist

Anna Pasetti was an Italian pastellist active between 1800 and 1806.

Pasetti, a deafmute, lived in Venice and assisted Lodovico Gallina, Jacopo Guarana, and Pietro Tantin as a copyist of both paintings and engravings. Giovanni Antonio Moschini singled her out among Venetian women pastellists. Two pieces, both copies after prints by John Raphael Smith, are in the collection of the Ca' Rezzonico.
