= Palazzo Contarini Pisani =

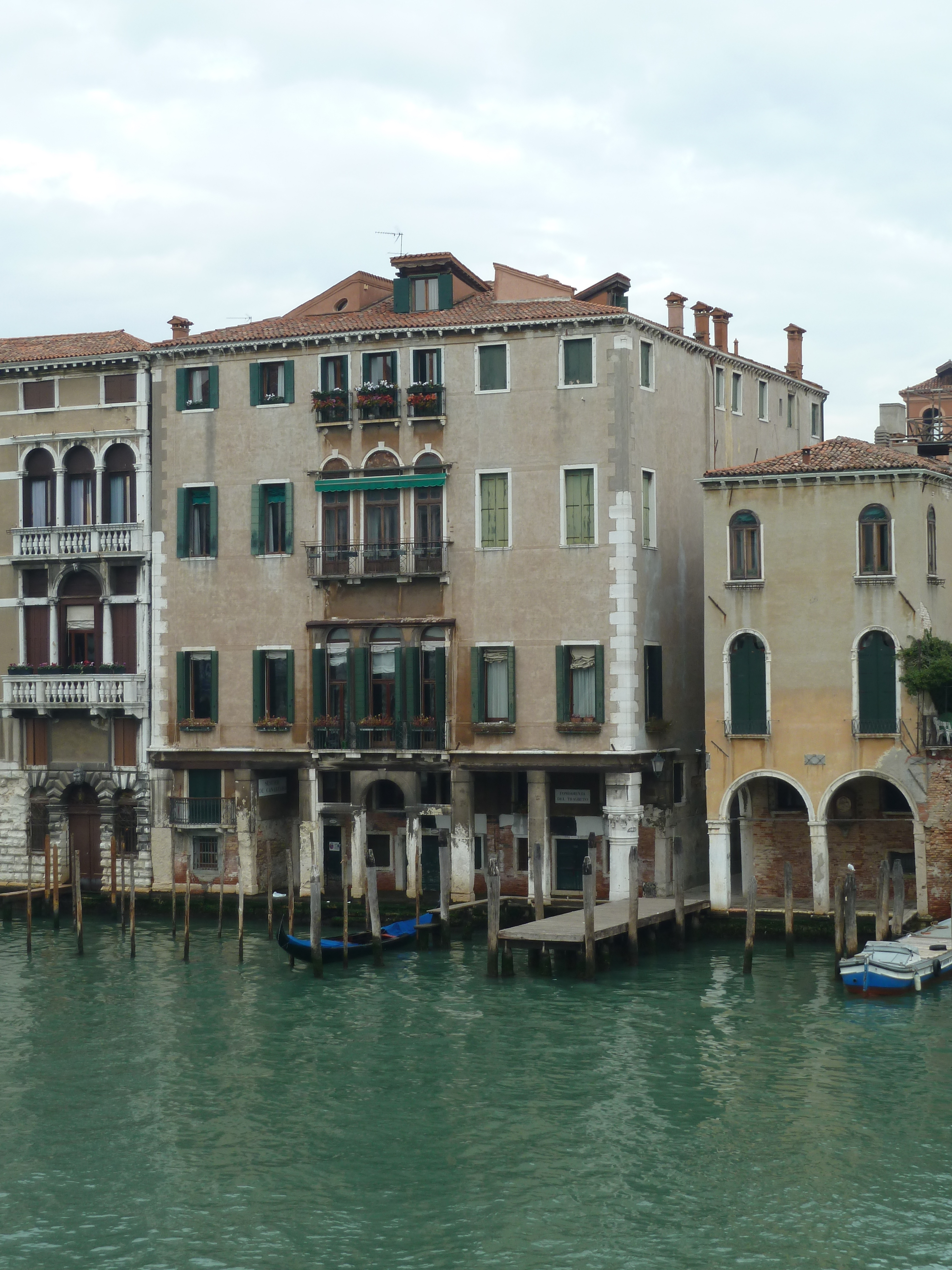
- Palazzo Contarini Pisani
- Interactive map of the Palazzo Contarini Pisani area

General information
- Type: Office
- Architectural style: Venetian Renaissance
- Location: Cannaregio district, Venice, Italy
- Coordinates: 45°26′29.13″N 12°19′58.13″E
- Construction started: 16th century

Technical details
- Floor count: 4 levels

Palazzo Contarini Pisani is a palace in Venice, located in the Cannaregio district, overlooking the left side of the Grand Canal, between Palazzo Boldù and Casa Levi Morenos, in front of Ca' Corner della Regina.

== History ==
Dating back to the 16th century and rebuilt from Veneto-Byzantine structure, the palace belonged to the Contarini family, who wanted to combine it with an adjacent building, but this plan was never realized. This is partly why the palazzo looks prosaic and outwardly unremarkable.

== Architecture ==
The four-story building has a semicircular arched portal with access to the water, framed by two rectangular and two square window openings, and rustication in the corners. The first floor is separated from the upper ones by a massive cornice, which turns the floor into a kind of loggia. The triforas in the middle of the facade emphasize the central axis of the whole composition. All openings are framed with Istrian stone; corner stones on both sides of the facade are also made of this material up to the middle of the second floor. On the right side, the first floor ends with a lonely, strange in proportion, but typically Venetian column with a fancy capital.

== Gallery ==
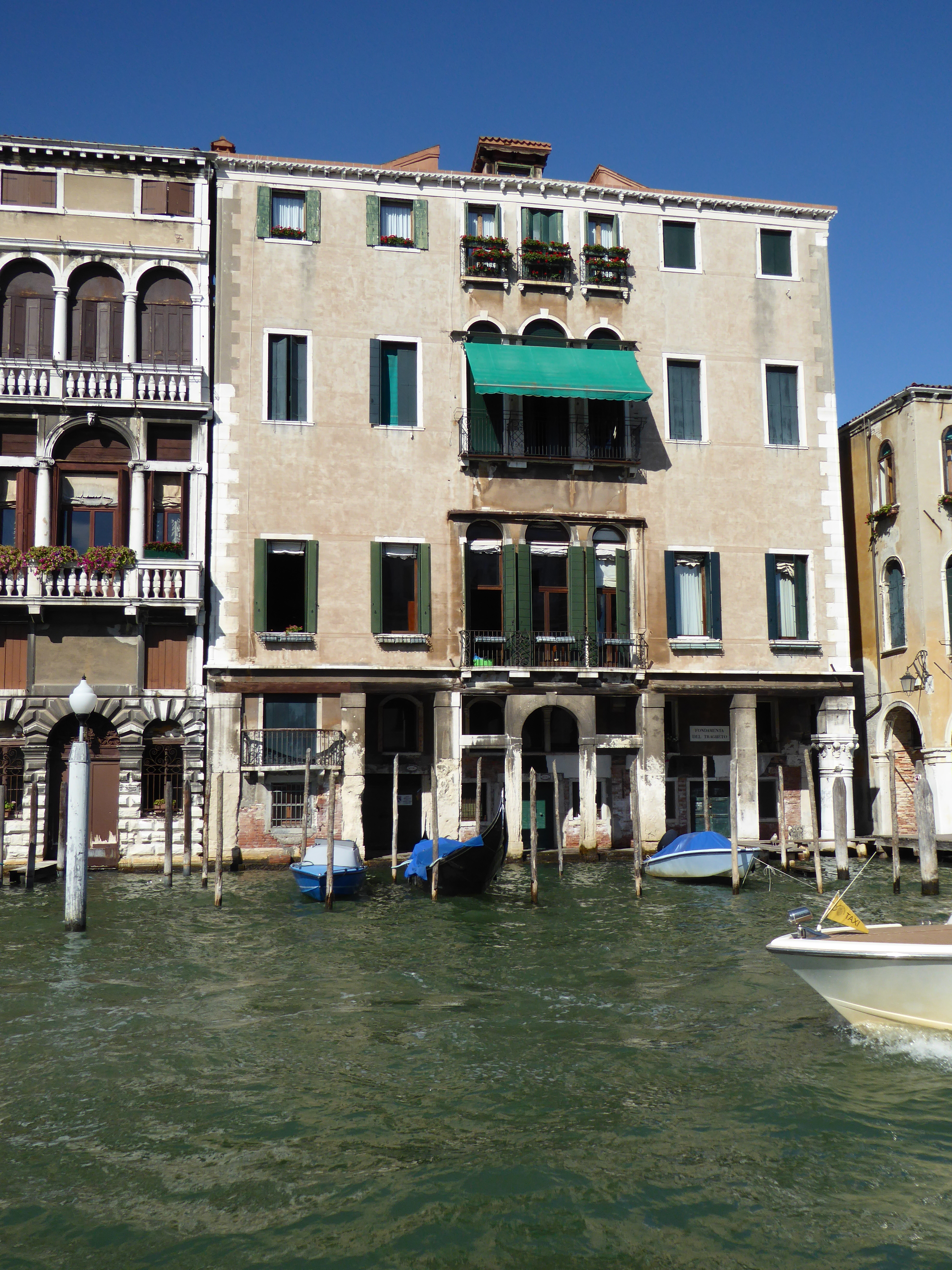
A view from Grand Canal

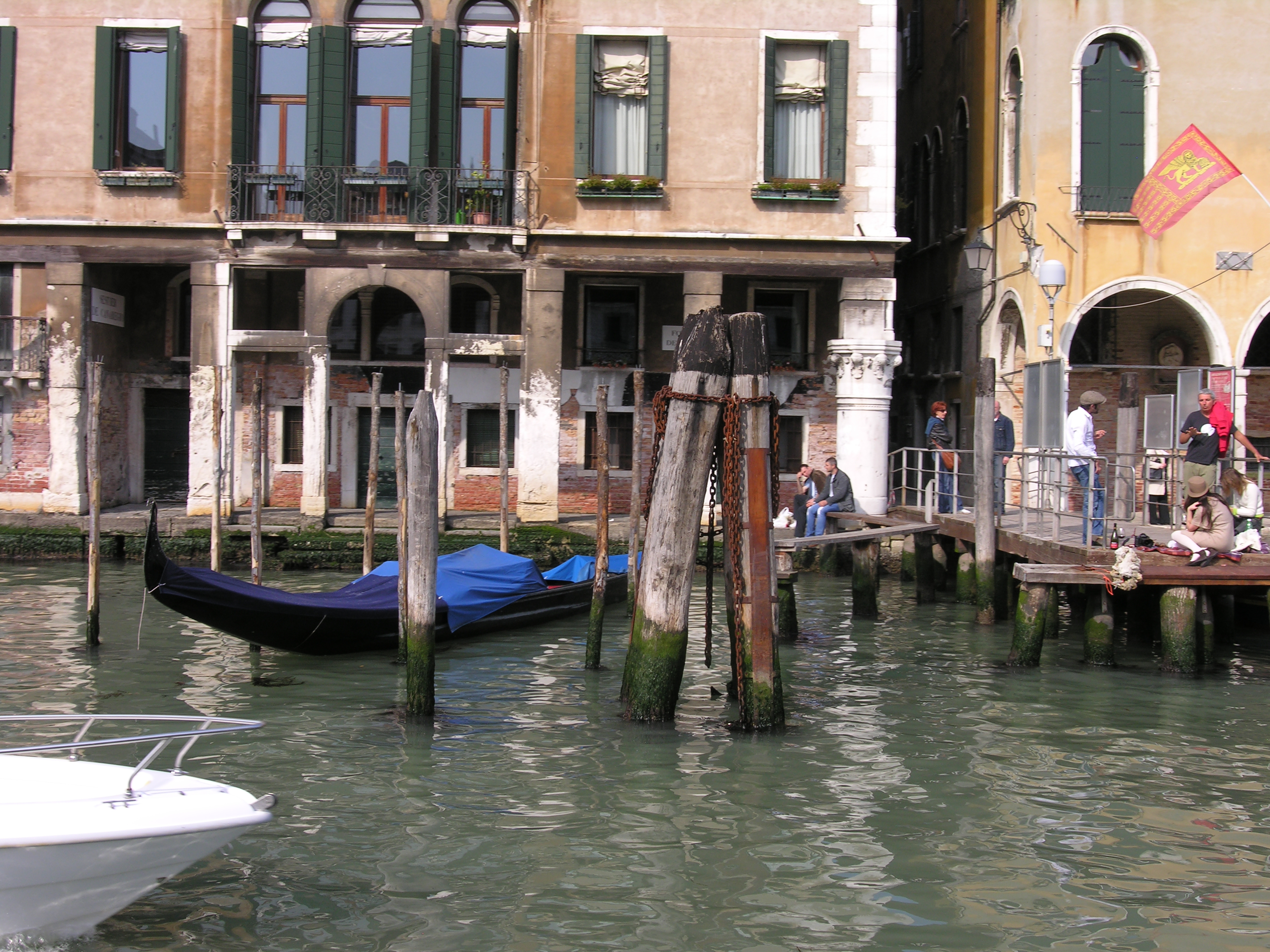
Facade details

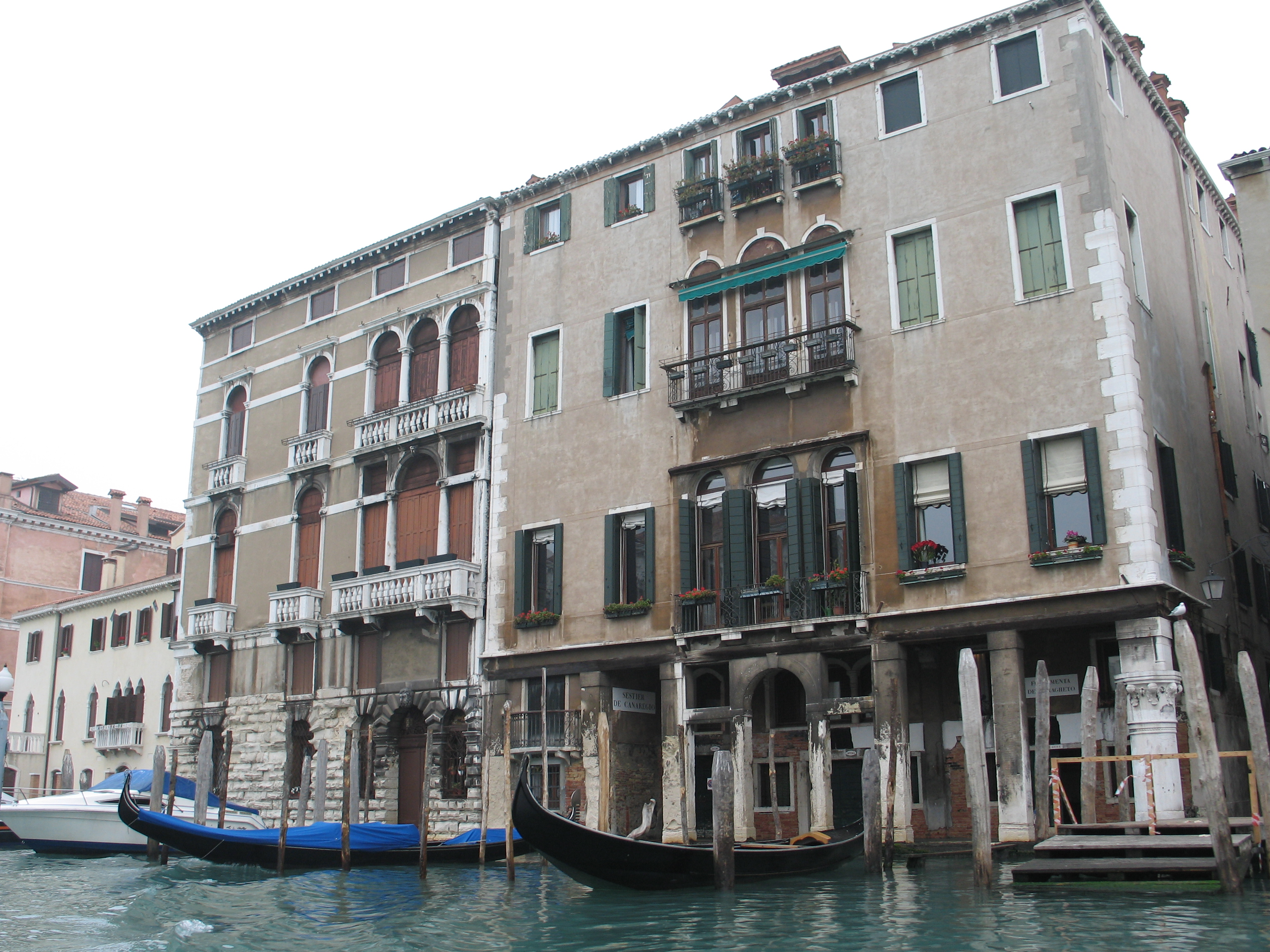
The right corner of the palazzo

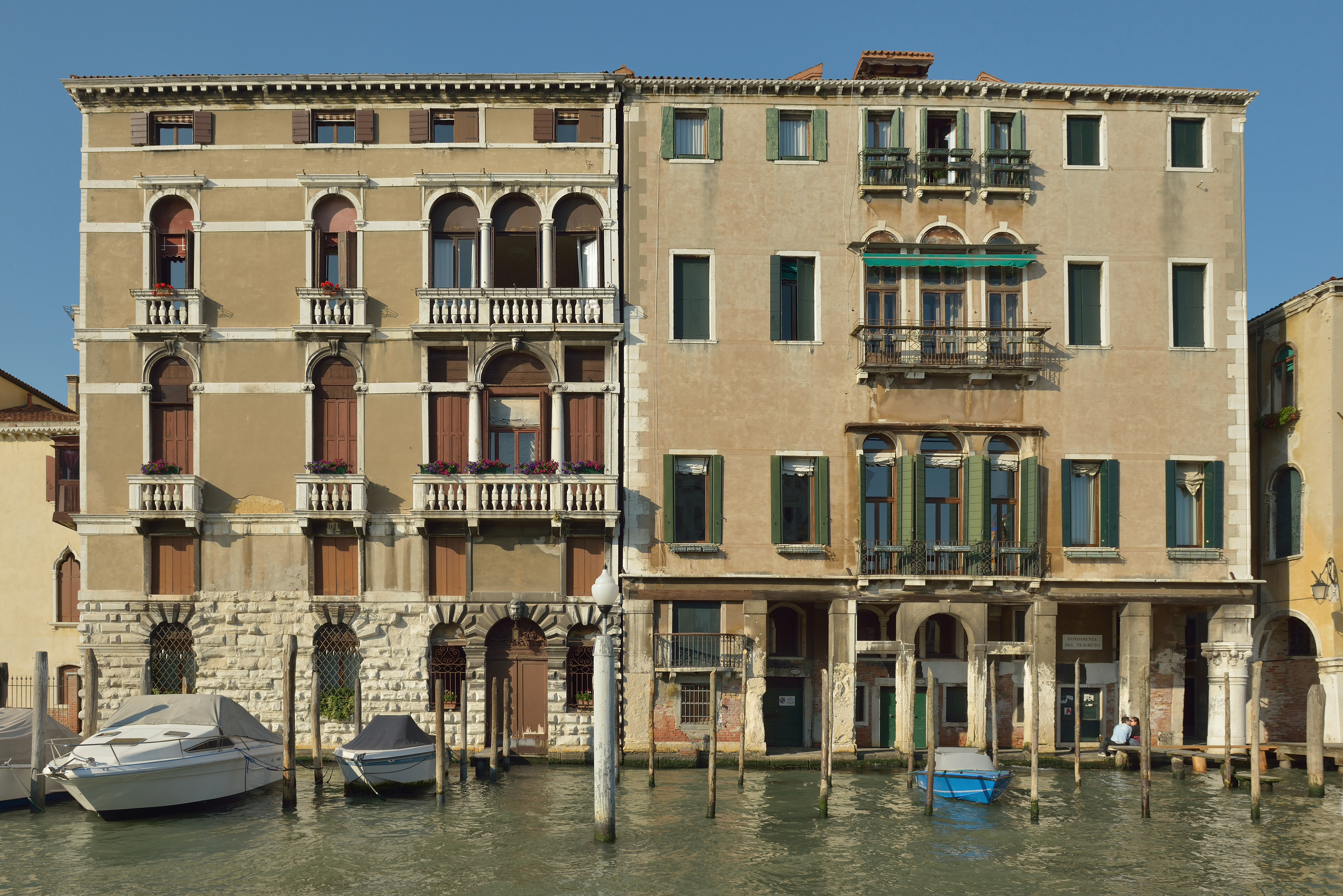
Palazzo Boldù a San Felice and Palazzo Contarini Pisani

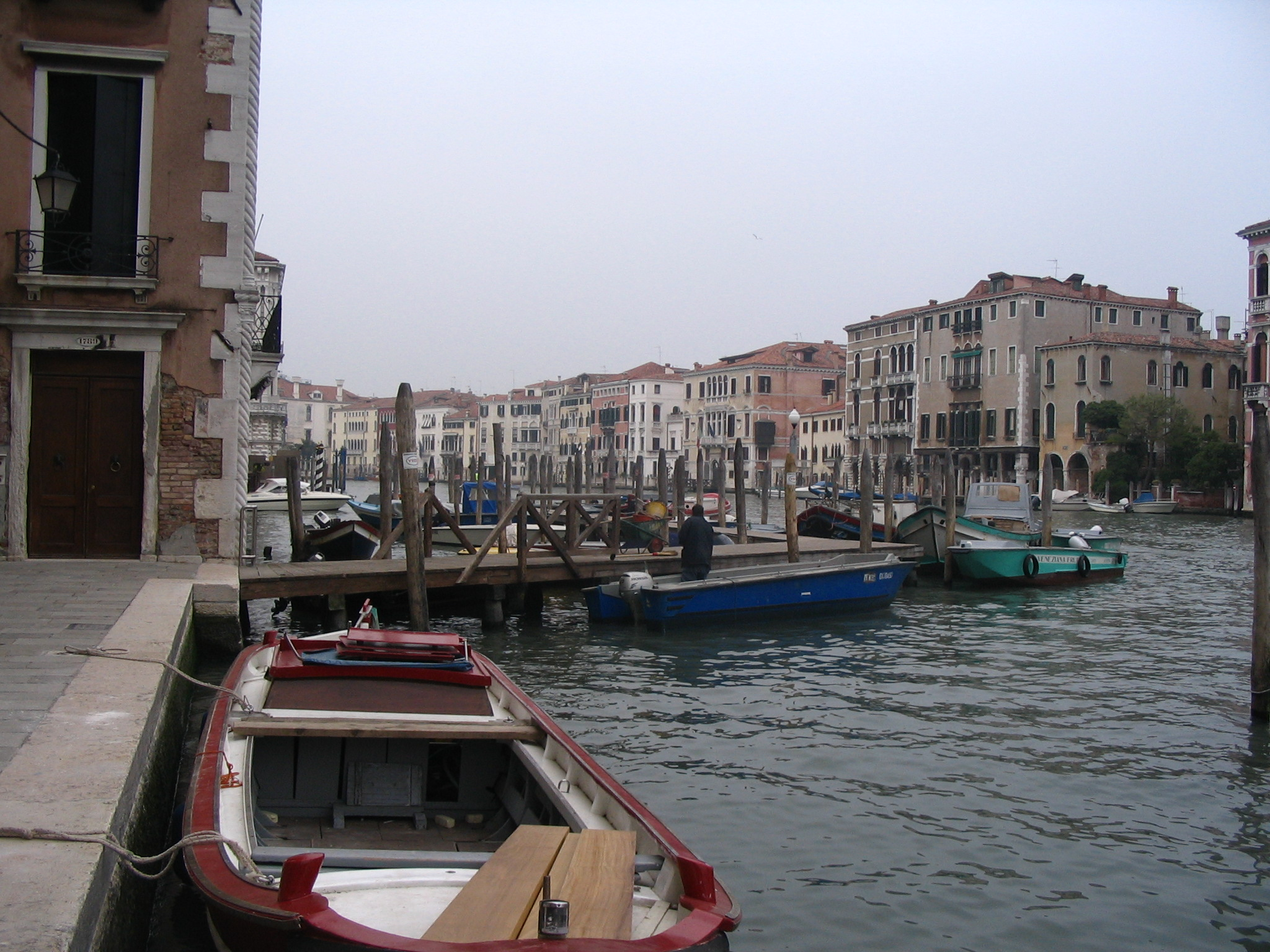
A view from the opposite side of Grand Canal
