= Palazzetto da Lezze =

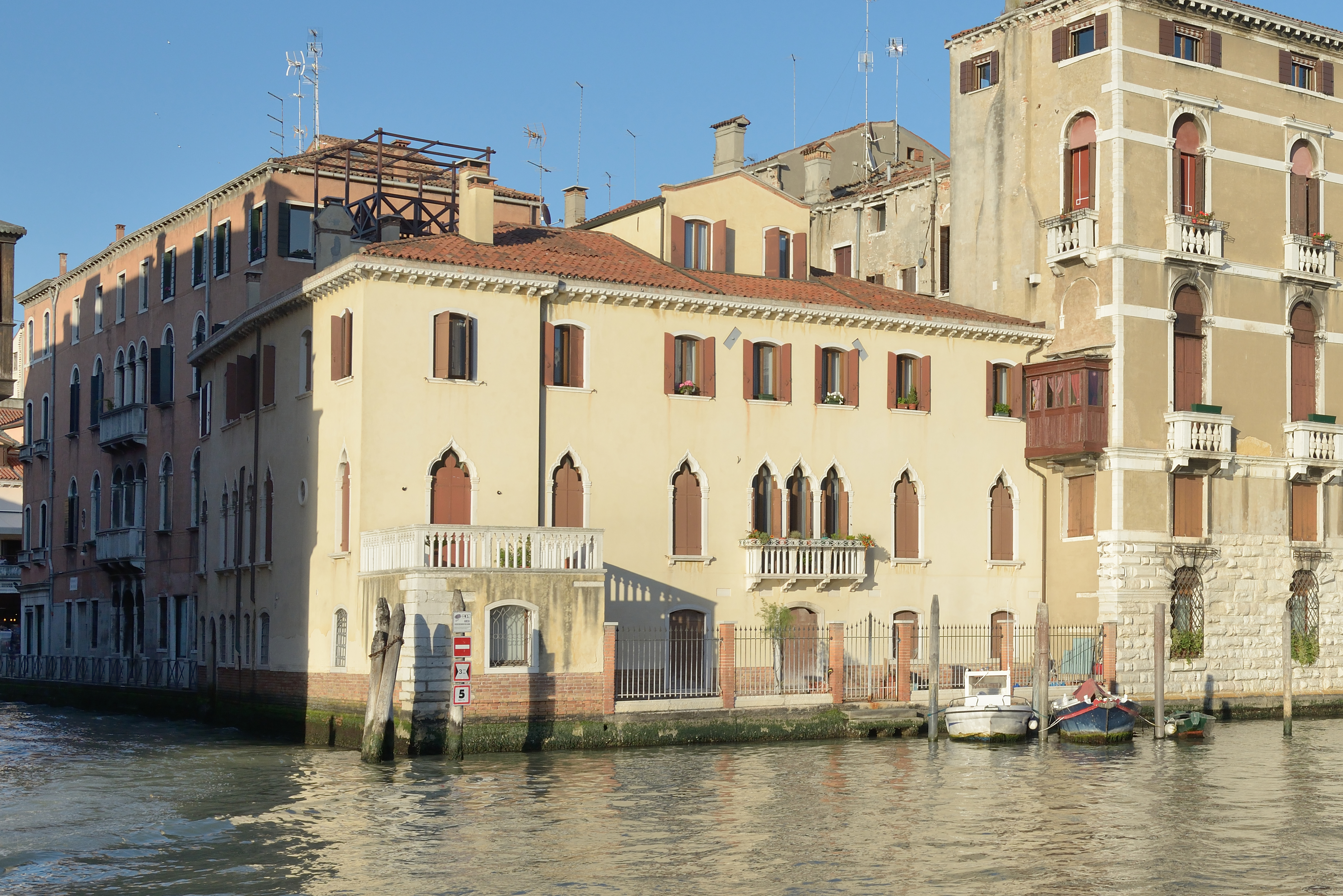
- Palazzetto da Lezze on the Rio di Noale canal and the Canal Grande
- Interactive map of the Palazzetto da Lezze area

General information
- Type: Residential
- Architectural style: Gothic
- Location: Cannaregio district, Venice, Italy
- Coordinates: 45°26′30″N 12°19′57″E
- Construction stopped: first part of 15th century

Technical details
- Floor count: 3

Design and construction
- Architect: Baldassare Longhena

Palazzetto da Lezze is a small Gothic palace located in Venice, Italy, in the Cannaregio district and overlooking the Grand Canal at the mouth of the Rio di Noale. The palazzetto is situated between the Palazzo Boldù a San Felice and the Casa Gussoni Grimani della Vida, opposite the Ca' Pesaro.

== History ==
The palace dates back to the first part of the 15th century and features Gothic style elements. The architect was Baldassare Longhena.

== Architecture ==
The palazzetto is lower than all the neighboring buildings. The structure has three full levels with no mezzanine. The main part of the facade is shifted to the right and is symmetrical in design. The noble floor features a trifora supported by a small balcony in the center, flanked by two and three single trefoil windows. The ground and top floors have arched window openings and follow the pattern of the noble floor. Above the dentilled eaves is a large dormer with two windows and a gable. On the left part of the ground floor, there is a porch with a balcony above.

The side facade faces the Rio di Noale and features a quadrifora on the main floor, shifted from the center to the left and flanked by a single window on each floor. The window layout on the ground and top floors is almost identical to that on the main floor.
