= Palazzo Michiel del Brusà =

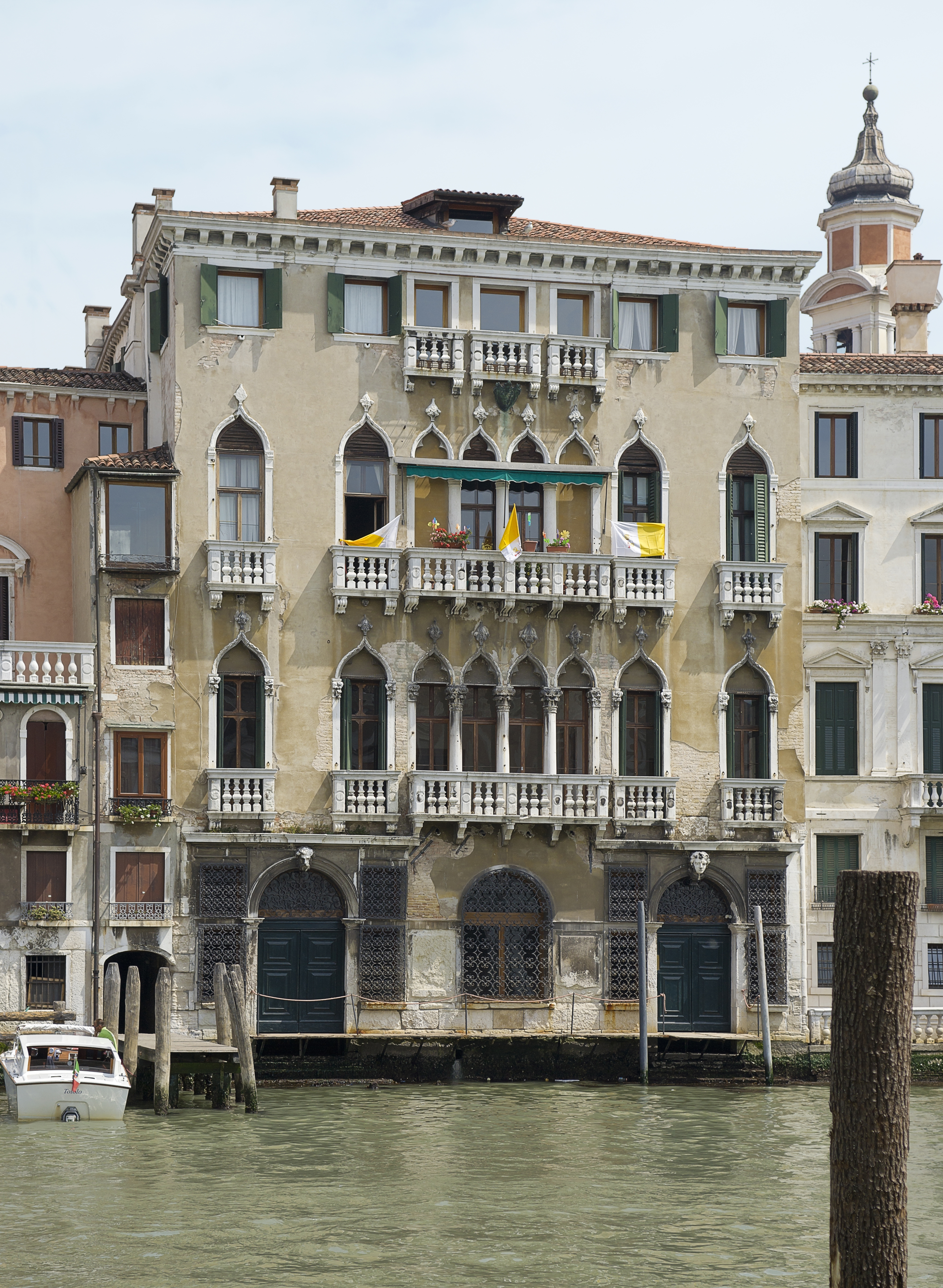
- Palazzo Michiel del Brusà
- Interactive map of the Palazzo Michiel del Brusà area

General information
- Type: Office
- Architectural style: Gothic
- Location: Cannaregio district, Venice, Italy
- Coordinates: 45°26′24.7″N 12°20′07.9″E
- Renovated: 1777
- Owner: Global Art Affairs Foundation

Technical details
- Floor count: 3

Palazzo Michiel del Brusà is a palace located in Venice, more precisely in the Cannaregio district, and overlooking the Grand Canal. The building is located between Palazzo Michiel dalle Colonne and Palazzo Smith Mangilli Valmarana.

== History ==
The palazzo was owned by the ancient and noble Michiel family. The family gave three doges to the republic, two of them, Domenico Michiel (1117–1130) and Vitale II Michiel (1156–1172), were forced to abdicate. The word brusà means "burned" in Venetian dialect, because in 1774, the palace was completely devastated by a fire due to the neglect of a maid. Only the original facade on the Grand Canal survived. Three years later, in 1777, the palazzo was rebuilt thanks to funding provided by the city. To commemorate the event, there is the Latin inscription on the facade: "Quos ignis consumpsit patria mementa majorum nepotibus patrios lares restituit s.e. vidus ianuarij 1777."

Today, Palazzo Michiel del Brusà is owned by the Global Art Affairs Foundation, a Dutch non-profit organization involved in the contemporary art and architecture.

== Architecture ==
The main façade is characterized by tripartition and symmetry, which is typical for a Venetian palace. The structure has two noble floors. Important elements of the facade are the two water portals on the ground floor and the quadriforas on the noble floors decorated by the traditional three-lobe Gothic flowers on the point of each arch. The quadriforas are flanked by pairs of single lancet windows on each side. The facade terminates with an attic mezzanine. All openings on the noble floors have projecting balconies and the typical gothic flower on the cusp of the arch. The interiors still preserve rich rooms decorated with stucco and frescos, mostly made by Jacopo Guarana.

== Gallery ==
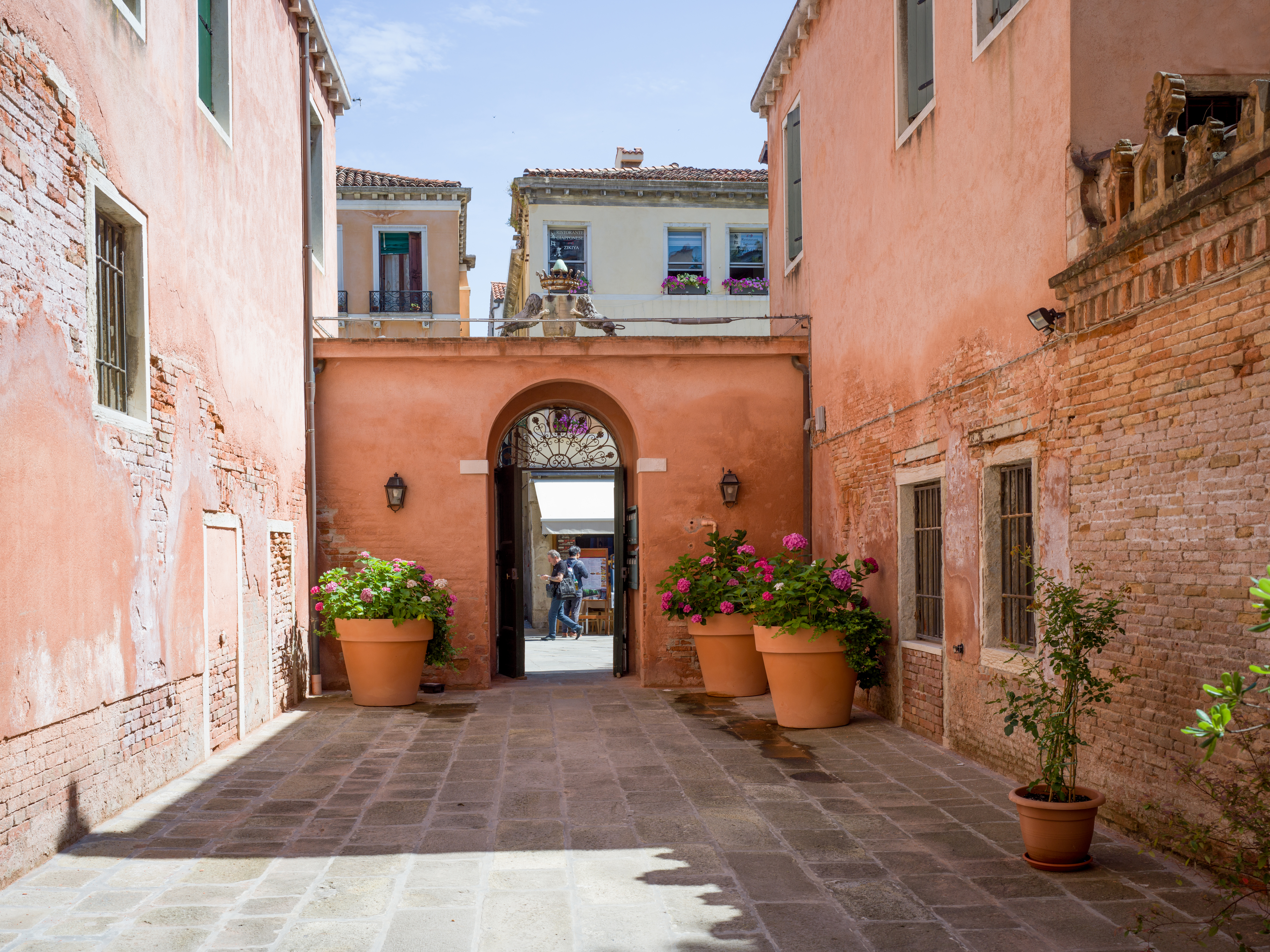
Internal courtyard

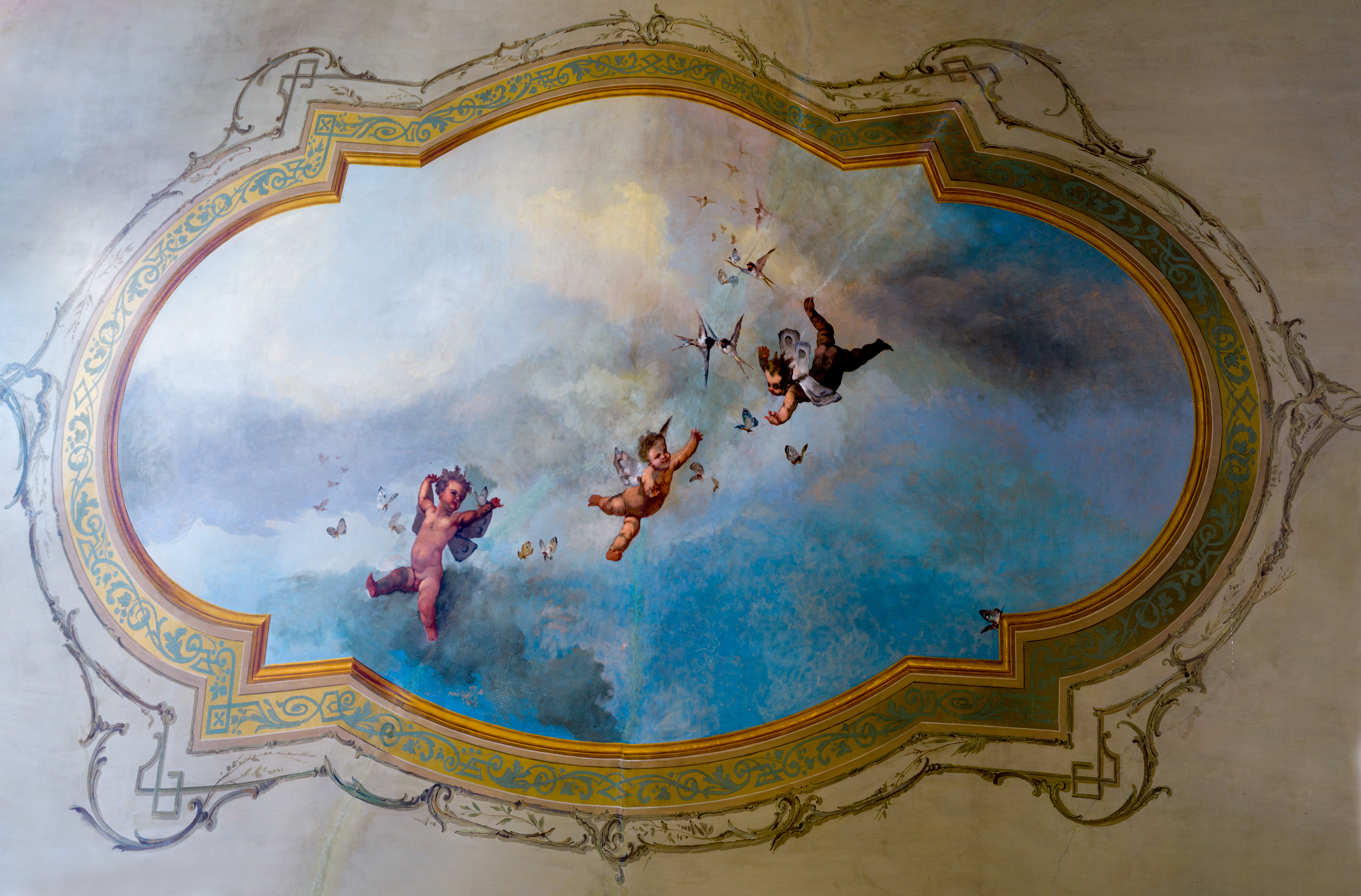
Fresco with putti in the palazzo

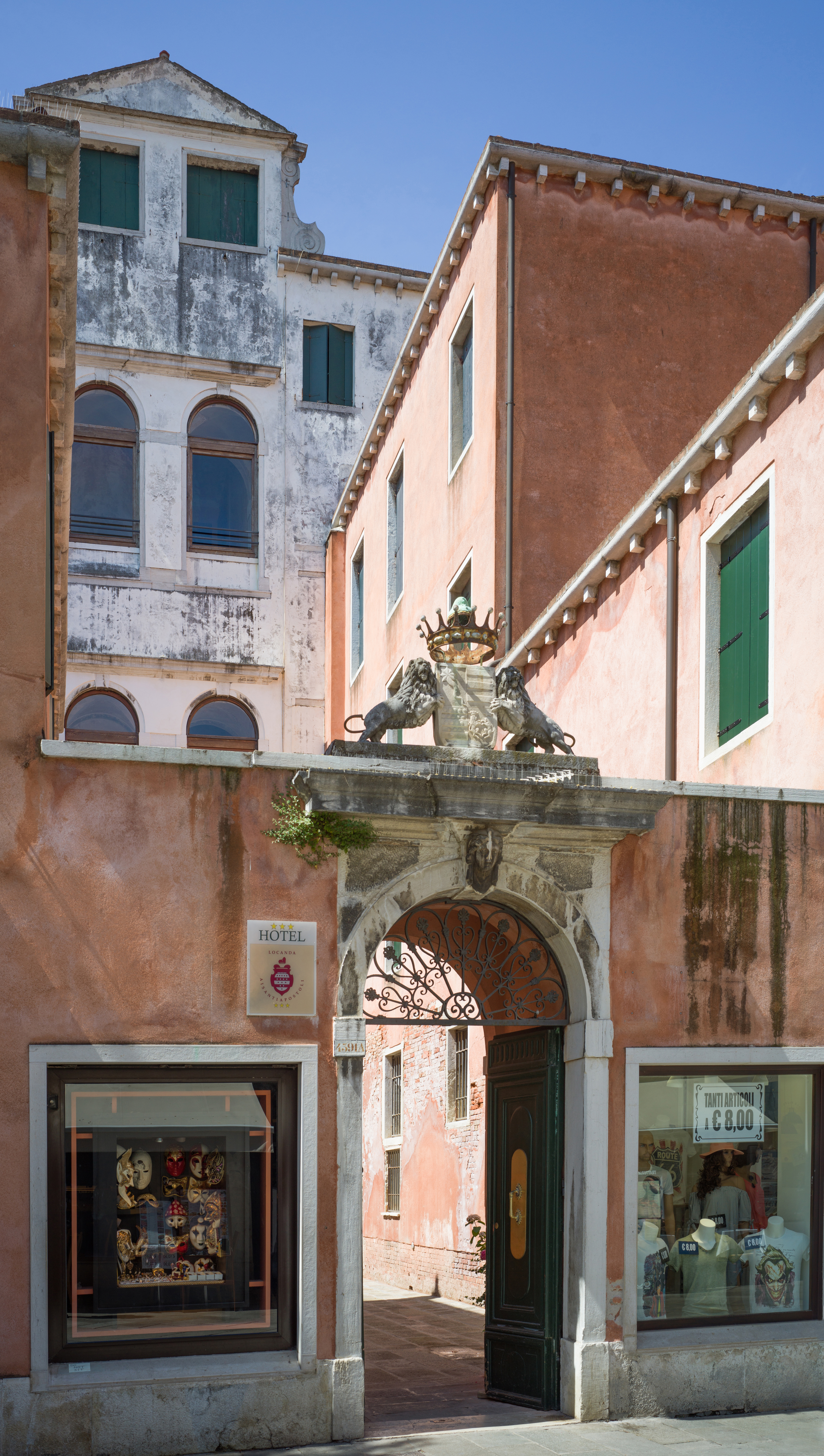
Entrance

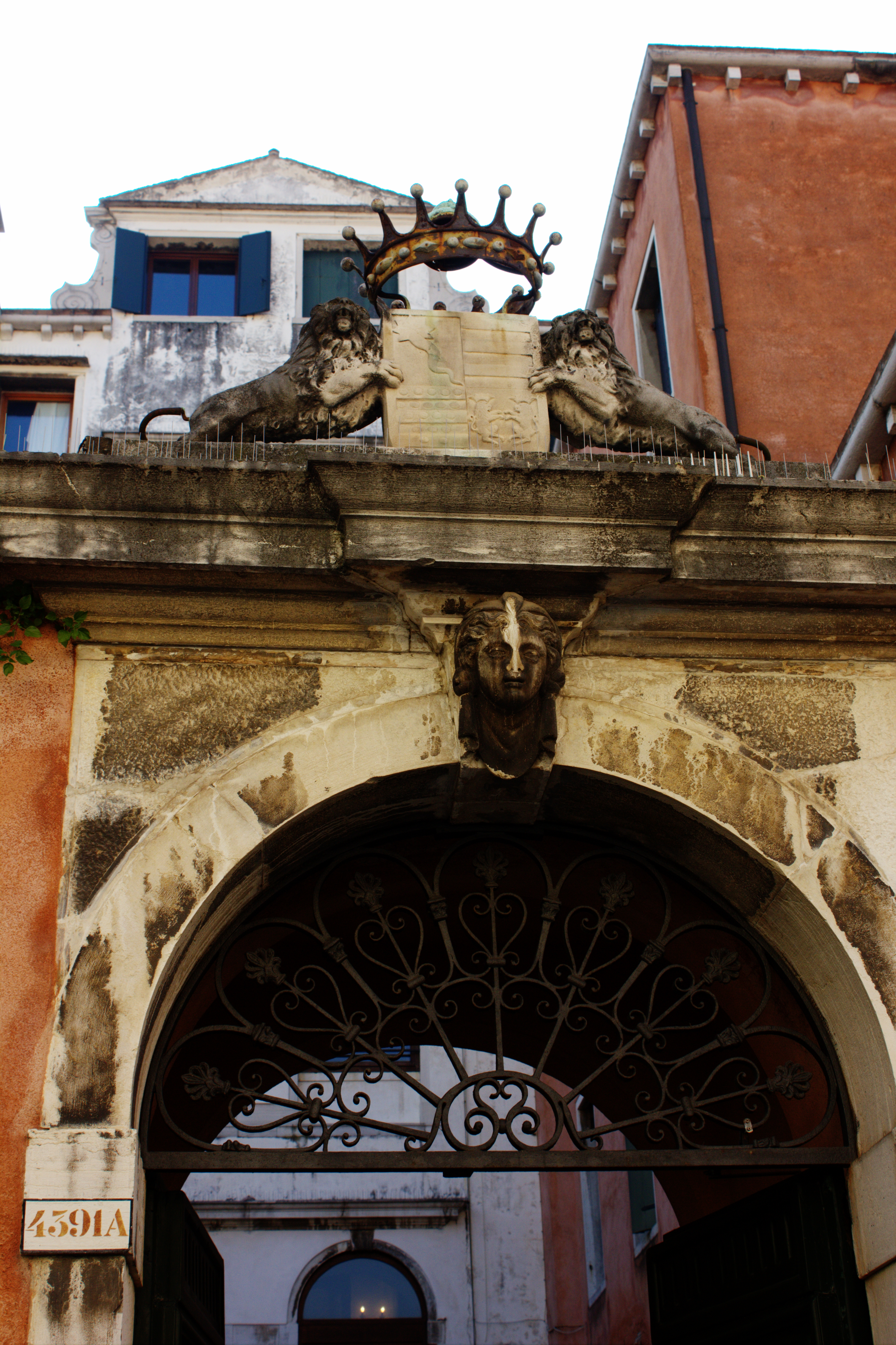
Entrance details

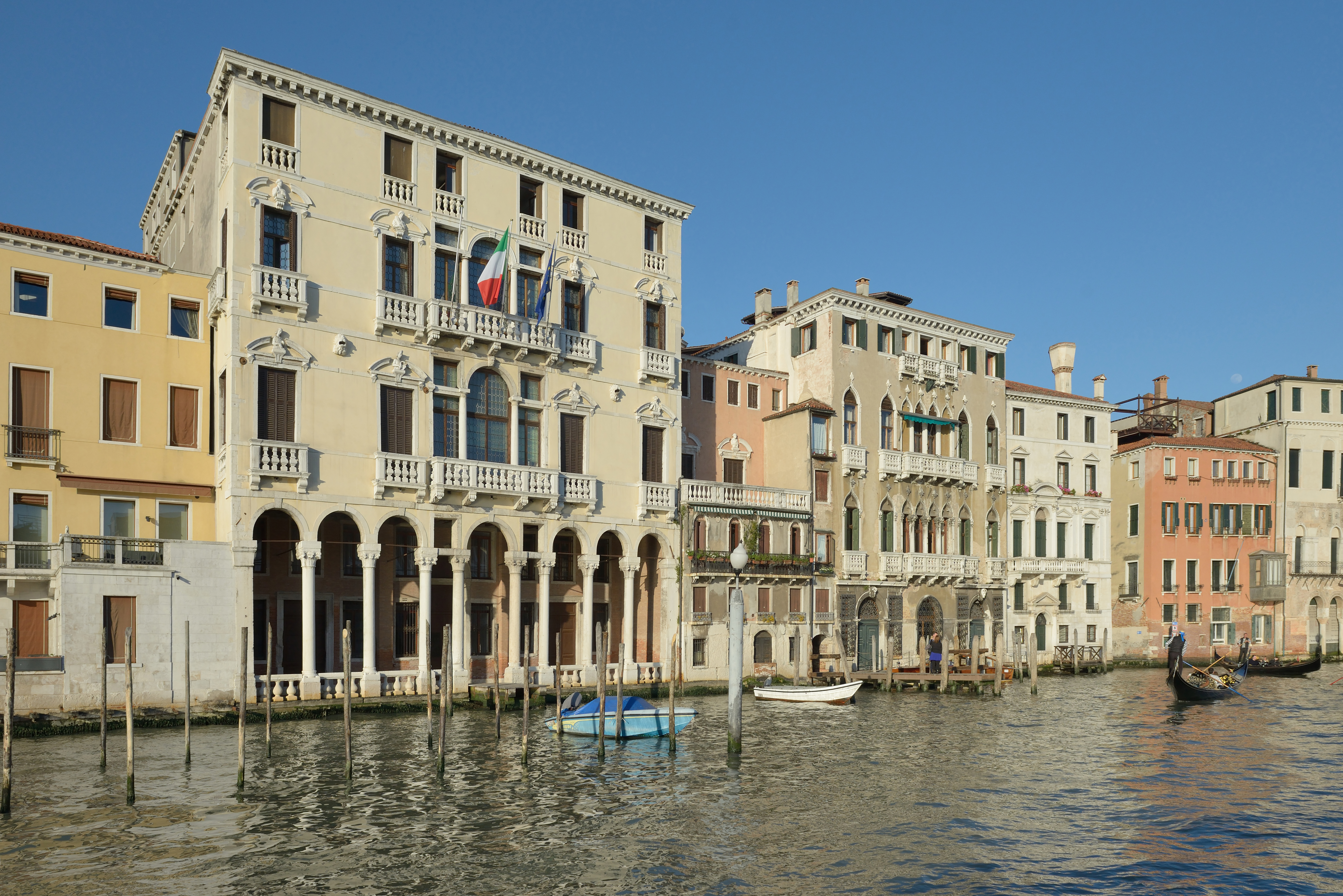
Palazzi Michiel dalle Colonne and Michiel del Brusà

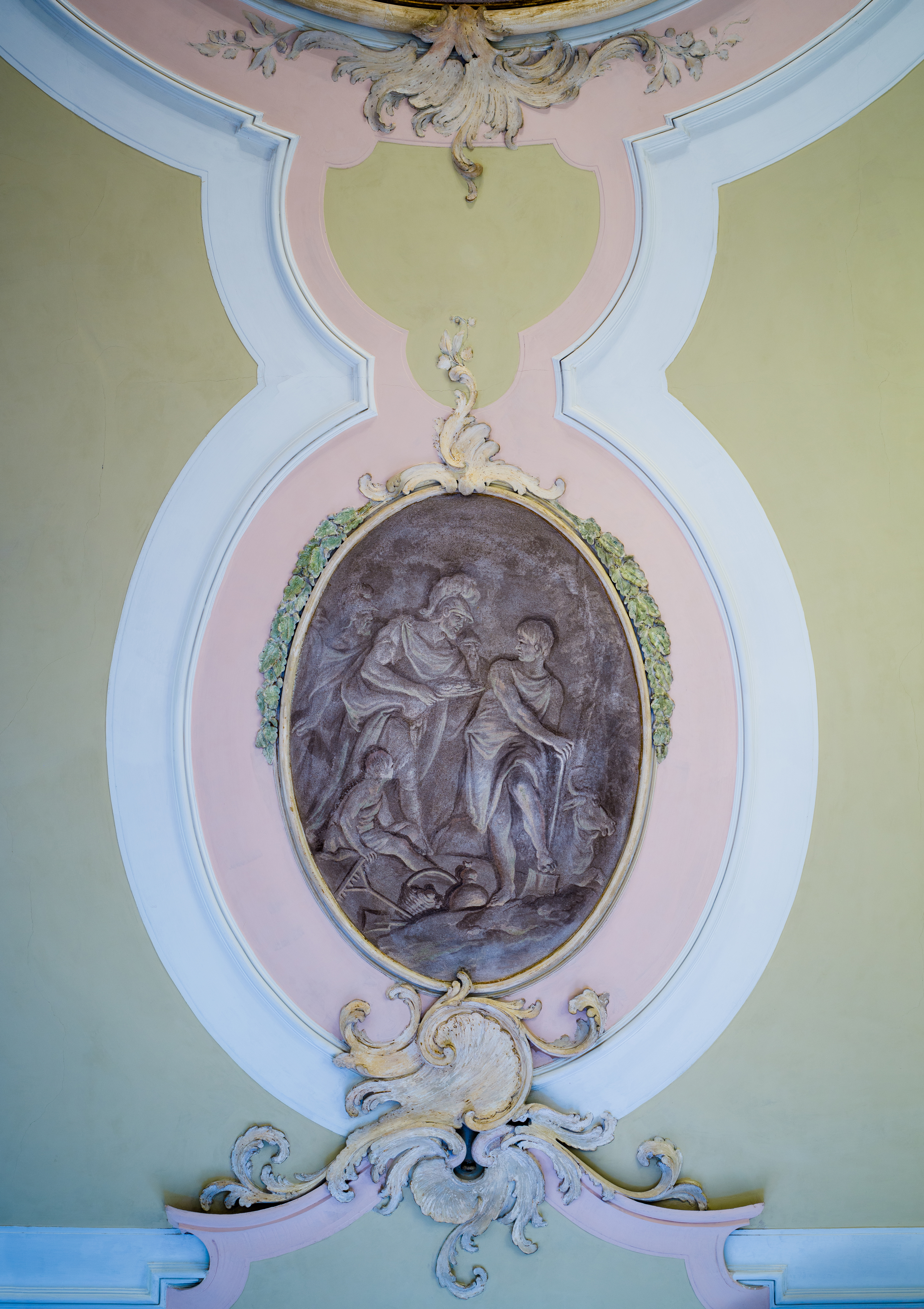
Grisaille in the palazzo

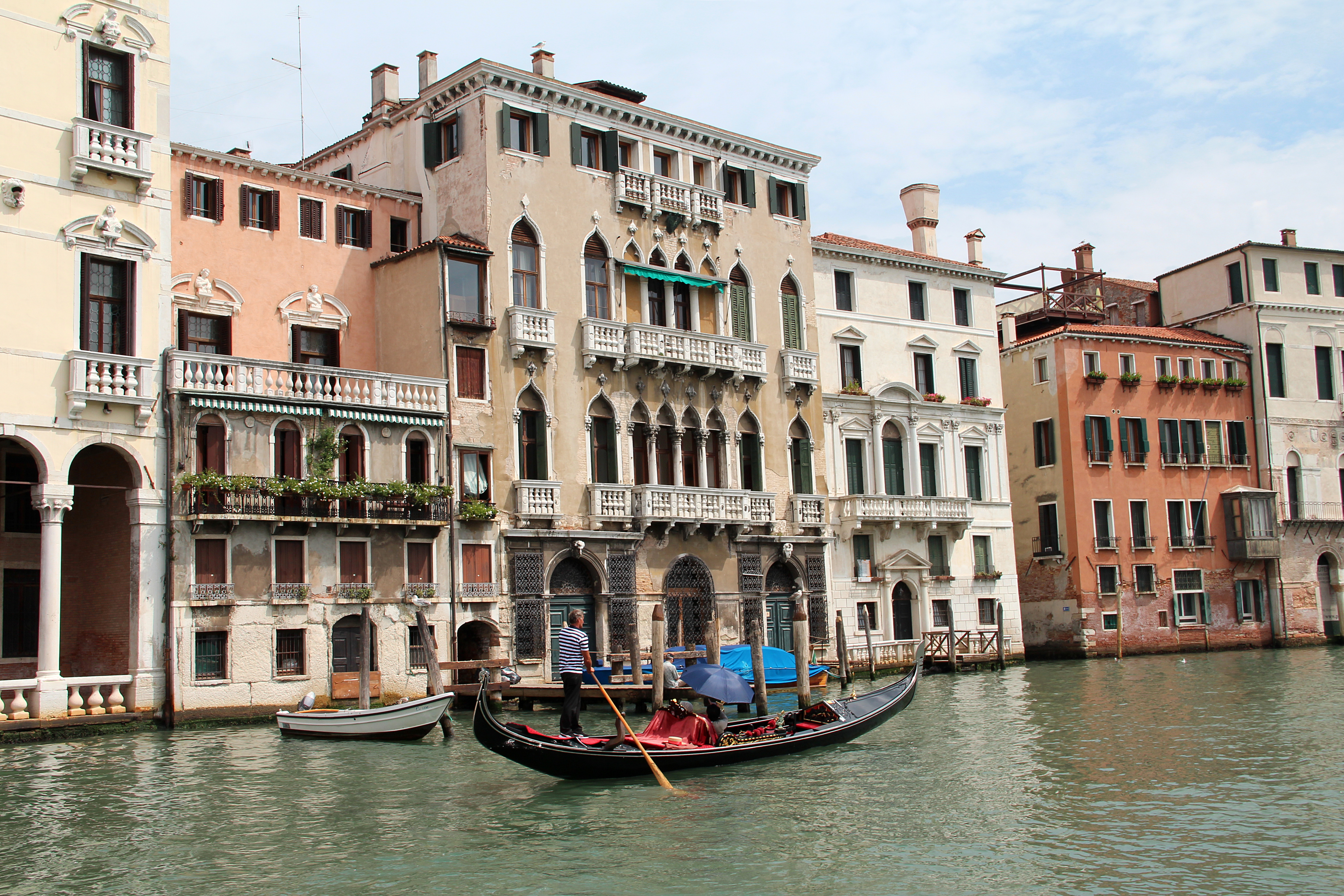
Gondolier sailing on the Grand Canal in front of Palazzo Michiel del Brusà in Venice.
