= Jacopo Guarana =

Italian painter

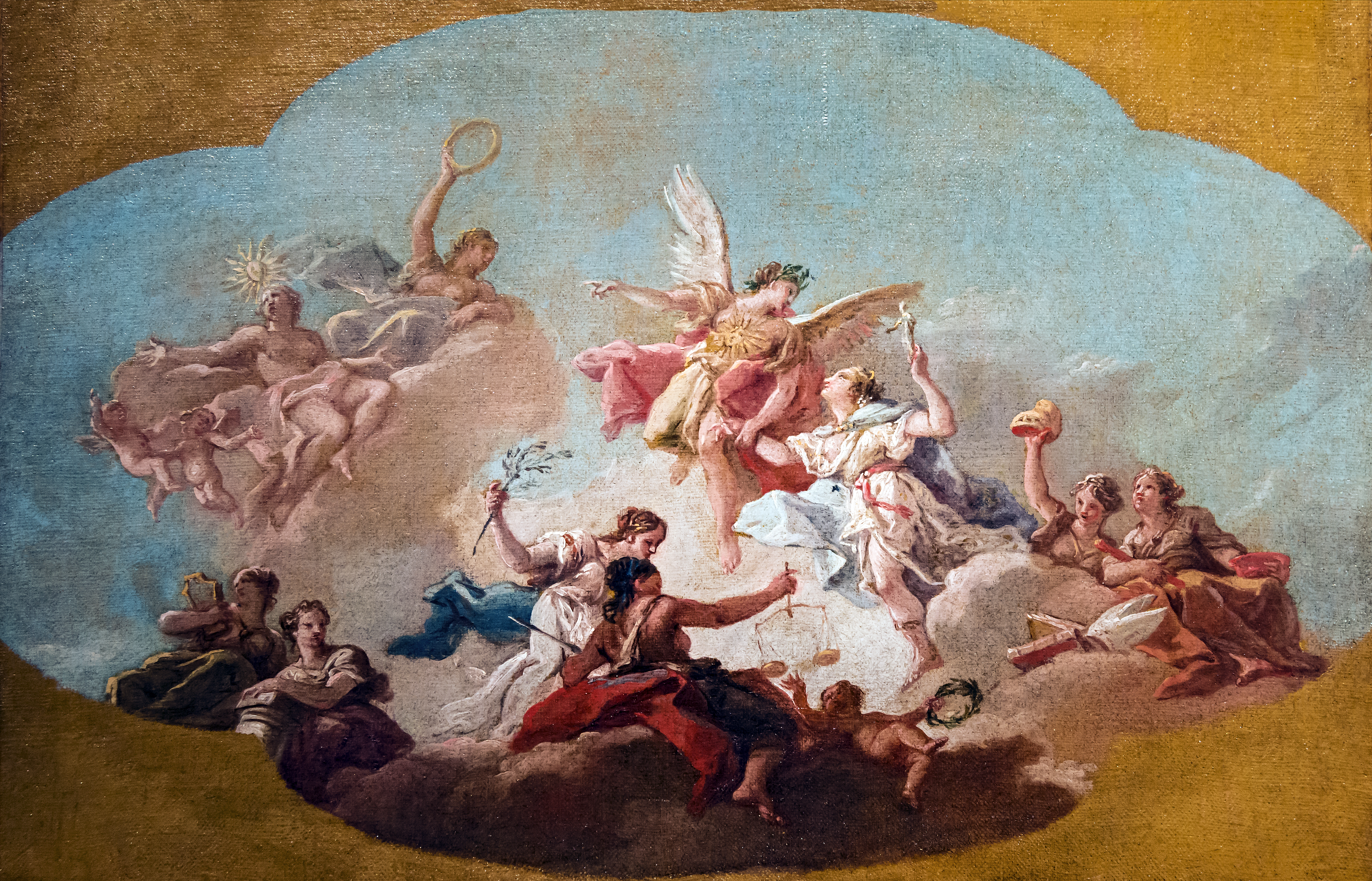
Allegory of the virtues Mocenigo, 1787

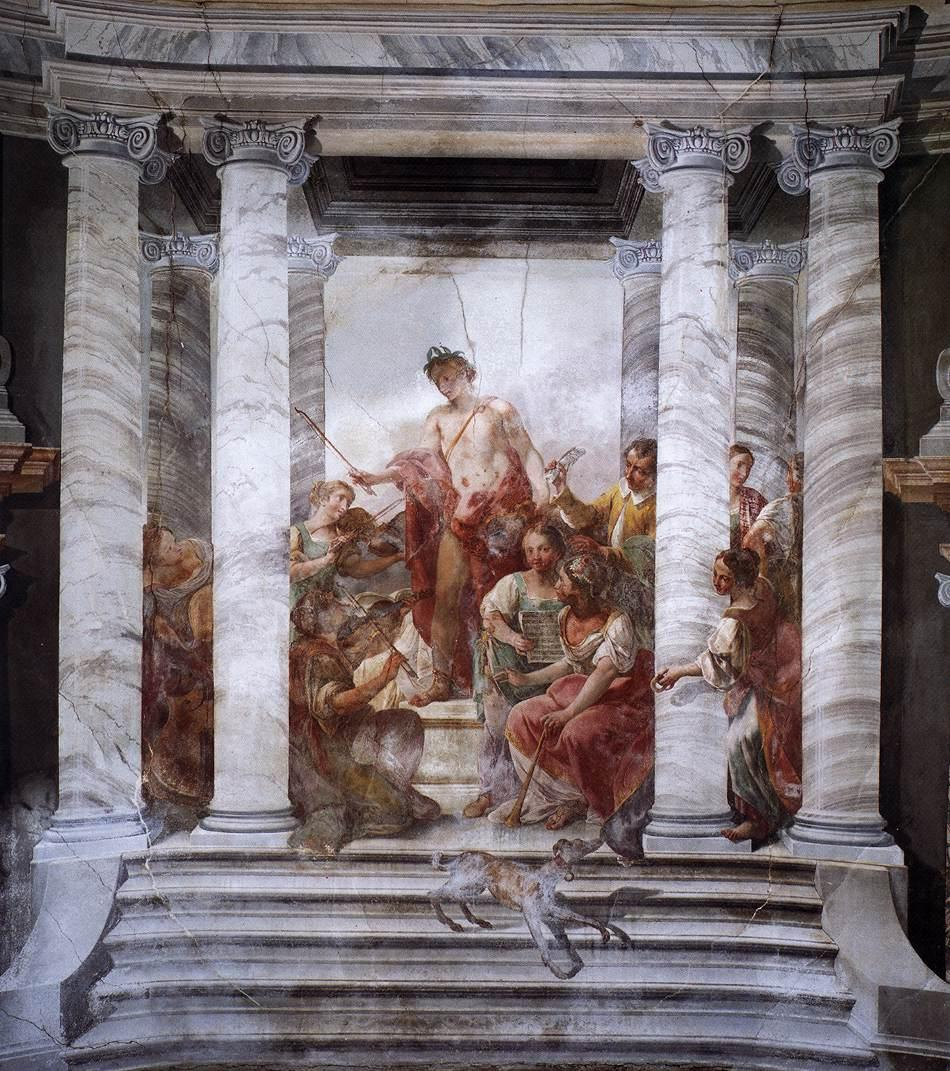
Apollo Conducting a Choir of Maidens (1776)

Jacopo Guarana (October 28, 1720 – April 18, 1808) was a Venetian painter of the late Baroque period who was born in Verona. He was active mainly in Venice and its mainland territories.

In 1750 he completed frescoes for the interior of Ca' Rezzonico and, in 1780, for the church of San Tomà. He also painted for the church of San Teonisto in Treviso and the Villa Contarini in Cinto Euganeo and helped decorate the Villa Pisani at Stra. Other works were completed for the Palazzo Balbi, Palazzo Boldù a San Felice, Palazzo Erizzo a San Martino, Palazzo Michiel del Brusà, and Palazzo Mocenigo a San Stae.

Guarana is the last remaining direct heir of the Tiepolesque tradition. He was a founding member of the Venetian Accademia di Belle Arti and is said to have studied under Sebastiano Ricci, then with Giovanni Battista Tiepolo.

Among his most popular works are the wall frescoes at the concert hall of the Ospedaletto, Venice. By the time he painted a Sacred heart of Jesus and Saints for the church of San Polo, his work would have been considered "retardataire", a glimpse of a lapsing past. His son, Vincenzo Guarana, born in 1742, was also a painter.

Pastellist Anna Pasetti was active as a copyist in Guarana's studio.
