= Palazzo Boldù a San Felice =

Coordinates: 40.8577°N 14.2516°E

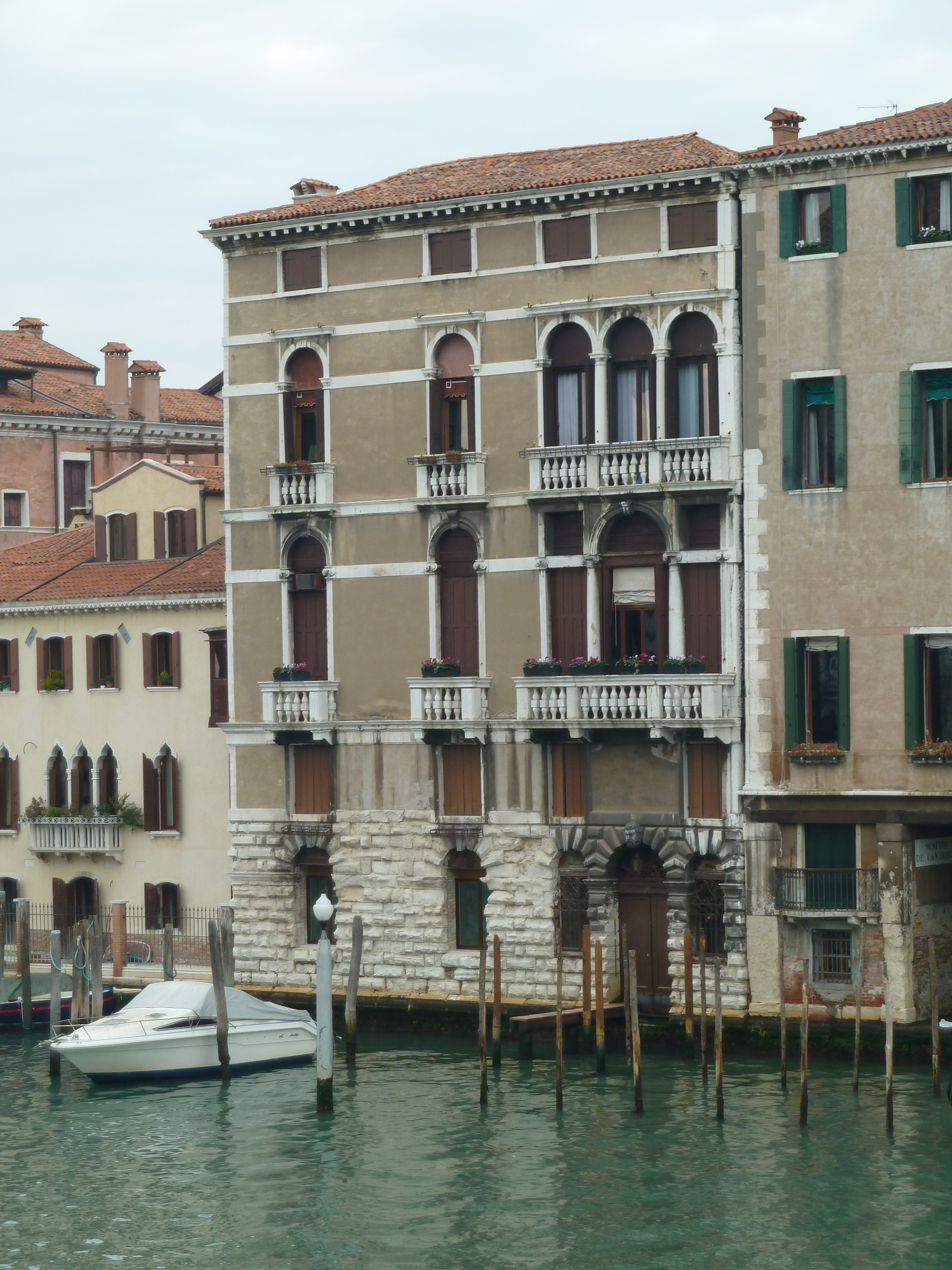
Palazzo Boldù

The Palazzo Boldù a San Felice is a palace located on the Canal Grande of Venice, between the Palazzetto Da Lezze and Palazzo Contarini Pisani in the Sestiere of Cannaregio, Venice, Italy.

== History ==
The palace was erected in the 16th century by the Boldù family, recently added to the Venetian Patriciate. The palace was reconstructed by the Ghisi family in the late 1600s, and then bought by the Contarini family, who owned the adjacent Palazzo Contarini Pisani. The interiors were frescoed by Jacopo Guarana.

In 1523, Giovanni Orsini, a condottiere fighting for the Republic of Venice lived here. In 1524, it lodged another mercenary, G. Francesco Gonzaga (called da Lucera). In 1657, the marriage of Adriana Ghisi married into the Boldù family, a patrician family from Conegliano. The male line of the Boldù of San Felice died out with Giuseppe Boldù, who had served as Podestà of Venice.

The palace also apparently once had frescoes by Francesco Fontebasso depicting the Rape of Europe; Diana and Endymion; and Judgement of Paris.

== Bibliography ==
- Brusegan, Marcello (2007). Newton & Compton (ed.). I Palazzi di Venezia. Roma. ISBN 978-88-541-0820-2.
