= Alessandro Rinaldi (painter) =

Italian painter

Alessandro Rinaldi (5 April 1839, Cremona – 1890 Rome) was an Italian painter.

He was initially trained with Gallo Gallina, then in the Brera Academy under Hayez, and by 1857 with Giuseppe Bertini. His most prominent work was Volta che scopre la pila.

In 1859, he enrolled in the Cacciatori delle Alpi, and he was one of the 16 garibaldini who, along with the Polish soldier Sadowski, first entered Como. Upon returning to painting, he exhibited Volta discovers the voltaic pile (battery) at the Brera.
