= San Tomà, Venice =

Church building in Venice, Italy

San Tomà
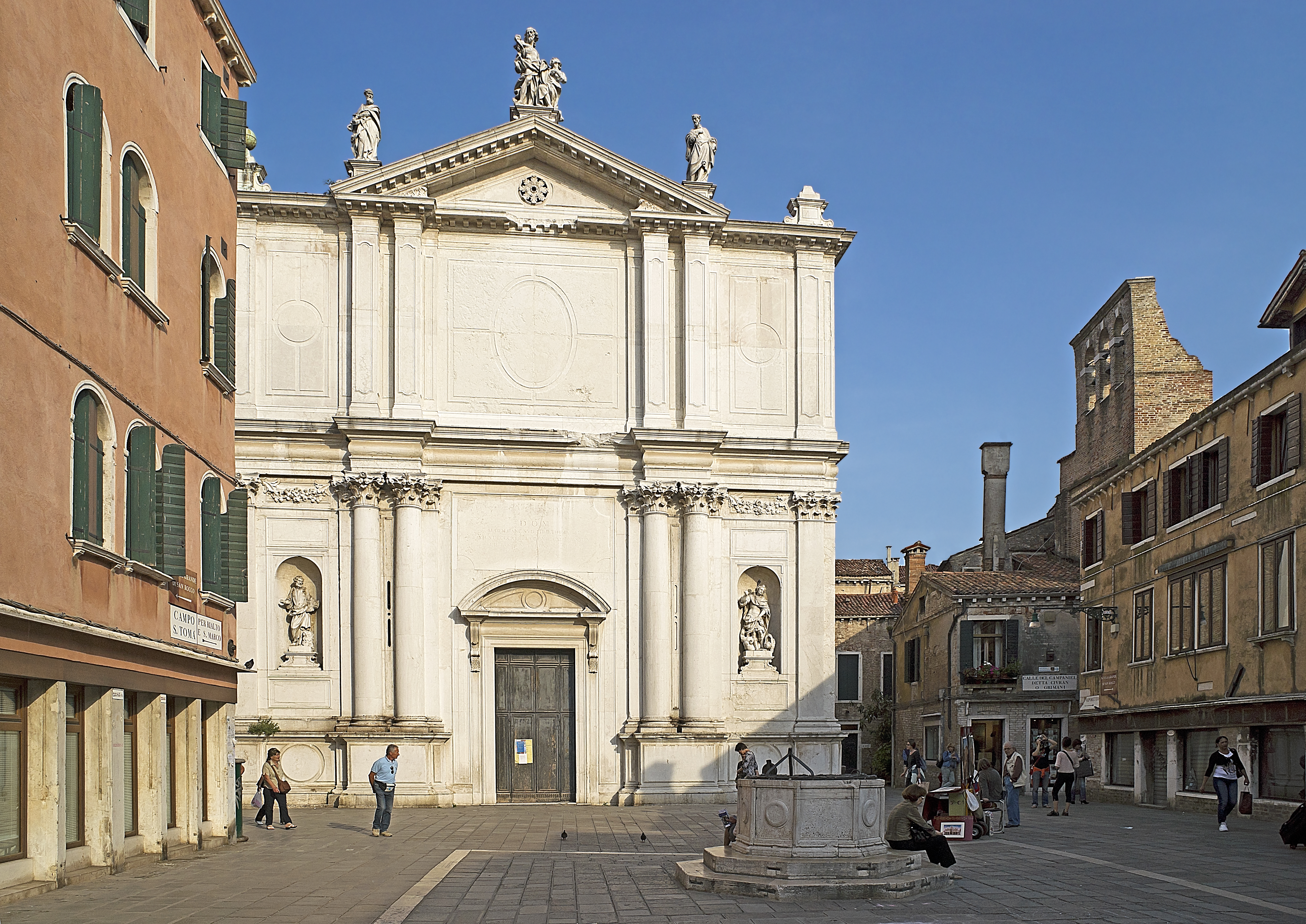
- Church of San Tomà

- Location within Venice Location within Italy

Religion
- Affiliation: Roman Catholic
- Province: Venice

Location
- Location: Venice, Italy
- Interactive map of San Tomà
- Coordinates: 45°26′09″N 12°19′40″E

Architecture
- Completed: 10th century

San Tomà (San Toma) is a church which is located in the sestiere of San Polo in Venice, Italy. It stands opposite the Scoletta dei Calegheri.

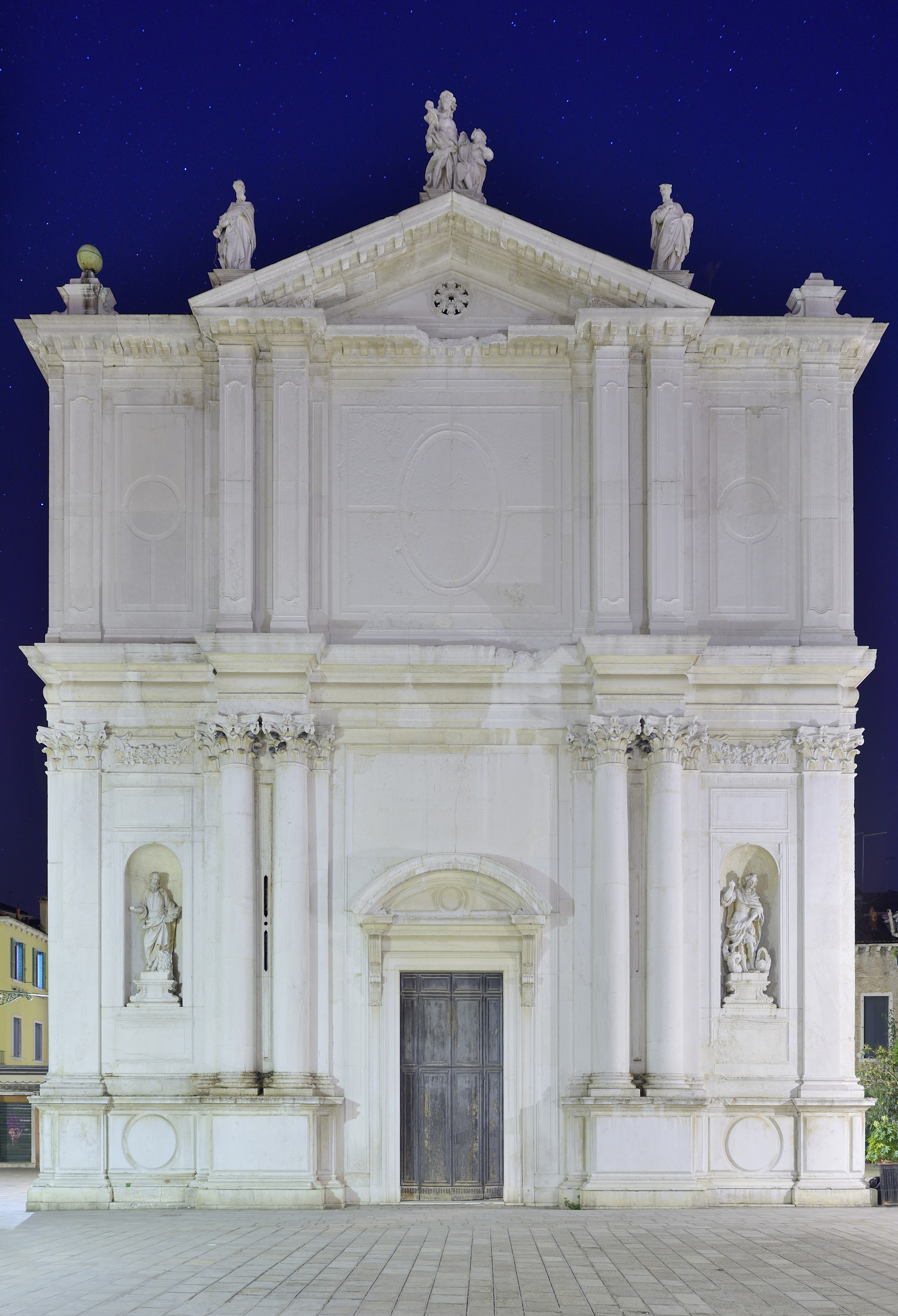
Facade of the church of San Tomà at night

The church is named after San Tommaso Apostolo (Saint Thomas the Apostle). A church on the site dates back to the tenth century, the present orientation was set in 1395, and the exterior and much of the interior decorations are due to reconstructions in the 16th and 17th centuries. For example, The Baroque architecture layout we see today was completed in 1652 by Giuseppe Sardi, using a design originally by Baldassare Longhena. The church was reinforced and the facade decorated with two statues in 1742 by Francesco Bognolo. Presently, the church is used for practice of Roman Catholic, Neocatechumenal Way services and functions.

Few of the movable interior decorations remain. The main altar once had statues of Saints Thomas and Peter (1616) sculpted in marble by Girolamo Campagna. It once had two altarpieces by Palma Vecchio: a Madonna and Child with St Francis and John the Baptist and a St Mark and St. Aniano. It also had a main altarpiece depicting Crucifixion Scene by Andrea Vicentino, who also had a number of other works inside the church. Frescoed on the walls of the nave and still extant is a depiction of the Martyrdom of St Thomas by Jacopo Guarana and an altarpiece of the Incredulity of St Thomas by Antonio Zanchi remains.

High on an outside wall, is the sarcophagus of Giovanni Priuli, a 14th-century war hero and senator. He lies with his feet resting on a small dog. On the left side above a portal, is a 15th-century relief of the Madonna della Misericordia (Our Lady of Mercy).

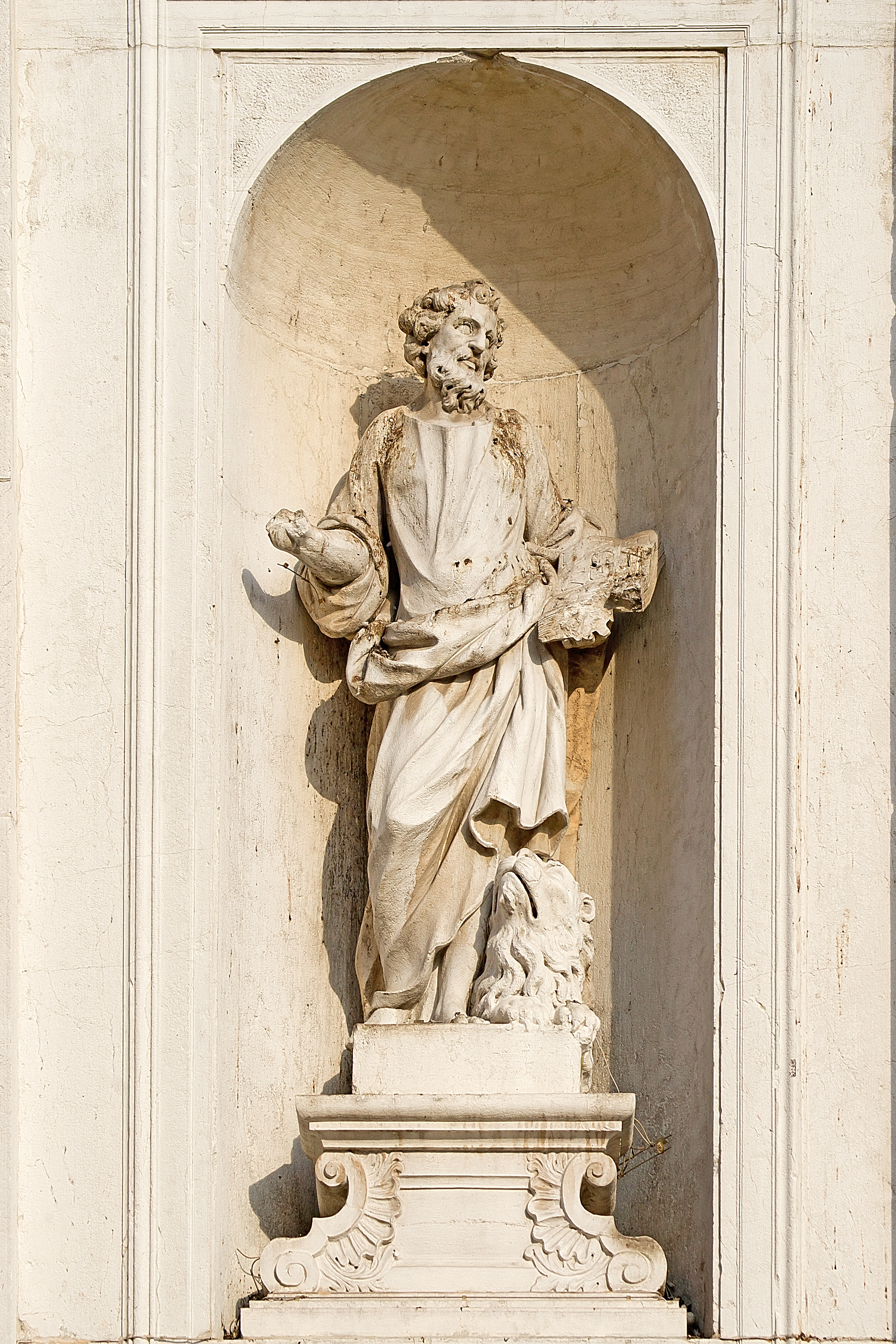
Facade Statue of St Mark by Francesco Bognolo

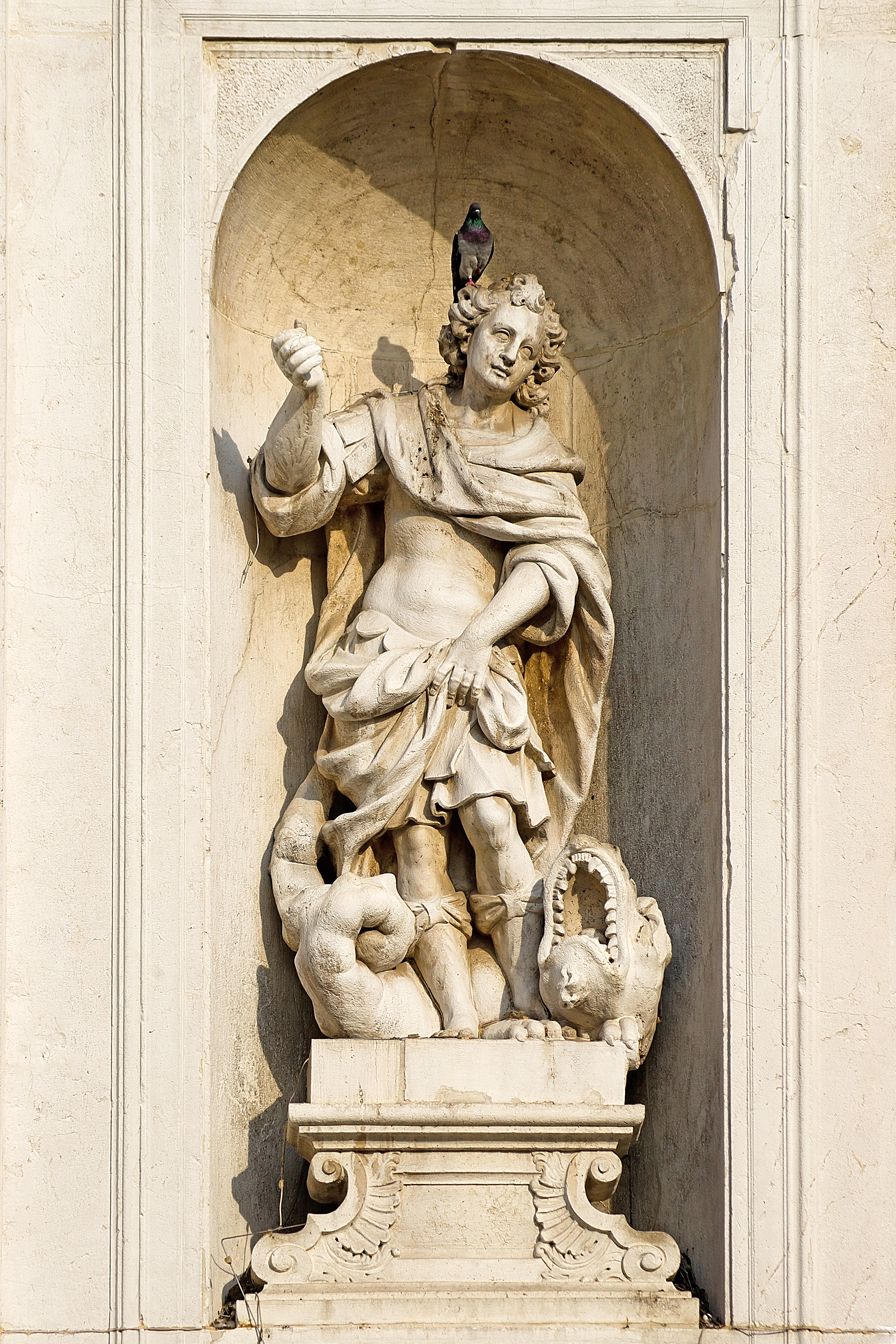
Facade, San Teodoro by Francesco Bognolo

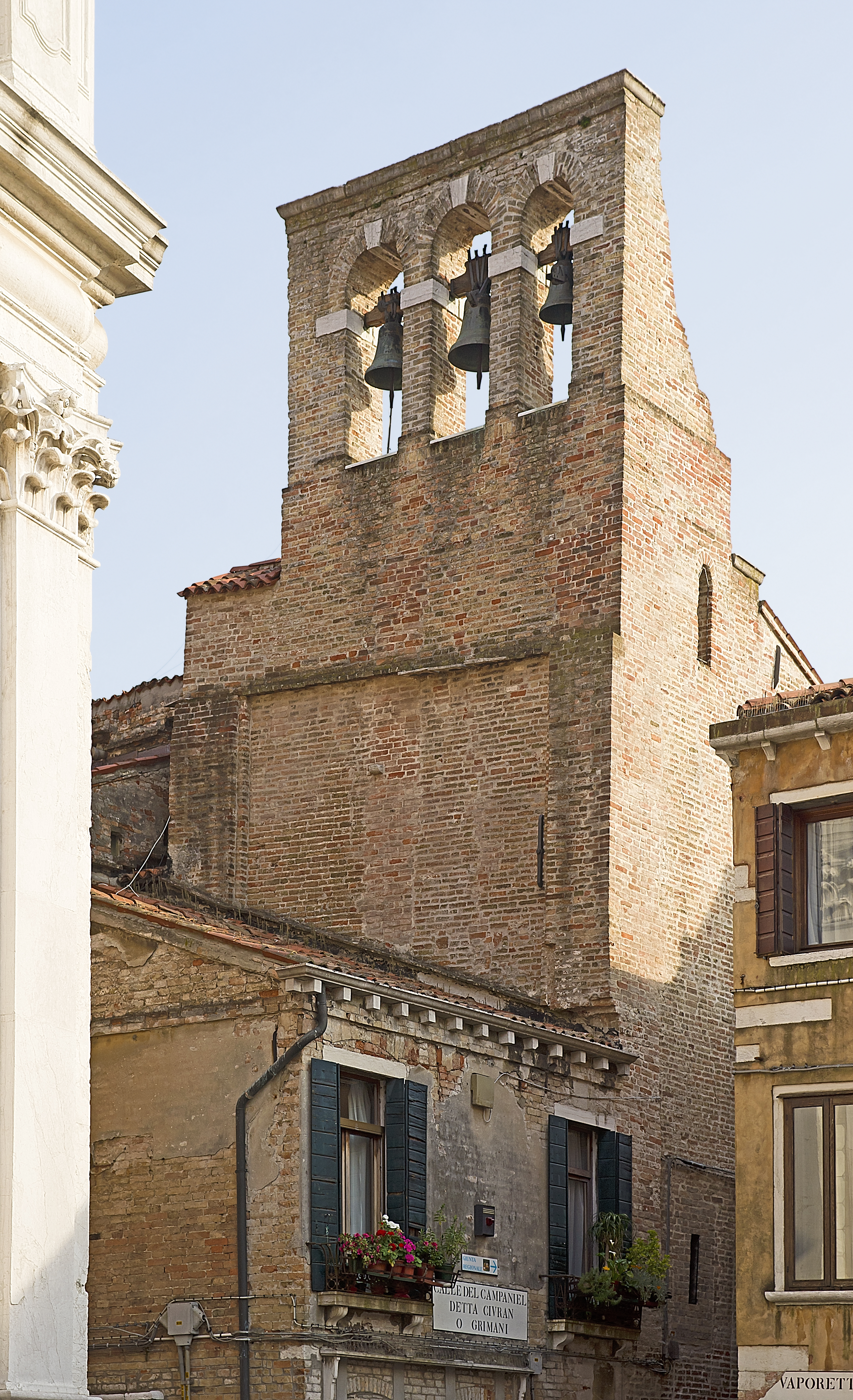
Belltower

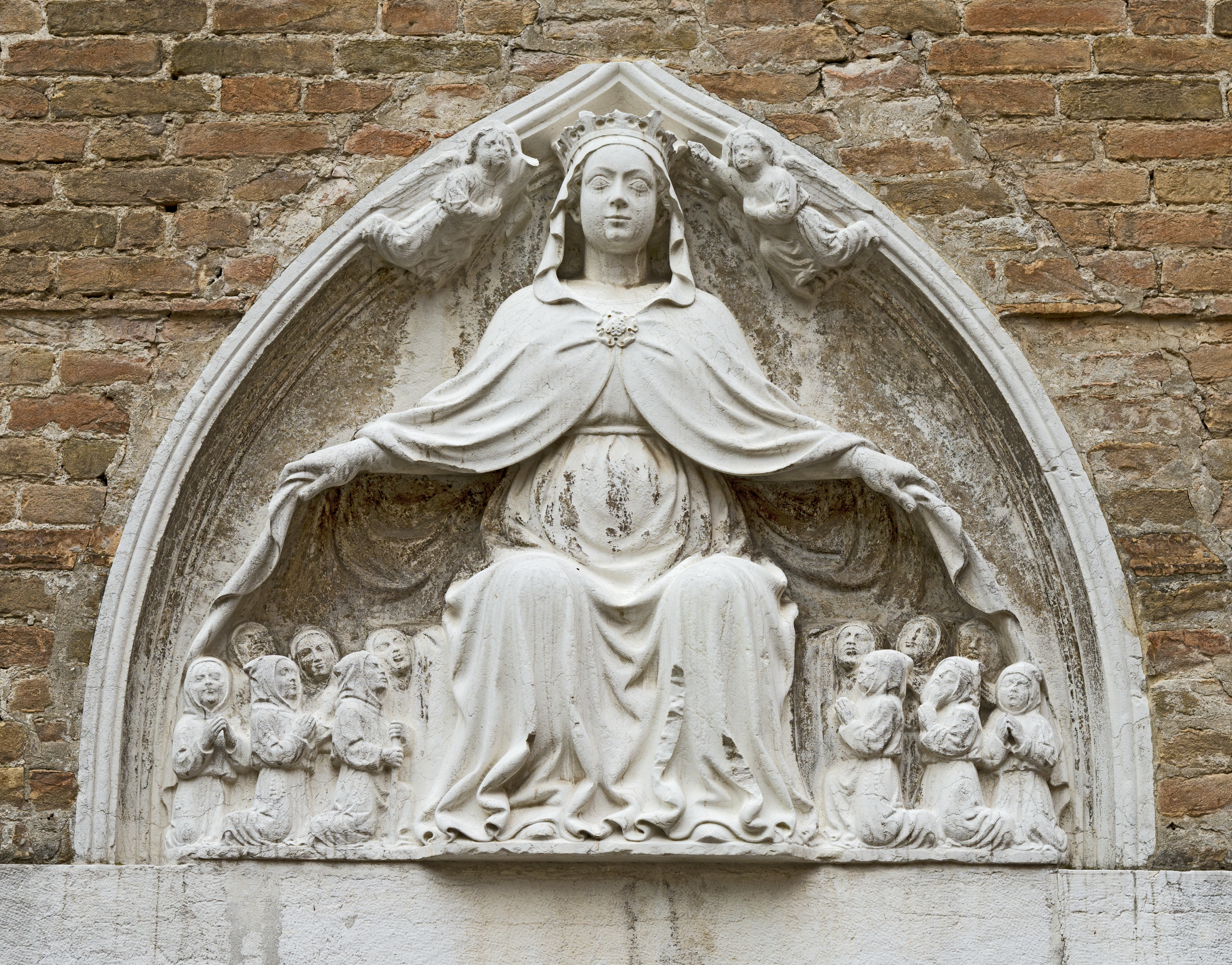
Madonna della Misericordia

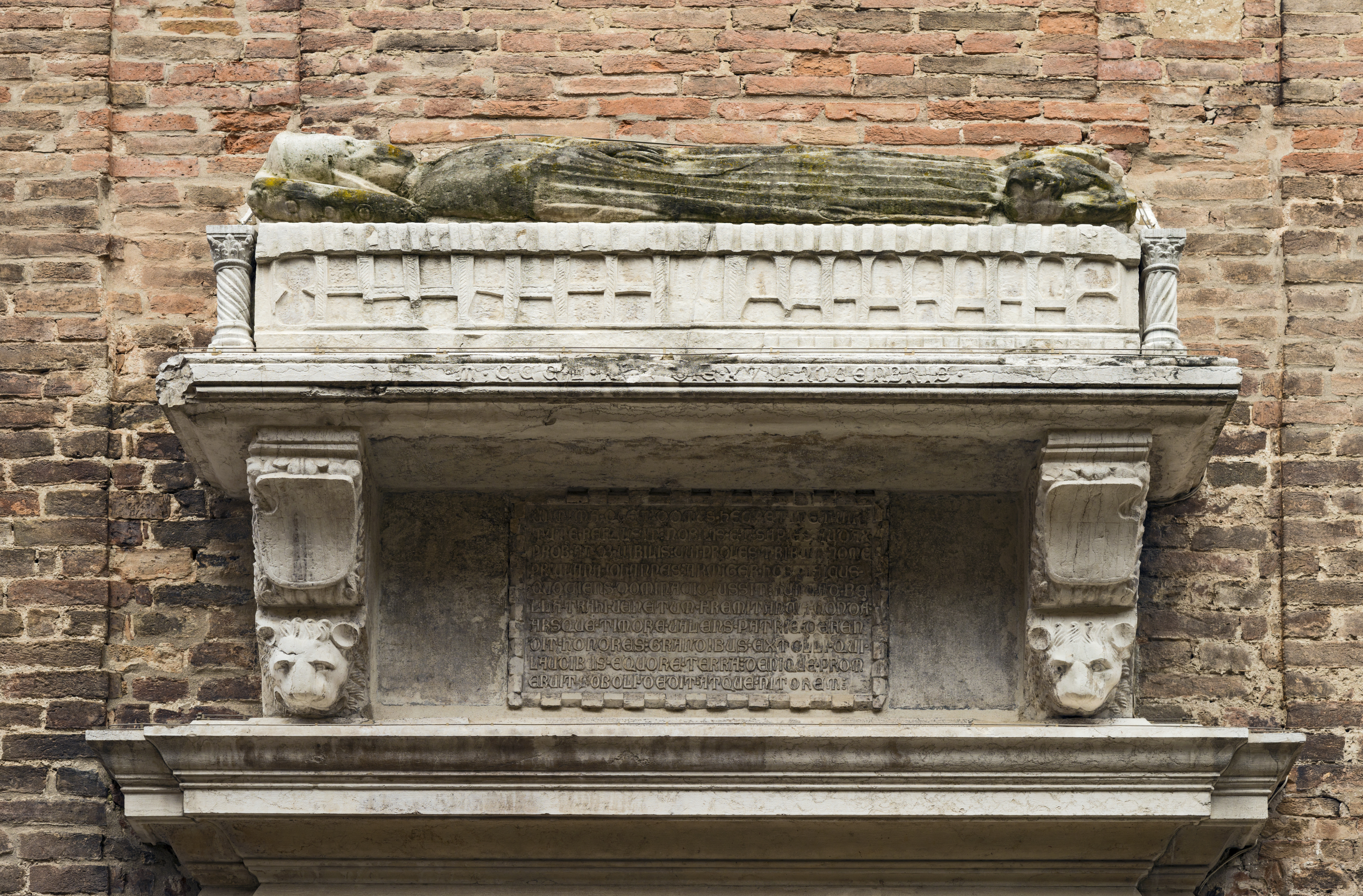
Giovanni Priuli, (sarcophagus) 14th-century
