= Andrea Rinaldi =

Italian footballer (2000–2020)

Personal information
- Date of birth: 23 June 2000
- Place of birth: Carate Brianza, Italy
- Date of death: 11 May 2020 (aged 19)
- Place of death: Varese, Italy
- Height: 1.73 m (5 ft 8 in)
- Position: Midfielder

Youth career
- –2013: Monza
- 2013–2018: Atalanta

Senior career*
Years	Team	Apps	(Gls)
2018–2020	Atalanta	0	(0)
2018–2019	→ Imolese (loan)	1	(0)
2019	→ Mezzolara (loan)	13	(0)
2019–2020	→ Legnano (loan)	23	(1)
Total		37	(1)
- * Club domestic league appearances and goals

Andrea Rinaldi (23 June 2000 – 11 May 2020) was an Italian footballer.

Rinaldi started his youth career in Cermenate and in Monza after spending five years at Atalanta. He died in May 2020 from an aneurysm after being loaned to Imolese, Mezzolara and Legnano.

== Club career ==
Rinaldi started his career in a Cermenate club and at Monza's youth set-up. In 2013, he joined Atalanta's youth sector, for whom he played for the Giovanissimi Regionali A, Allievi and Primavera squads always under Massimo Brambilla's management. For the U17s, he won the national league (in which he scored a goal in the final) and the supercup. After making only two appearances with Atalanta Primavera in the 2017–18 season, in July 2018, Imolese announced that Atalanta had loaned him to them. In Serie C, he only made an eight-minute appearance against Monza on 25 November 2018. He also had loan spells to Serie D side Mezzolara and to Legnano, making 13 league appearances. Rinaldi had made 23 league appearances and scored one goal.

== International career ==
While playing for the youth team of Atalanta, he received a call-up to the Italy U18

== Death ==
"President Antonio Percassi and the entire Atalanta family, deeply shocked, share the grief of the family and A.C. Legnano for the passing of Andrea Rinaldi. [...] Always helpful and positive, he knew how to make himself well liked by everyone. Just as on the field you were always the last to give up, this time too you fought with all your strength not to fly away too soon. But that kind smile of yours will always remain alive in the hearts of those who were lucky enough to know you."

— Atalanta, his former team, on Rinaldi, May 2020

On 8 May 2020, Rinaldi suffered a ruptured aneurysm while training in his house in Cermenate. He was immediately rushed to the hospital in Varese to try to save him, but on the morning of 11 May, his heart stopped beating. His funeral was held three days later in Stadio Cermenate; hundreds attended the funeral. Legnano ultimately retired the number 8 jersey (the number he had worn), and gave it to his family.

== Style of play ==
Posthumously, he was described by Sky Sport Italy as "a quick and dynamic midfielder with extraordinary athletic ability and speed, the classic modern midfielder, a nightmare for opposing midfielders and for defences when he inserted himself".

== Career statistics ==
Appearances and goals by club, season and competition
Club	Season	League			Coppa Italia		Other		Total	
Club	Season	Division	Apps	Goals	Apps	Goals	Apps	Goals	Apps	Goals
Imolese (loan)	2018–19	Serie C	1	0	0	0	0	0	4	0
Mezzolara (loan)	2018–19	Serie D	13	0	0	0	0	0	14	0
Legnano (loan)	2019–20	Serie D	23	1	0	0	0	0	25	1
Career total			37	1	0	0	1	0	43	1
