= Gallo Gallina =

Italian painter and engraver

Gallo Gallina (1778–1837) was an Italian painter and engraver, working in a Neoclassical style. He was active also as a lithographer.

He helped Giulio Ferrario complete the volumes of Costumi antichi e Moderni. He became the custodian of the archaeological museum in the Brera Academy. He painted a canvas for the baptistery of Cremona Cathedral.
