= Scrotal septum =

Layer of fibrous tissue in the scrotum

Septum of scrotum
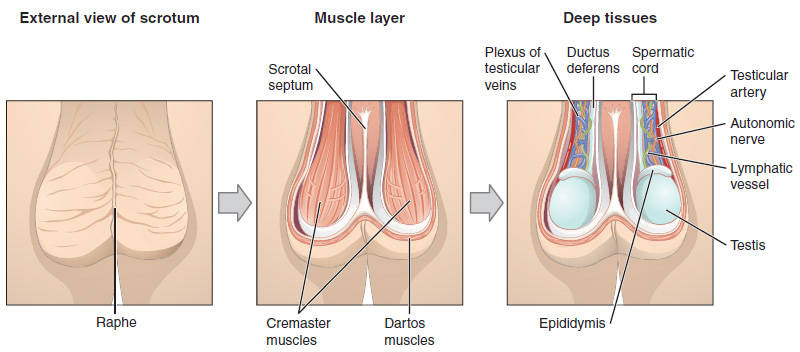
- Schematic sections of scrotum

Details

Identifiers
- Latin: septum scroti

The septum of scrotum or scrotal septum is an incomplete vertical wall (septum) that divides the scrotum into two compartments –each containing a single testis. It consists of flexible connective tissue and non-striated muscle (dartos fascia). The site of the median septum is apparent on the surface of the scrotum along a median longitudinal ridge called the scrotal raphe. The perineal raphe further extends forward to the undersurface of the penis and backward to the anal opening. The purpose of the median septum is to compartmentalize each testis in order to prevent friction or trauma.

The scrotal skin is vascularized via the two external pudendal arteries and the internal pudendal artery. The central territory of the scrotum receives blood through the terminal branches (septal arteries) of the two main scrotal arteries, themselves extensions of the pudendal and perineal arteries, that run deeply on both sides of the scrotal septum. A separate branch of the perineal artery has also been shown to vascularize the scrotal raphe.

The nerves on the ventral side of the proximal penis and scrotum originate mainly from the perineal nerves, which in turn arises from the pudendal nerves. At the penoscrotal junction, nerves on both sides of the ventral penis coalesce to be directed into the interscrotal septum. The scrotal septum is shown to be densely innervated, with both hemiscrota receiving innervation separately by horizontally distributed nerves arising from the septum.

The scrotal septum is used in reconstructive surgery to restore tissue and/or reproductive organs injured or severed by trauma.

== See also ==
- Linea nigra
- Perineal raphe
- Pierre Sebileau
- Sebileau's muscle

== Bibliography ==
Books

- Van De Graaff, Kent M.; Fox, Stuart Ira (1989). Concepts of Human Anatomy and Physiology. Dubuque, Iowa: William C. Brown Publishers. ISBN 0697056759.
- Elson, Lawrence; Kapit, Wynn (1977). The Anatomy Coloring. New York City: Harper & Row. ISBN 0064539148.
- "Gross Anatomy Image". Medical Gross Anatomy Atlas Images. University of Michigan Medical School. 1997. Archived from the original on August 19, 2016.
- Berkow, Robert (1977). The Merck Manual of Medical Information; Home Edition. Whitehouse Station, New Jersey: Merck Research Laboratories. ISBN 0911910875.
