= Labial nerve =

Labial nerves can refer:

- Posterior labial nerves, branches of the pudendal nerve
- Anterior labial nerves, branches of the ilioinguinal nerve
- Superior labial nerve, a branch of the maxillary nerve
