= Median raphe =

The term median raphe can refer to one of four different anatomical structures:

- The pharyngeal raphe
- The palatine raphe
- The penile raphe
- The perineal raphe, also known as the "median r. of perineum"
