= Superficial external pudendal =

Superficial external pudendal can refer to:

- Superficial external pudendal vein
- Superficial external pudendal artery
