= Anterior labial nerves =

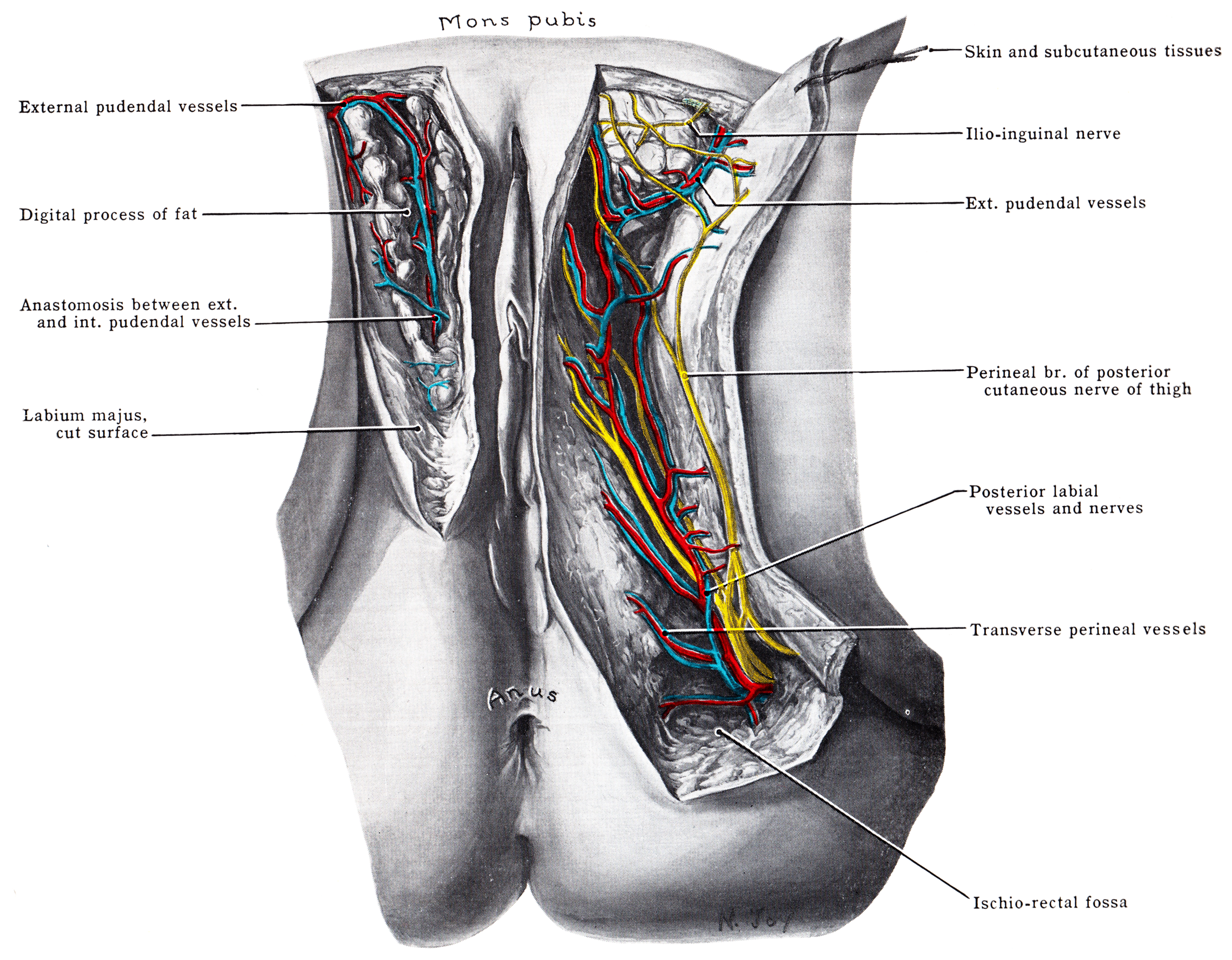
- Anterior view of female perineum

Details
- From: Ilioinguinal nerve

Identifiers
- Latin: nervi labiales anteriores
- TA98: A14.2.07.007
- TA2: 6500
- FMA: 75478

The anterior labial nerves are branches of the ilioinguinal nerve, which innervate the labia majora. The equivalent nerves in the male are the anterior scrotal nerves.

== See also ==
- Posterior labial nerves
- Posterior labial veins
- Posterior scrotal nerves
- Posterior scrotal veins
