= Posterior scrotal branches =

Posterior scrotal branches may refer to:

- Posterior scrotal nerves
- Posterior scrotal branches of the internal pudendal artery
