= Scrotal nerves =

Scrotal nerves may refer to:

- Anterior scrotal nerves
- Posterior scrotal nerves
