= Claude Dufourmentel =

French plastic surgeon

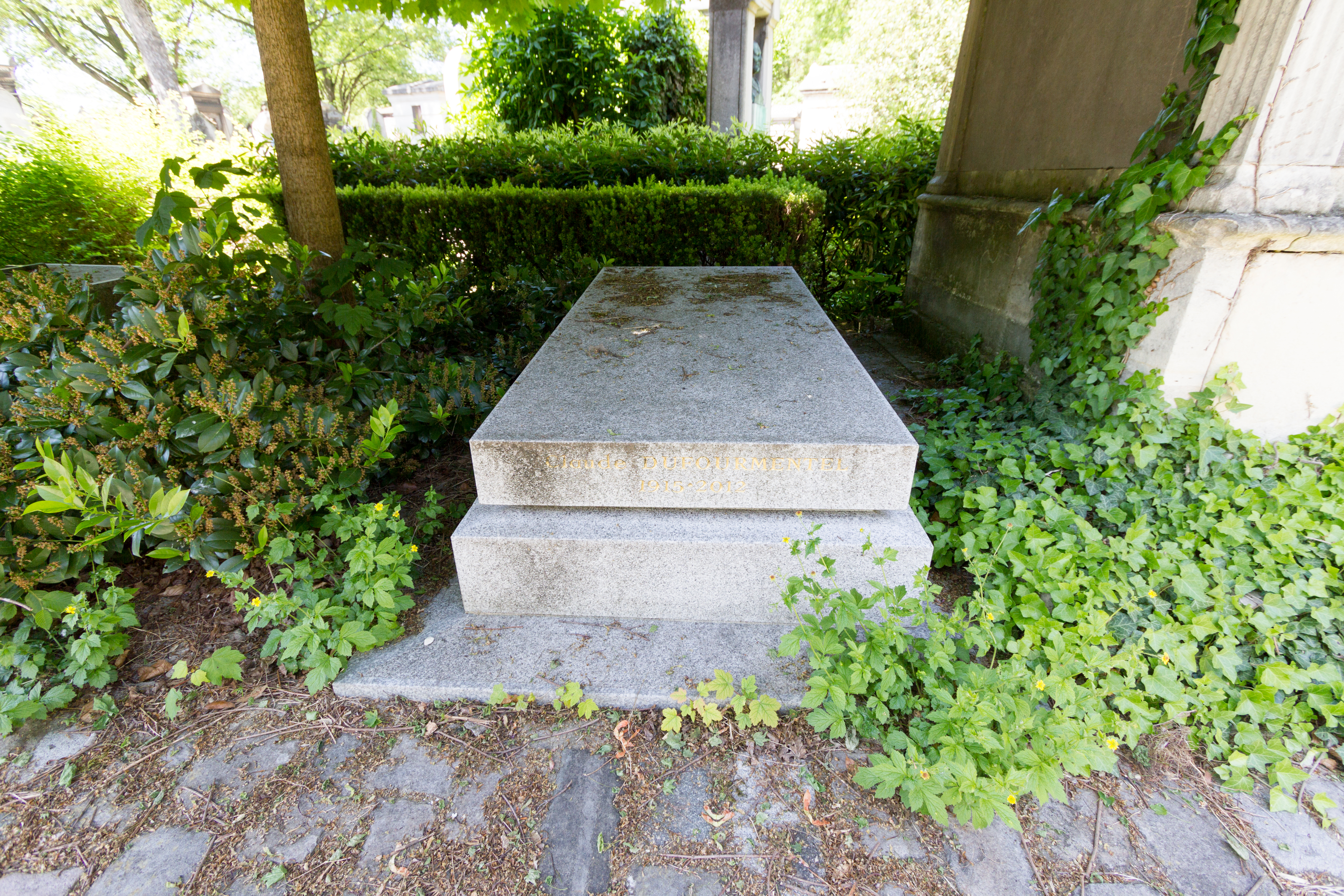
Père-Lachaise cemetery.

Claude Jules Pierre Dufourmentel (31 January 1915 – 1 December 2012) was a French plastic surgeon from Paris who described a skin flap for reconstructing rhomboid defects in 1962. This flap has been commonly referred to as the "Dufourmentel flap." He was the son of Léon Dufourmentel and maternal grandson of Pierre Sebileau. His brothers Gérard and Philippe were also surgeons.
