= Pudendal arteries =

Group of arteries

Schema of arteries arising from the iliac and femoral arteries

The pudendal arteries are a group of arteries which supply many of the muscles and organs of the pelvic cavity. The arteries include the internal pudendal artery, the superficial external pudendal artery, and the deep external pudendal artery.

The internal pudendal artery branches off the internal iliac artery, the main artery of the pelvis, and supplies blood to the sex organs. The internal pudendal artery gives rise to the perineal artery and the inferior rectal artery.

The superficial external pudendal artery arises from the medial side of the femoral artery. It supplies the male scrotum and the female labia majora.
