= Scrotal arteries =

Scrotal arteries may refer to:

- Anterior scrotal arteries, branches of the deep external pudendal artery
- Posterior scrotal arteries, branches of the internal pudendal artery
