= External pudendal artery =

External pudendal artery may refer to:

- Superficial external pudendal artery, one of the pudendal arteries, it arises from the medial side of the femoral artery
- Deep external pudendal artery, one of the pudendal arteries, it is more deeply seated than the superficial external pudendal artery
