= Posterior labial nerves =

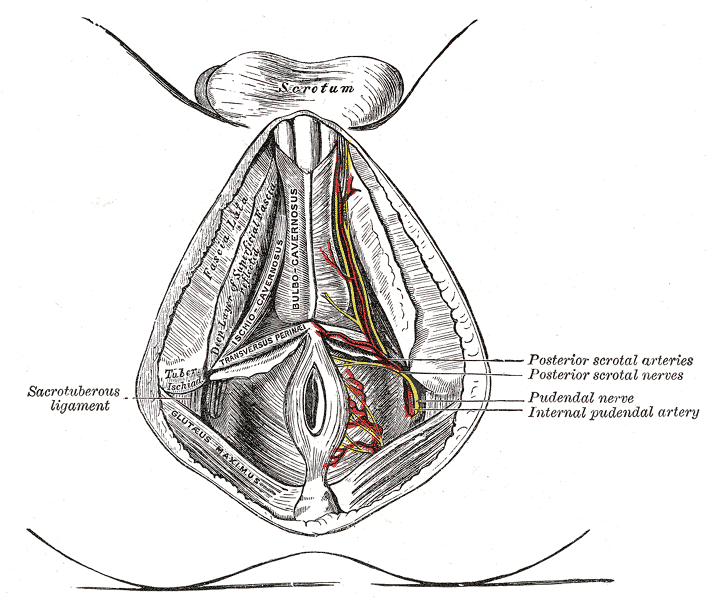
- Posterior labial nerves labeled below in yellow

Details
- From: Perineal nerve

Identifiers
- Latin: nervi labiales posteriores
- TA98: A14.2.07.040F
- TA2: 6558
- FMA: 21868

The posterior labial nerves are superficial branches of the perineal nerve, which in itself is a branch of the pudendal nerve. The posterior labial nerves provide sensation to the labia majora and labia minora and surrounding skin. They also innervate the vestibule, or entrance, of the vagina.

The counterparts in males are the posterior scrotal nerves.

== See also ==
- Anterior labial nerves
- Posterior labial veins
- Anterior scrotal nerves
- Posterior scrotal veins
