= Perineal branches of posterior femoral cutaneous nerve =

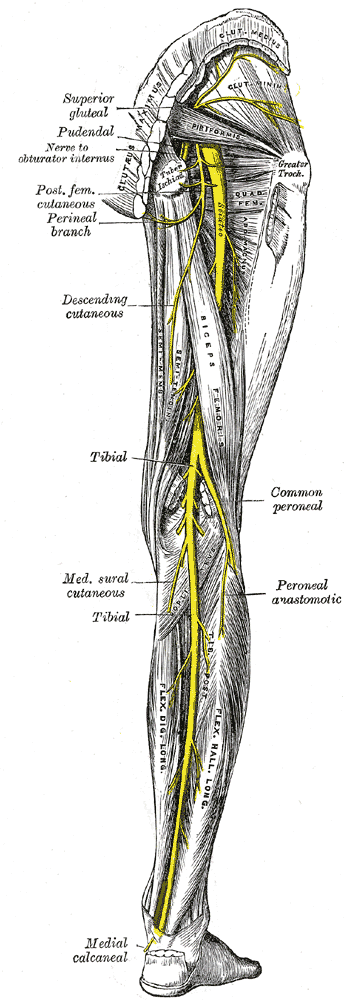
- Nerves of the right lower extremity. Posterior view. (Perineal branch labeled at upper left.)

Details
- From: Posterior femoral cutaneous nerve

Identifiers
- Latin: rami perineales nervi cutanei femoris posterioris
- TA98: A14.2.07.035
- TA2: 6568
- FMA: 21847

The perineal branches of the posterior femoral cutaneous nerve are distributed to the skin at the upper and medial side of the thigh.

One long perineal branch, inferior pudendal (long scrotal nerve), curves forward below and in front of the ischial tuberosity, pierces the fascia lata, and runs forward beneath the superficial fascia of the perineum to the skin of the scrotum in the male, and of the labium majus in the female.

It communicates with the inferior anal nerves and the posterior scrotal nerves.

== See also ==
- Posterior cutaneous nerve of thigh
