= Pierre Sebileau =

French surgeon

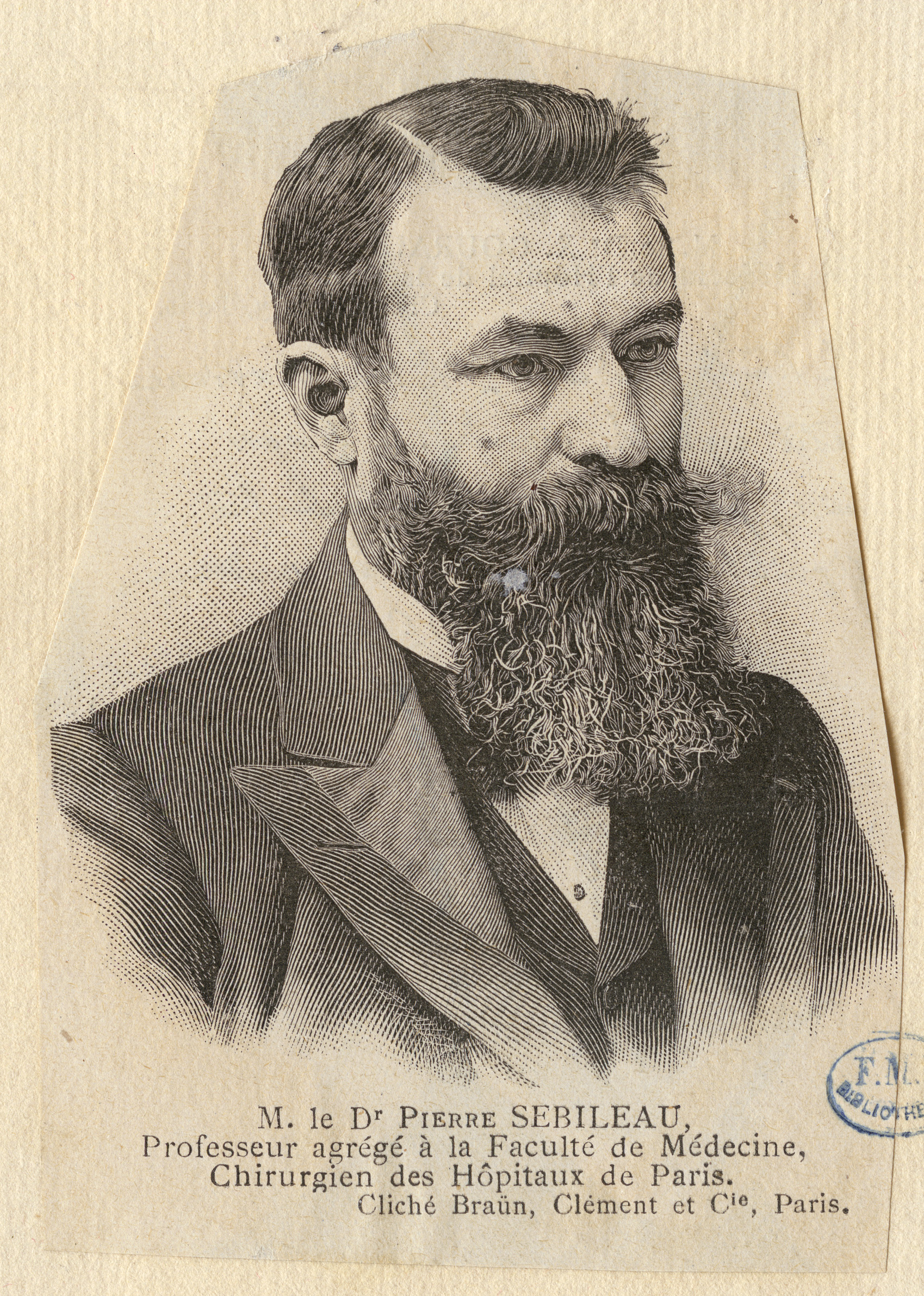
Pierre Sebileau

Pierre Sebileau (18 October 1860 – 4 October 1953) was a French surgeon born in Saint-Fort-sur-Gironde, a commune in Charente-Maritime. He was father-in-law to plastic surgeon Léon Dufourmentel (1884–1957).

He served as an interne in hospitals of Bordeaux (from 1879) and Paris (from 1884), where he later worked as an anatomical prosector (1888). Subsequently, he became a surgeon at Hôpital Lariboisière, specializing in the field of otorhinolaryngology. In 1893, he became an associate to the Faculty of Medicine in Paris.

In addition to his work with ear, nose and throat concerns, Sebileau made contributions in his investigations involving diseases of the genitourinary system and the kidneys. His name is associated with "Sebileau's muscle", described as deep fibres of the dartos tunic which pass into the scrotal septum.

== Selected writings ==
- Démonstrations d'anatomie; région temporale, région parotidienne, région sus-hyoïdienne, région sus-claviculaire, région sous-clavière, région mammaire, région costale, 1892 – Anatomical demonstrations, etc.
- Les enveloppes des testicules; les bourses, le crémaster, la vaginale, la descente du testicle, 1897 – The envelopes of the testicles, etc.
- Maladies des organes génitaux de l'homme, 1916 – Diseases of the genital organs.
- Le carrefour aéro-digestif, le larynx, le pharynx, 1924 – The aero-digestive, larynx, pharynx.
- Cancer de la langue, 1932 – Cancer of the tongue.
