= Chyloderma =

Swelling in the scrotum as a result of chronic lymphatic obstruction

- Other names: lymphscrotum or elephantiasis scroti
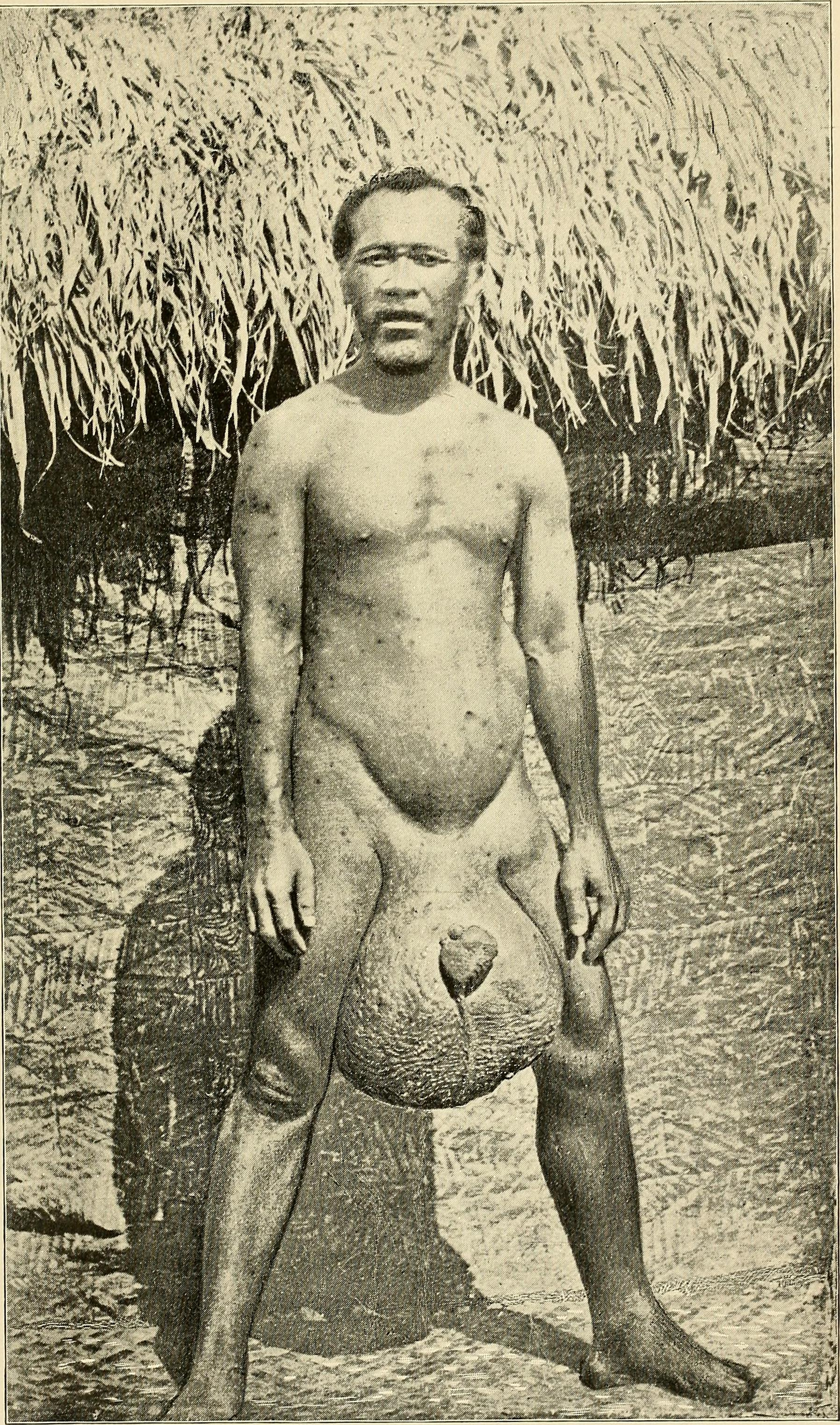
- Elephantiasis caused by infection with a filarial worm circa 1892
- Specialty: Genitourinary
- Symptoms: Progressive swelling of the scrotum and surrounding tissues
- Complications: Buried Penis, Hygiene issues, Permanent tissue damage
- Causes: Genetic, Nematode Infection, Radiotherapy, Trauma
- Treatment: Surgical excision and reconstruction

Chyloderma is swelling of the scrotum resulting from chronic lymphatic obstruction. Obstruction may be caused by infection, such as with a nematode like Wuchereria bancrofti, or long-term Chlamydia trachomatis; genetic conditions like hereditary lymphedema; or as a result of tissue damage either via trauma, lymphnode removal, or radiotherapy. This condition is also known as lymphscrotum or elephantiasis scroti.

== See also ==
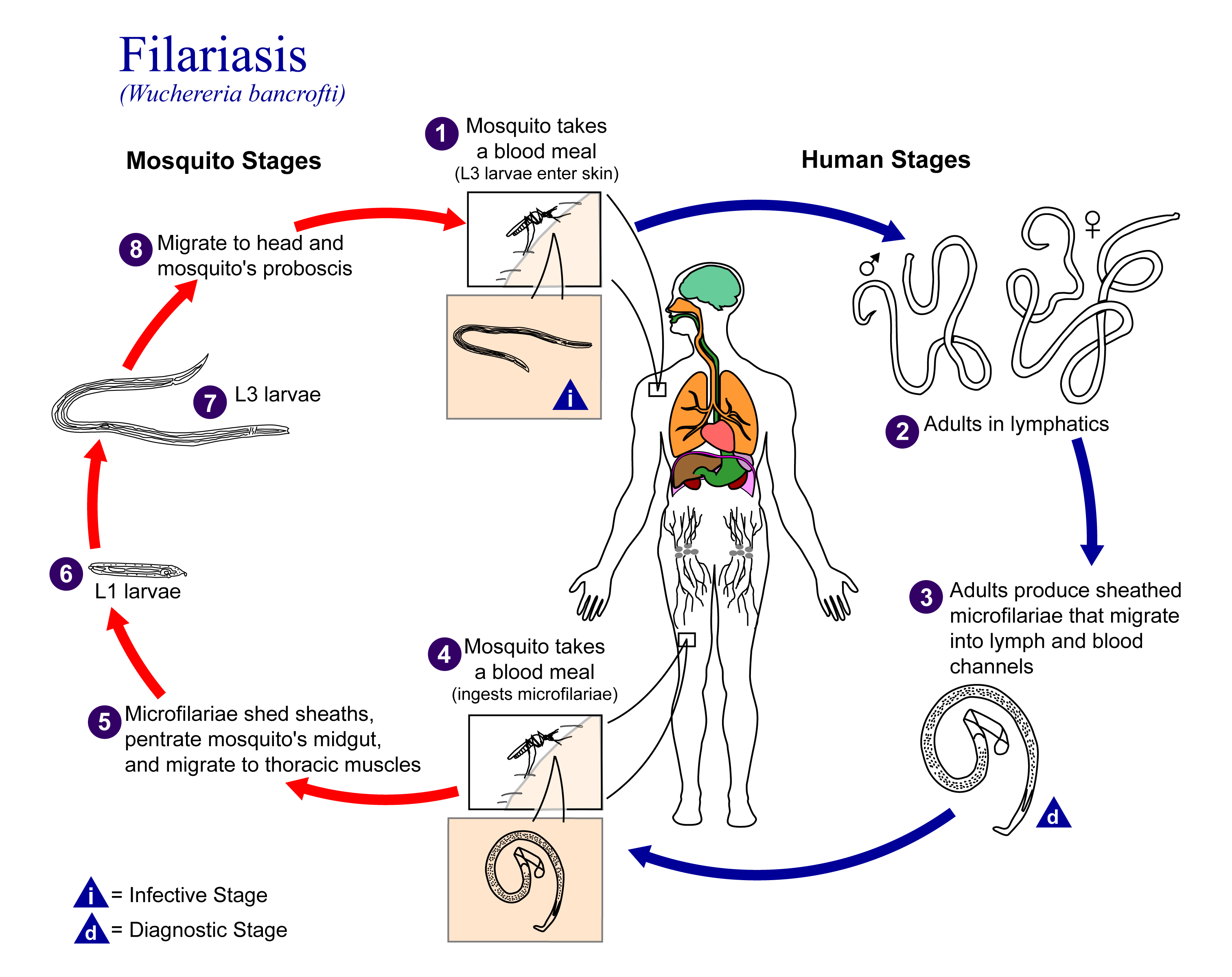
Life cycle of Wuchereria bancrofti, a parasite that causes lymphatic filariasis

- Filariasis
- Lymphatic system
