= Posterior scrotal nerves =

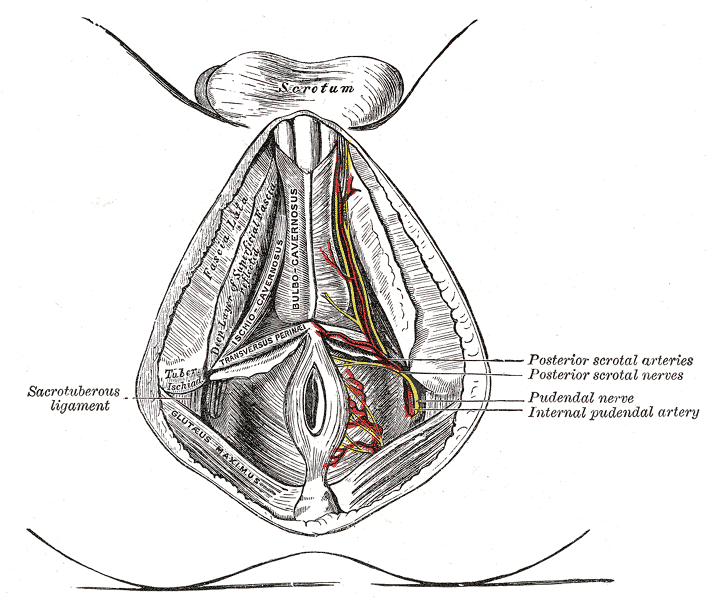
- The superficial branches of the internal pudendal artery. (Posterior scrotal nerves labeled at center right.)

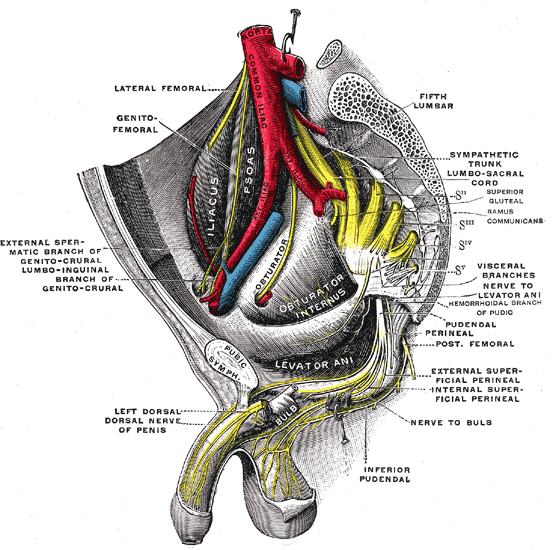
- Sacral plexus of the right side. (Posterior scrotal nerves not labeled, but visible at bottom right.)

Details
- From: Perineal nerve

Identifiers
- Latin: nervi scrotales posteriores
- TA98: A14.2.07.040M
- TA2: 6559
- FMA: 21867

The posterior scrotal branches are two in number, medial and lateral. They are branches of the perineal nerve, which is itself a branch of the pudendal nerve. The pudendal nerve arises from spinal roots S2 through S4, travels through the pudendal canal on the fascia of the obturator internus muscle, and gives off the perineal nerve in the perineum. The major branch of the perineal nerve is the posterior scrotal.

They pierce the fascia of the urogenital diaphragm, and run forward along the lateral part of the urethral triangle in company with the posterior scrotal branches of the perineal artery; they are distributed to the skin of the scrotum and communicate with the perineal branch of the posterior femoral cutaneous nerve.

== See also ==
- Posterior labial nerves
- Posterior labial veins
- Anterior scrotal nerves
- Posterior scrotal veins
