= Léon Dufourmentel =

French surgeon

Léon Dufourmentel (18 March 1884 – 29 July 1957) was a French surgeon, son of a merchant, who specialized in maxillofacial surgery, leading to reconstructive surgery. Intern of Hospitals of Paris, then leader of the clinical faculty of medicine of Paris. He was the son-in-law of the anatomist Pierre Sebileau, and the father of plastic surgeon Claude Dufourmentel (Former head of department at the Hôpital Saint-Louis).

During the First World War, he was responsible for caring for gueules cassées (broken faces), and being led to the creation of units of maxillofacial surgery, he found a method for repairing facial wounds: He described a pedicled vascularized flap from the temporal scalp (popularly called a Dufourmentel flap)(http://www.biusante.parisdescartes.fr/1418/cadre2e.htm) and transferred the tissue to the chin area. This tissue transfer was more reliable than a free skin graft. It was his idea to first use prosthetic inclusions prior to 1930 - then implants used were mostly made of ivory, rubber on the nose.

== Works and contributions ==
- La loi de Semon-Rosenbach dans les paralysies récurrentielles, 1914.
- La Chirurgie faciale aux Etats-Unis
- Chirurgie d'urgence des blessures de la face et du cou, 1918, avec le docteur Flavien Bonnet-Roy.
- Diagnostic, traitement et expertise des séquelles des blessures et des accidents des régions maxillo-faciales: traitements chirurgicaux, 1922, avec le docteur Léon Frison, publié par Baillière.
- Le rictus - journal humoristique médical - N°04, septembre 1924. Biographie du docteur Léon Dufourmentel par Portmann, biographie du docteur Georges Portmann (de Bordeaux) par L. Dufourmentel
- Chirurgie de l'articulation temporo-maxillaire, 1929.
- Chirurgie réparatrice et correctrice des téguments et des formes, 1939.
- Léon Dufourmentel. Introduction à la chirurgie constructive : Essai sur l'art et la chirurgie, 1946.
- Les complexes esthétiques et la chirurgie, 1957.
