= Inferior cluneal nerves =

- Cutaneous nerves of the right lower extremity. Front and posterior views.

Details
- From: Posterior cutaneous nerve of the thigh
- Innervates: Buttocks

Identifiers
- Latin: nervi clunium inferiores
- TA98: A14.2.07.034
- TA2: 6567
- FMA: 75470

The inferior clunial nerves (also gluteal branches of posterior femoral cutaneous nerve) are branches of the posterior cutaneous nerve of the thigh that innervate the skin of the lower part of the buttocks. They pass inferior to the inferior border of the gluteus maximus muscle.
