= Anterior scrotal arteries =

Details
- Source: Deep external pudendal artery
- Supplies: Scrotum

Identifiers
- Latin: rami scrotales anteriores arteriae pudendae externae profundae
- TA98: A12.2.16.015M
- TA2: 4680

The anterior scrotal arteries are branches of the deep external pudendal artery.

== Function ==
The anterior scrotal arteries supply part of the scrotum in men.

== See also ==
- Posterior scrotal arteries
