= Sebileau's muscle =

Deeper fibers of the musculus dartos

Sebileau's muscle is the deep muscle fibres of the dartos tunic which pass into the scrotal septum. It is named after French anatomist Pierre Sebileau (1860–1953).
