= Scrotum =

Sac of skin that protects the testicles

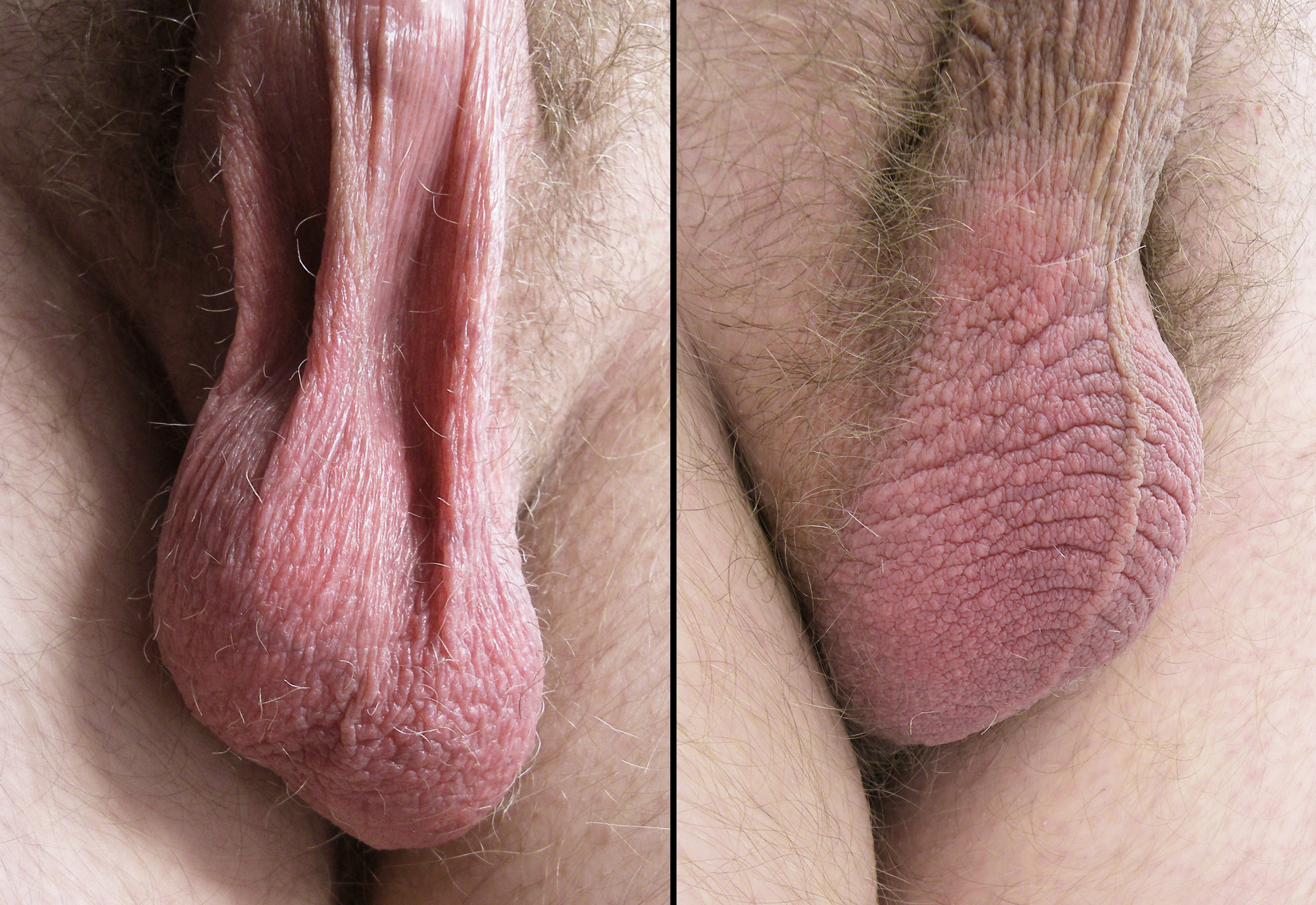
- A human's scrotum in a relaxed state (left) and a tense state (right)

Details
- Precursor: Labioscrotal swellings
- System: Reproductive system
- Artery: Anterior scrotal artery, posterior scrotal artery, deep external pudendal artery, superficial external pudendal artery, internal pudendal artery
- Vein: Posterior scrotal veins, internal pudendal veins
- Nerve: Posterior scrotal nerves, anterior scrotal nerves, genital branch of genitofemoral nerve, perineal branches of posterior femoral cutaneous nerve, pudendal nerve, perineal nerve
- Lymph: Superficial inguinal lymph nodes

Identifiers
- Latin: scrotum
- MeSH: D012611
- TA98: A09.4.03.001; A09.4.03.004
- TA2: 3693
- FMA: 18252

In most terrestrial mammals, the scrotum (pl.: scrotums or scrota; possibly from Latin scortum, meaning "hide" or "skin") or scrotal sac is a part of the external male genitalia located at the base of the penis. It consists of a sac of skin containing the external spermatic fascia, testicles, epididymides, and vasa deferentia. The scrotum will usually tighten when exposed to cold temperatures.

The scrotum is homologous to the labia majora in females.

== Structure ==
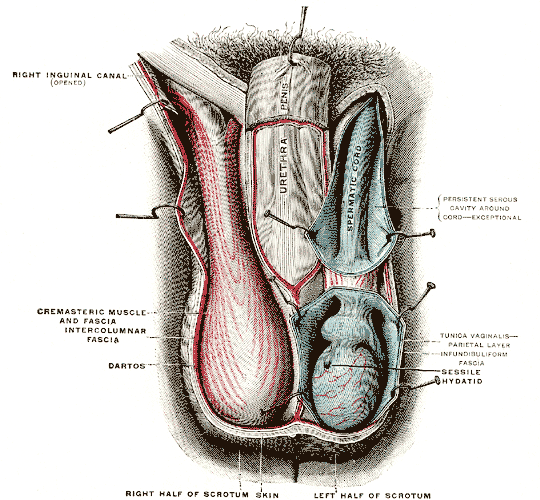
Diagram of the scrotum. On the left side, the cavity of the tunica vaginalis has been opened; on the right side, only the layers superficial to the cremaster muscle have been removed.

In regard to humans, the scrotum is a suspended two-chambered sac of skin and muscular tissue containing the testicles and the lower part of the spermatic cords. It is located behind the penis and above the perineum. The perineal raphe is a small, vertical ridge of skin that expands from the anus and runs through the middle of the scrotum front to back. The scrotum is also a distention of the perineum and carries some abdominal tissues into its cavity including the testicular artery, testicular vein, and pampiniform plexus.

=== Nerve supply ===
Nerve	Surface
Genital branch of genitofemoral nerve	anterolateral
Anterior scrotal nerves (from ilioinguinal nerve)	anterior
Posterior scrotal nerves (from perineal nerve)	posterior
Perineal branches of posterior femoral cutaneous nerve	inferior

=== Blood supply ===
Blood vessels	
Anterior scrotal artery	originates from the deep external pudendal artery
Posterior scrotal artery	
Testicular artery	

=== Skin and glands ===
- Sebaceous glands
- Apocrine glands
- Smooth muscle

The skin on the scrotum is more highly pigmented in comparison to the rest of the body. The septum is a connective tissue membrane dividing the scrotum into two cavities.

=== Lymphatic system ===
The scrotal lymph initially drains into the superficial inguinal lymph nodes, this then drains into the deep inguinal lymph nodes. The deep inguinal lymph nodes channel into the common iliac, which ultimately releases lymph into the cisterna chyli.

Lymphatic vessels
Superficial inguinal lymph nodes
Popliteal lymph nodes

=== Asymmetry ===
One testis is typically lower than the other, which is believed to function to avoid compression in the event of impact; in humans, the left testis is typically lower than the right. An alternative view is that testis descent asymmetry evolved to enable more effective cooling of the testicles.

=== Internal structure ===
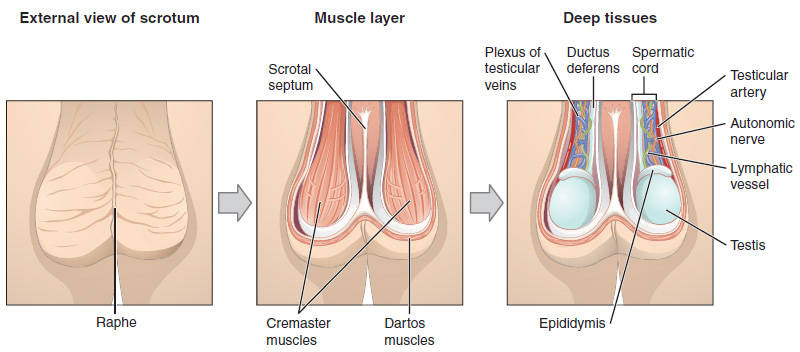
Image showing musculature and inner workings of the scrotum

Additional tissues and organs reside inside the scrotum and are described in more detail in the following articles:

- Appendix of epididymidis
- Cremaster muscle
- Dartos fascia
- Efferent ductules
- Epididymis
- Leydig cell
- Lobules of testis
- Paradidymis
- Rete testes
- Scrotal septum
- Seminiferous tubule
- Sertoli cell
- Spermatic cord
- Testicle
- Tunica albuginea of testis
- Tunica vaginalis
- Tunica vasculosa testis
- Vas deferens

== Development ==
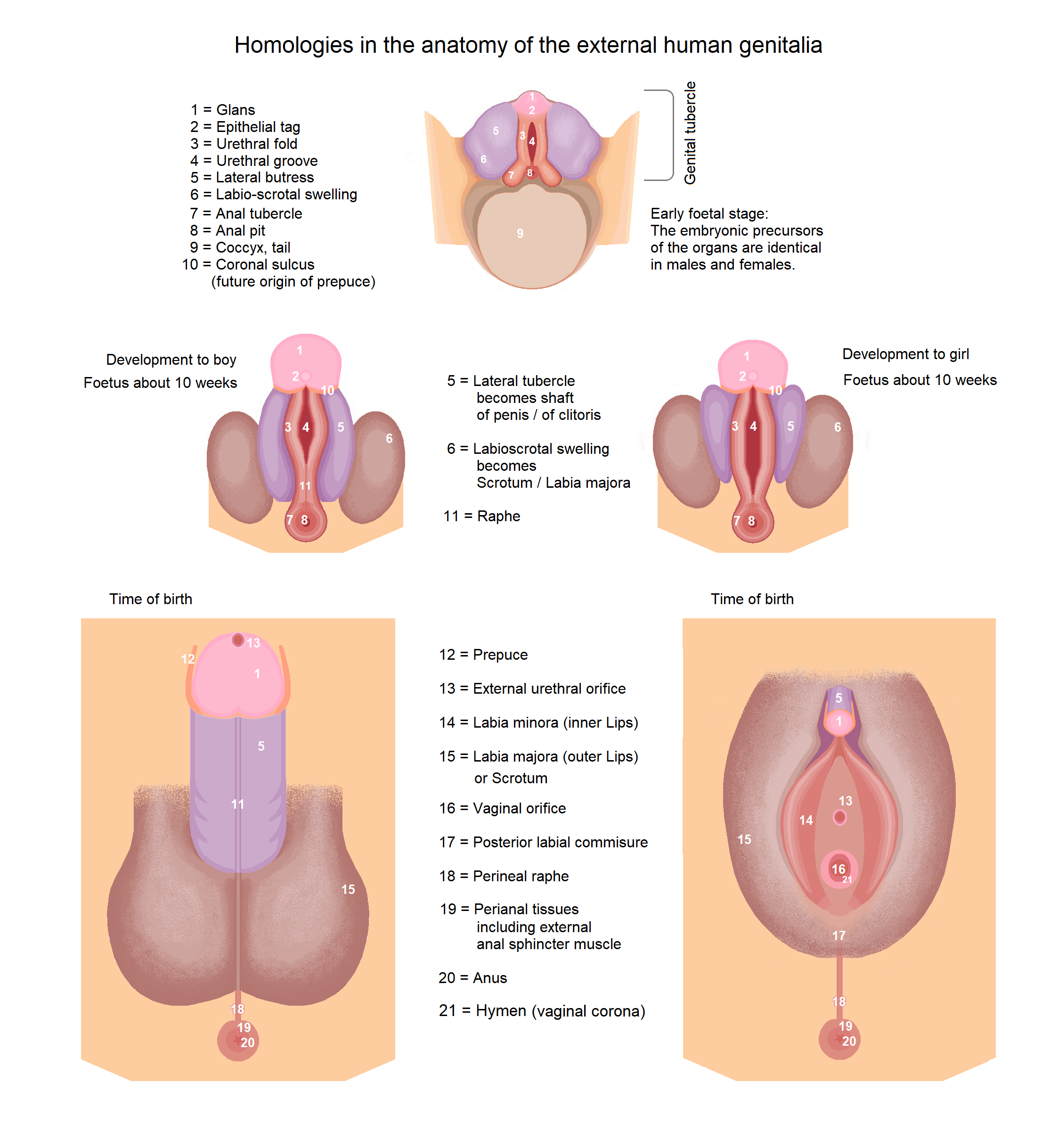
Development of external genitals showing homologues from indifferent to both sexes - male on left

During the fifth week after fertilization, the genital ridge grows behind the peritoneal membrane. By the sixth week, string-like tissues called primary sex cords form within the enlarging genital ridge. Externally, a swelling called the genital tubercule appears over the cloacal membrane.

Testosterone secretion starts during week eight, reaches peak levels during week 13 and eventually declines to very low levels by the end of the second trimester. The testosterone causes the masculinization of the labioscrotal folds into the scrotum. The scrotal raphe is formed when the embryonic, urethral groove closes by week 12.

=== Scrotal growth and puberty ===
Though the testes and scrotum form early in embryonic life, sexual maturation begins upon entering puberty. The increased secretion of testosterone causes the darkening of the skin and development of pubic hair on the scrotum.

== Function ==
The scrotum regulates the temperature of the testicles and maintains it at 35 degrees Celsius (95 degrees Fahrenheit), i.e. two or three degrees below the body temperature of 37 degrees Celsius (99 degrees Fahrenheit). Higher temperatures affect spermatogenesis. Temperature control is accomplished by the smooth muscles of the scrotum moving the testicles either closer to or further away from the abdomen dependent upon the ambient temperature. This is accomplished by the cremaster muscle in the abdomen and the dartos fascia (muscular tissue under the skin that makes the scrotum appear wrinkly).

During sexual arousal, the scrotum will also tighten and thicken in the course of penile erection.

Having the scrotum and testicles situated outside the abdominal cavity may provide additional advantages. The external scrotum is not affected by abdominal pressure. This may prevent the emptying of the testes before the sperm were matured sufficiently for fertilization. Another advantage is it protects the testes from jolts and compressions associated with an active lifestyle. The scrotum may provide some friction during intercourse, helping to enhance the activity. The scrotum is also considered to be an erogenous zone.

== Society and culture ==
Common slang terms for the scrotum are ballsack, nutsack, and teabag.

Some men will get a piercing on the skin of the scrotum, any of which is called a hafada (e.g., scrotal ladder). Side-to-side or front-to-back piercings that pass through the scrotum are known as transscrotal piercings.

Scrotoplasty is a sex reassignment surgery that creates a scrotum for trans men using tissue from the labia majora, or a plastic surgery that repairs or reconstructs the scrotum.

Cock and ball torture is a kink that may involve bringing pain to the scrotum. Beyond kink, a person (especially a man) may hit someone in the testicles as a gendered cultural practice known as sack tapping. This phenomenon is complex and contains many (often conflicting) meanings: it is used to both strengthen inclusive bonds and reinforce exclusive hierarchies, it is both humorous and violent, and both juvenile and present in male-dominated social spheres beyond those of adolescence.

== Other animals ==
A scrotum is a synapomorphy of boreoeutherians. The anus is separated from the scrotum by the perineum in these mammals. The testicles remain in the body cavity in all other vertebrates, including both the cloacal animals.

It has been secondarially lost in hippopotamuses, rhinoceroses, hedgehogs, moles, pangolins, tapirs, numerous families of bats and rodents, the whales and dolphins, and seals.

Some male marsupials have a scrotum that is anterior to the penis, which is not homologous to the scrotum of placentals, although there are several marsupial species without an external scrotum.

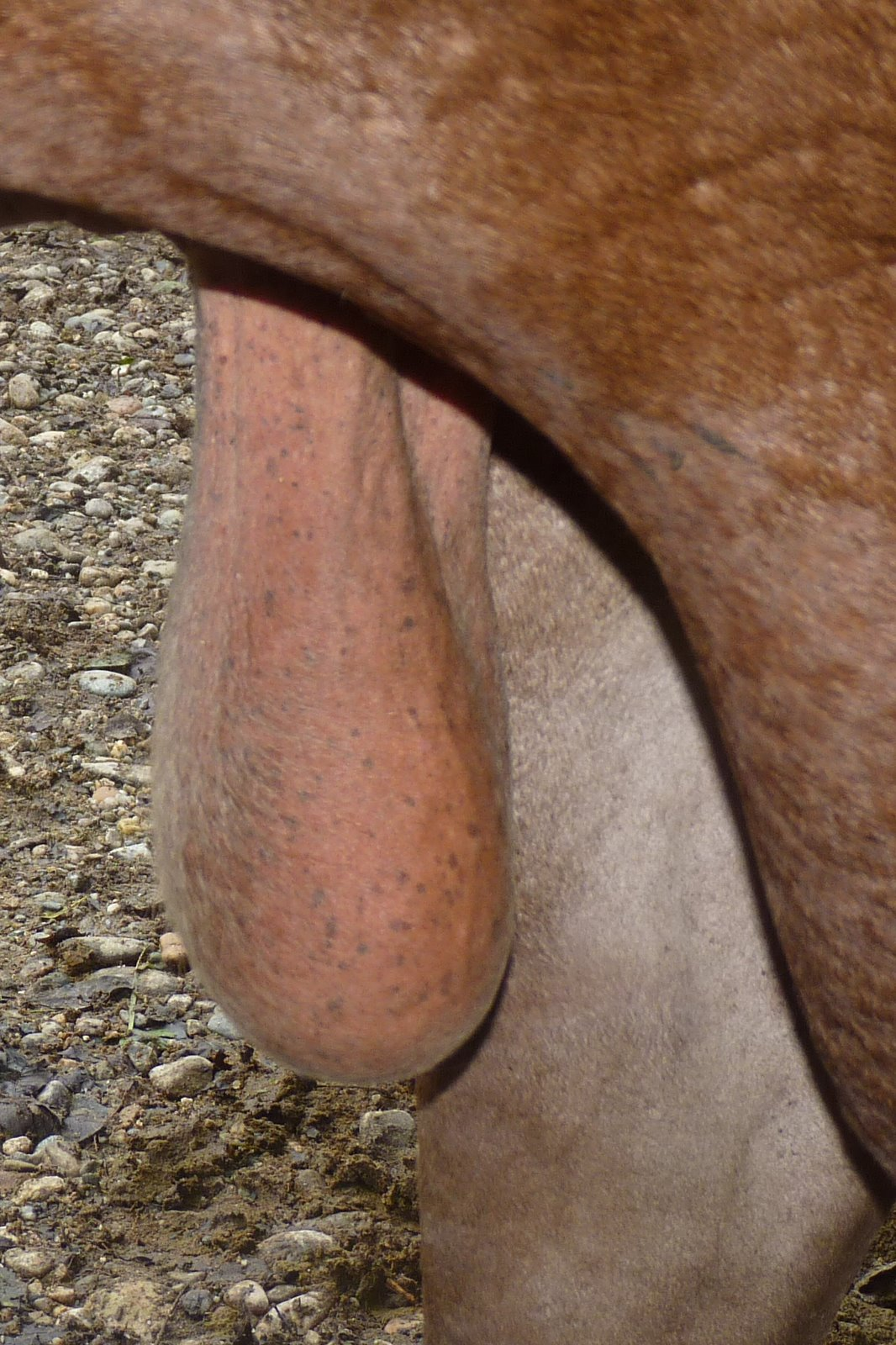
Scrotum of a bull

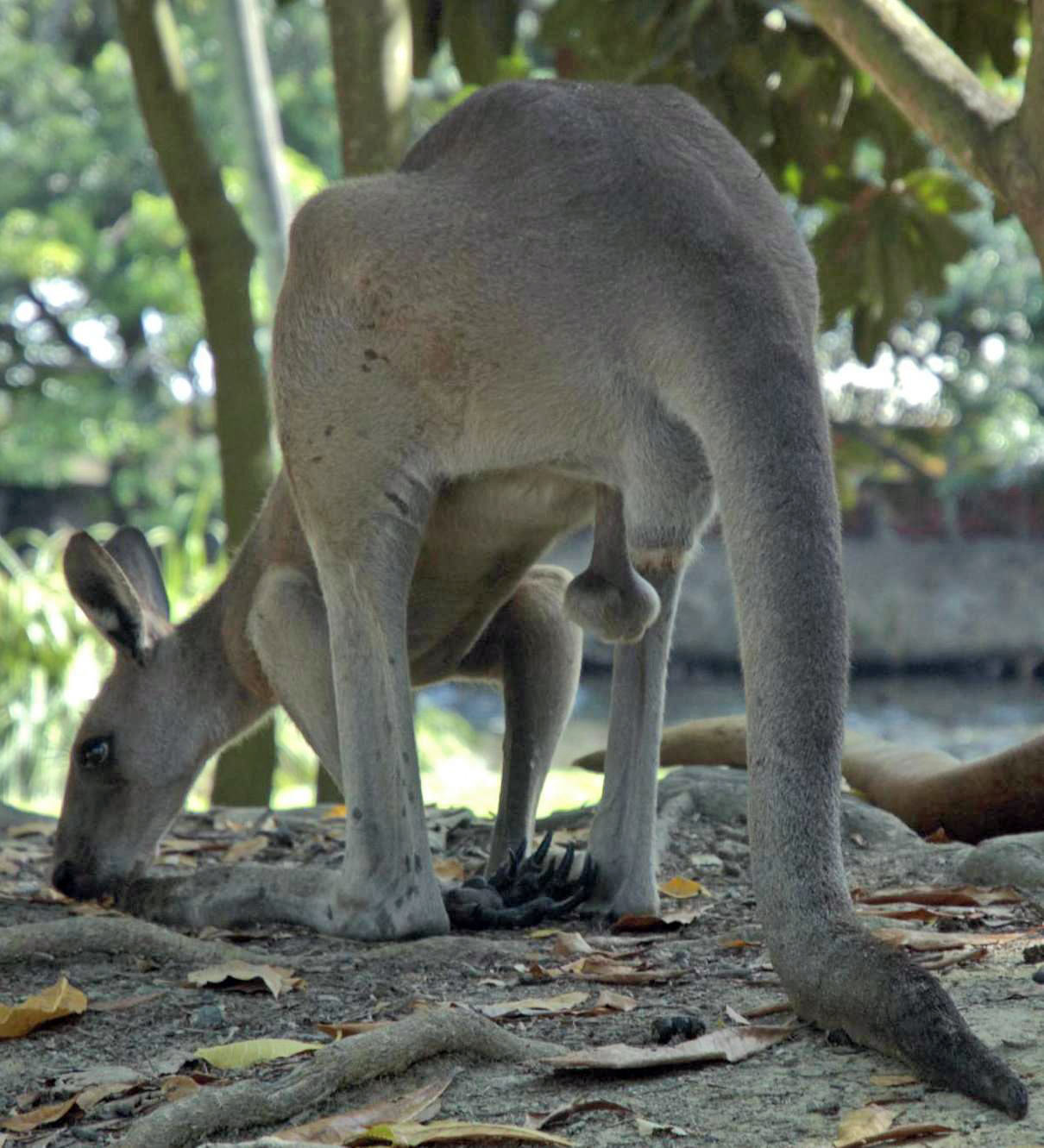
Scrotum of a kangaroo

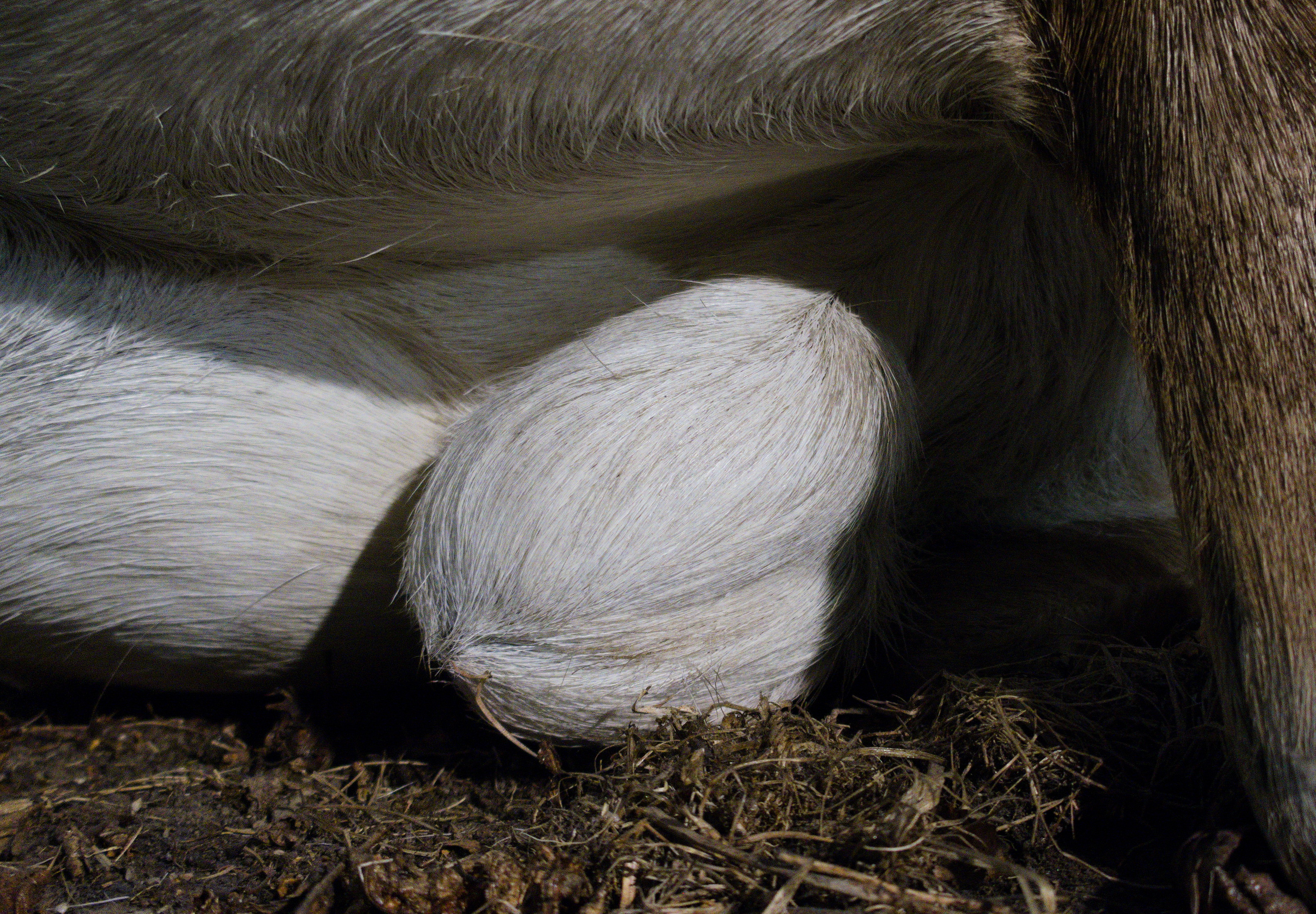
Scrotum of a red deer

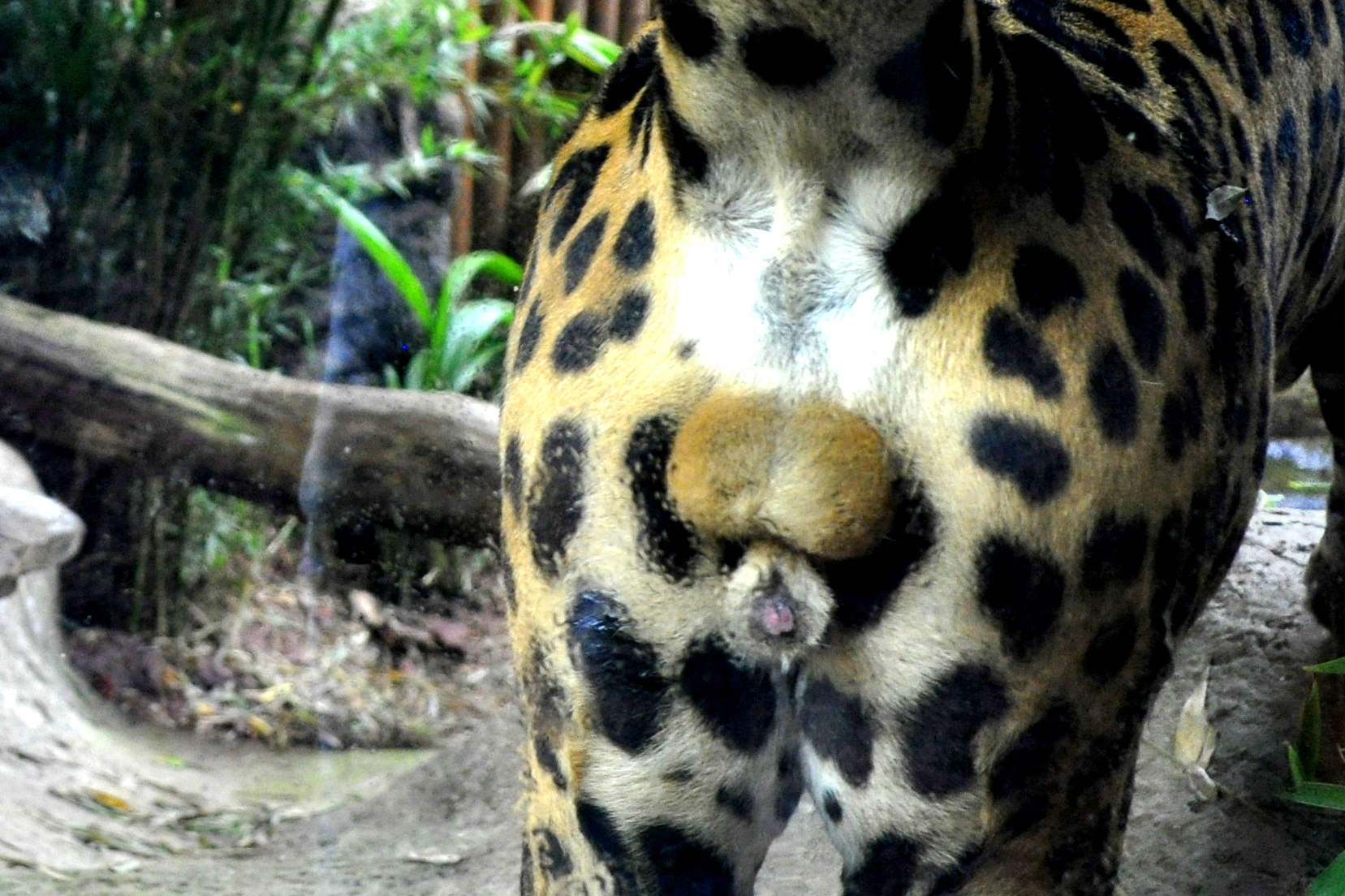
Scrotum of a jaguar

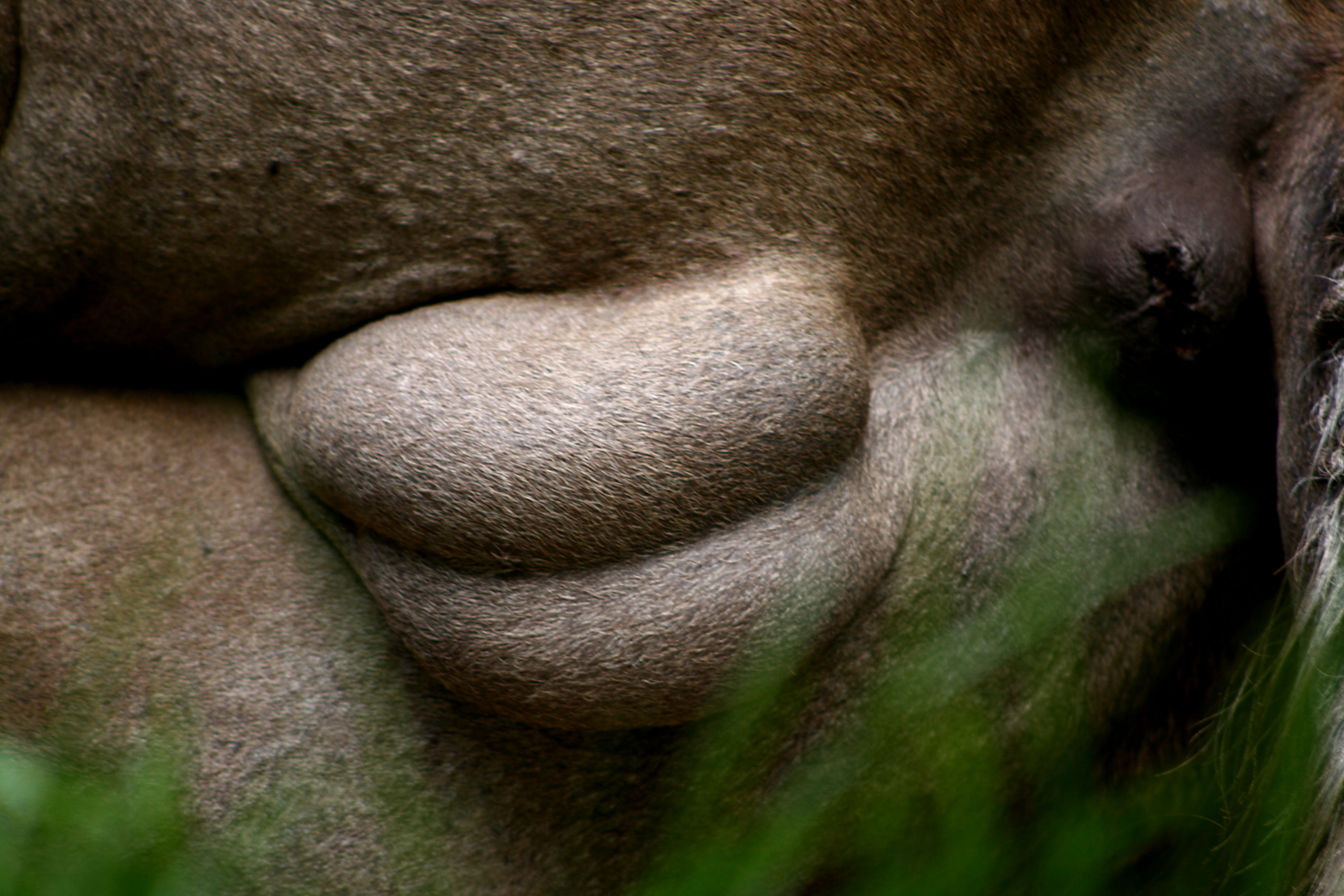
Scrotum of a camel

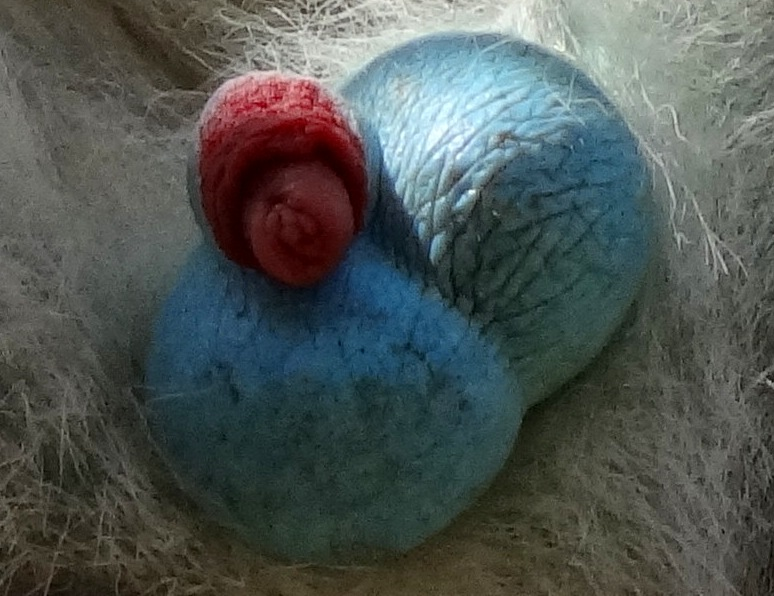
Scrotum of a vervet monkey

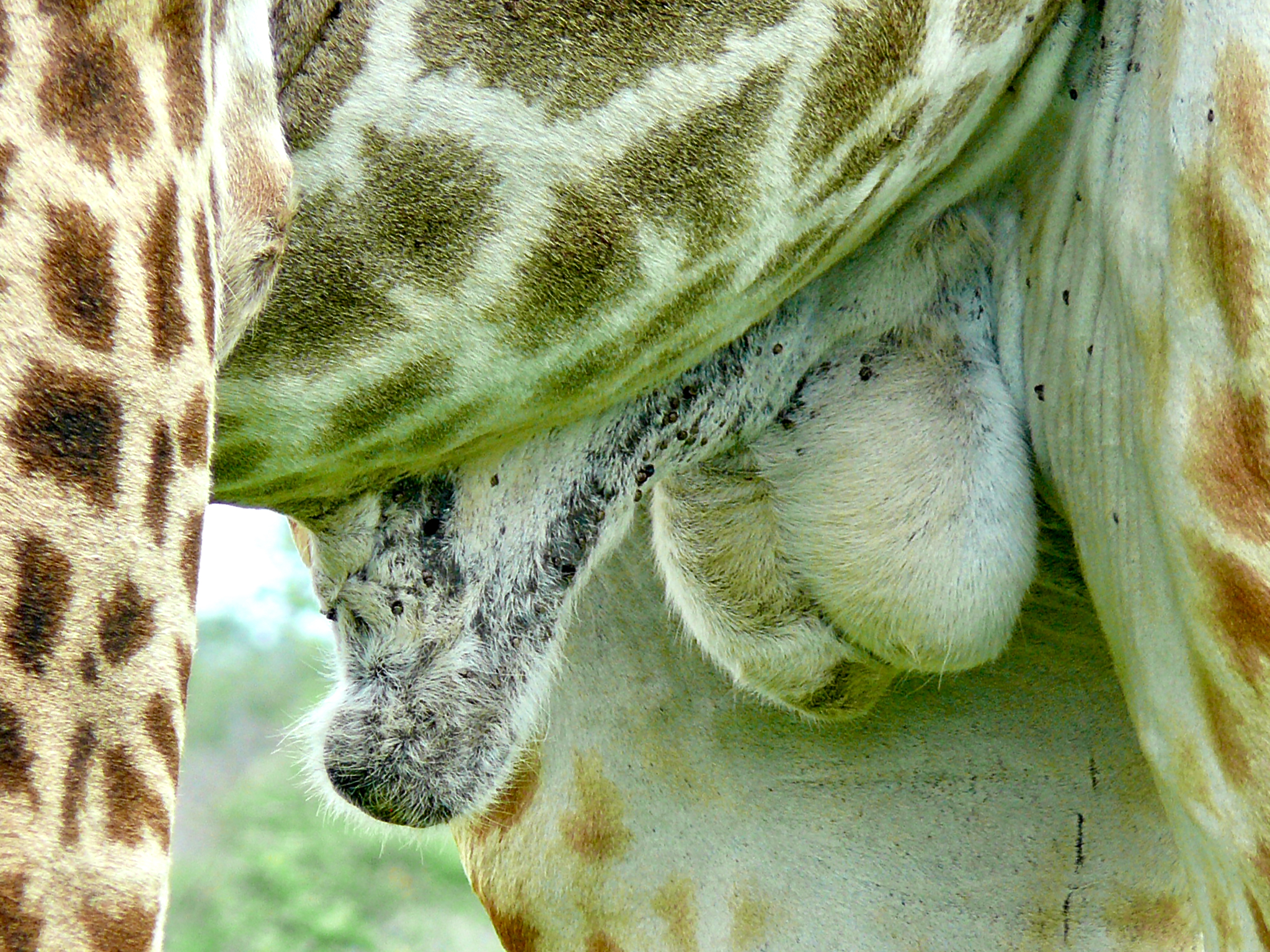
Scrotum of a giraffe

== Clinical significance ==
=== Diseases and conditions ===
The scrotum and its contents can develop many diseases and can incur injuries. These include:

- Candidiasis (yeast infection)
- Sebaceous cyst
- Epidermal cyst
- Hydrocele testis
- Hematocele
- Molluscum contagiosum
- Spermatocele
- Paget's disease of the scrotum
- Varicocele - enlargement of the pampiniform venous complex
- Inguinal hernia
- Epididymo-orchitis
- Testicular torsion
- Pruritus scroti - irritation of the scrotum (itchiness)
- Genital warts - sexually transmitted infection
- Testicular cancer
- Dermatitis
- Undescended testes (also known as cryptorchidism)
- Chyloderma - swollen scrotum caused by a lymphatic obstruction
- Mumps
- Scabies
- Herpes - sexually transmitted infection
- Pubic lice
- Chancroid (Haemophilus ducreyi) - sexually transmitted infection
- Chlamydia (Chlamydia trachomatis) - sexually transmitted infection
- Gonorrhea (Neisseria gonorrhoeae) - sexually transmitted infection
- Granuloma inguinale or (Klebsiella granulomatis)
- Syphilis (Treponema pallidum) - sexually transmitted infection
- Scrotal eczema
- Polyorchidism - the presence of three or more testicles
- Scrotal psoriasis disease
- Riboflavin deficiency
- Chimney sweeps' carcinoma (scrotal cancer)

== See also ==
- Retroperitoneal lymph node dissection
- Scrotal infusion, a temporary form of body modification
- Testicular self-examination

== Bibliography ==
Books

- Van De Graaff, Kent M.; Fox, Stuart Ira (1989). Concepts of Human Anatomy and Physiology. Dubuque, Iowa: William C. Brown Publishers. ISBN 978-0697056757.
- Elson, Lawrence; Kapit, Wynn (1977). The Anatomy Coloring Book. New York: Harper & Row. ISBN 978-0064539142.
- "Gross Anatomy Image". Medical Gross Anatomy Atlas Images. University of Michigan Medical School. 1997. Archived from the original on 2016-08-19.
- Berkow, Robert (1977). The Merck Manual of Medical Information; Home Edition. Whitehouse Station, New Jersey: Merck Research Laboratories. ISBN 978-0911910872.
