= Superficial external pudendal artery =

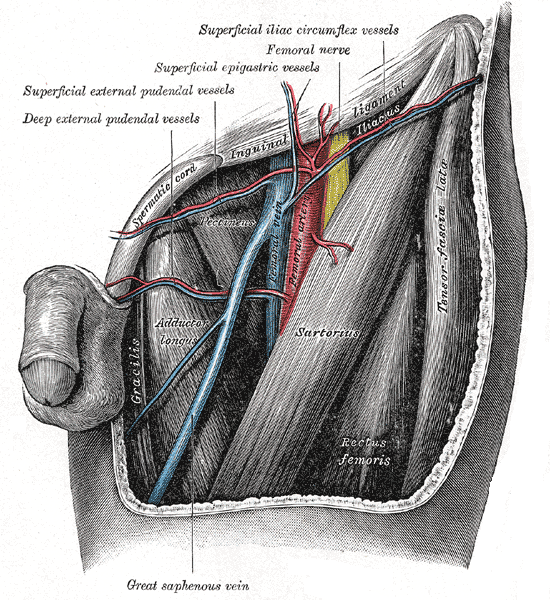
- The left femoral triangle. (Superficial external pudendal vessels labeled at upper left.)

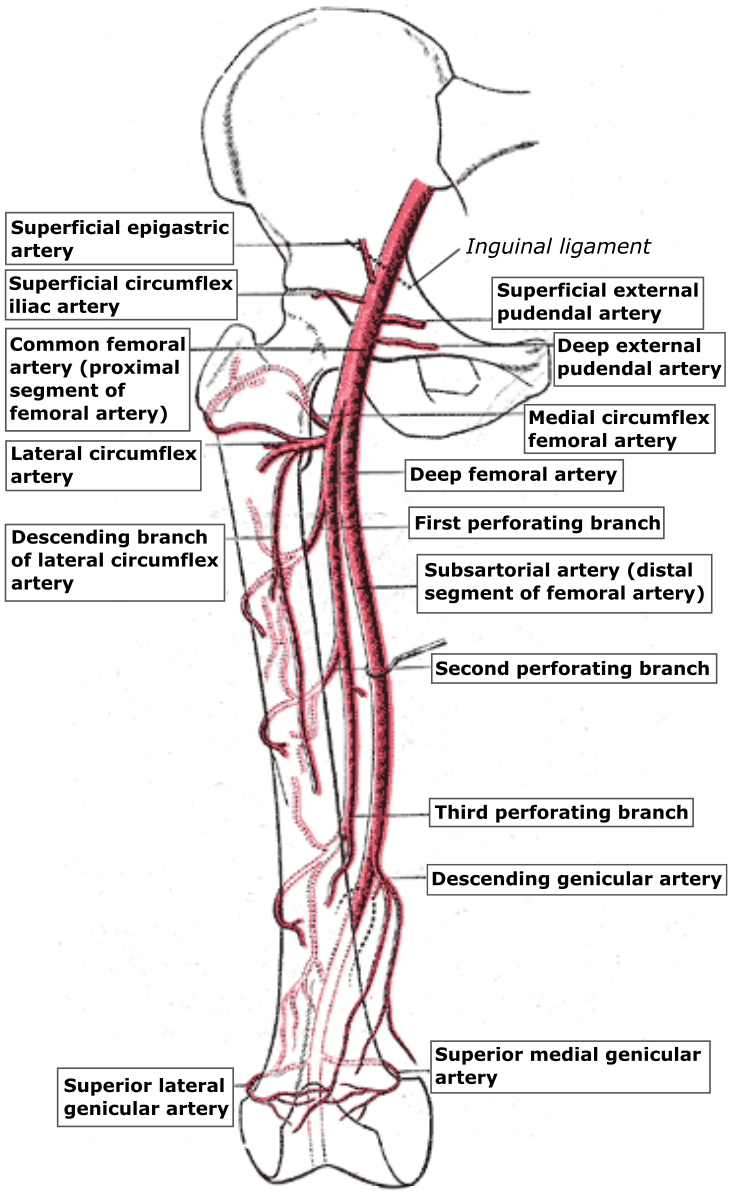
- Scheme of the femoral artery. (Superficial external pudendal artery labeled at upper right.)

Details
- Source: Femoral artery
- Vein: External pudendal vein

Identifiers
- Latin: arteria pudenda externa superficialis
- TA98: A12.2.16.013
- TA2: 4677
- FMA: 20738

The superficial external pudendal artery (superficial external pudic artery) is one of the three pudendal arteries. It arises from the medial side of the femoral artery, close to the superficial epigastric artery and superficial iliac circumflex artery.

== Course and target ==
After piercing the femoral sheath and fascia cribrosa, it courses medialward, across the spermatic cord (or round ligament in the female), to be distributed to the integument on the lower part of the abdomen, the scrotum in the male, and the labium majus in the female, anastomosing with branches of the internal pudendal artery. It crosses superficial to the inguinal ligament.

== See also ==
- Deep external pudendal artery
- Internal pudendal artery

== Additional images ==
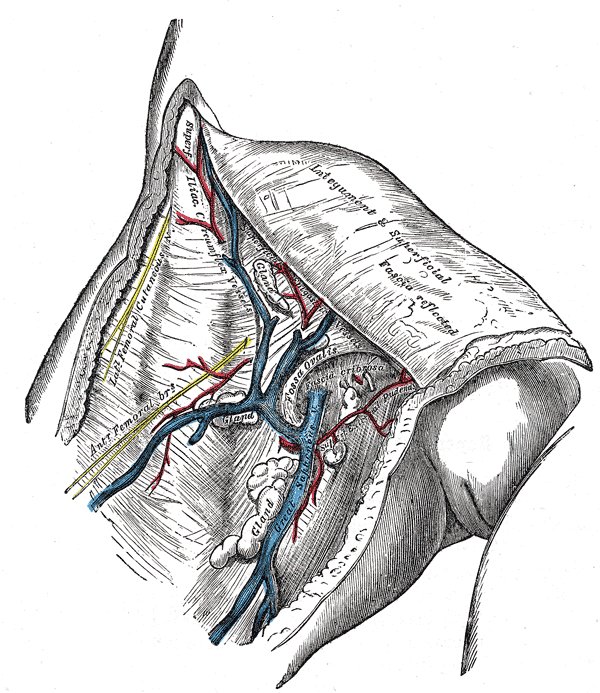
The great saphenous vein and its tributaries at the fossa ovalis.

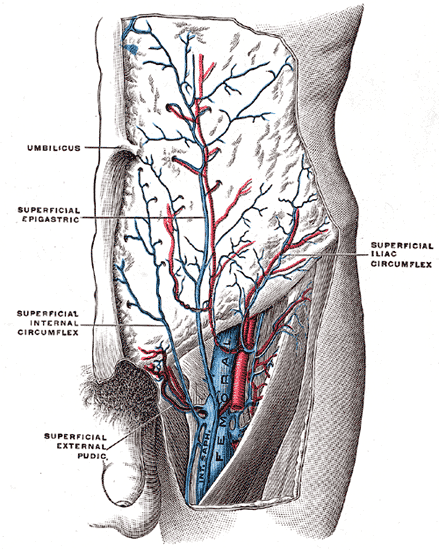
The femoral vein and its tributaries.

Schema of the arteries arising from the external iliac and femoral arteries.

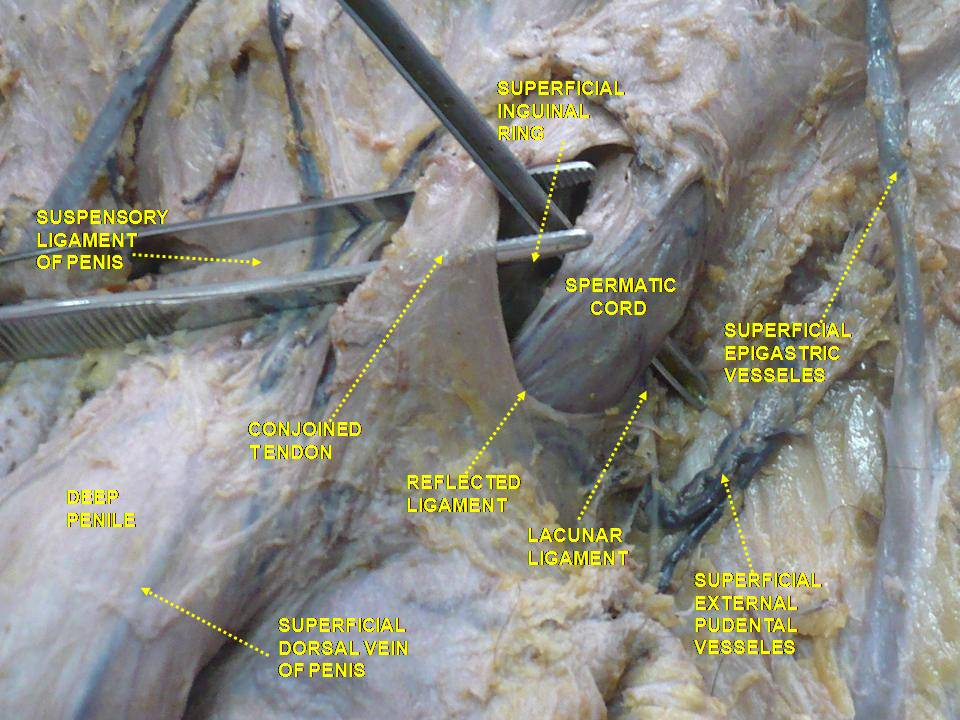
Anterior abdominal wall. Intermediate dissection. Anterior view
