= Posterior cutaneous nerve of thigh =

Sensory nerve that supplies the back of the thigh, leg, buttock, and perineum

- Cross-section through the middle of the thigh. (Posterior femoral cutaneous nerve labeled at bottom.)

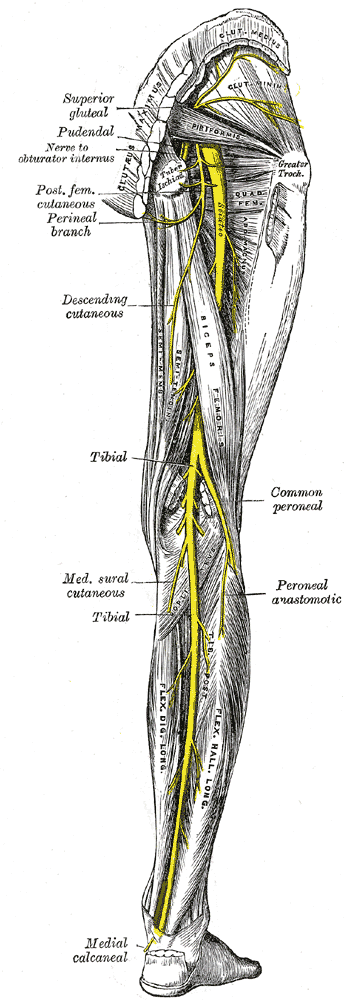
- Nerves of the right lower extremity. Posterior view. (Post. fem. cutaneus labeled at upper left.)

Details
- From: Sacral plexus (S1, S2, S3)
- To: Inferior clunial nerves, perineal branches

Identifiers
- Latin: nervus cutaneus femoris posterior
- TA98: A14.2.07.033
- TA2: 6566
- FMA: 45337

The posterior cutaneous nerve of the thigh (also called the posterior femoral cutaneous nerve) is a sensory nerve of the thigh. It is a branch of the sacral plexus. It supplies the skin of the posterior surface of the thigh, leg, buttock, and also the perineum.

Unlike most nerves termed "cutaneous" which are subcutaneous, only the terminal branches of this nerve pass into subcutaneous tissue before being distributed to the skin, with most of the nerve itself situated deep to the deep fascia.

== Structure ==
=== Origin ===
The posterior cutaneous nerve of the thigh is a branch of the sacral plexus. It arises from the posterior divisions of the S1–S2, and the anterior divisions of S2–S3 sacral spinal nerves.

=== Course ===
It leaves the pelvis through the greater sciatic foramen inferior to the piriformis muscle. It then descends deep to the gluteus maximus muscle, medial or posterior to the sciatic nerve, and alongside the inferior gluteal artery. It descends within the posterior thigh deep to the fascia lata (the deep fascia of the thigh) and superficial to the hamstring muscles. It runs over the long head of the biceps femoris to the back of the knee. It pierces the fascia lata posterior to the knee. It then accompanies the small saphenous vein to about the middle of the posterior leg (i.e. lower leg). Its terminal branches communicate with the sural nerve.

=== Branches ===
Its branches are all cutaneous, and are distributed to the gluteal region, the perineum, and the back of the thigh and leg.

- The inferior clunial nerves (or gluteal branches), three or four in number, turn upward around the lower border of the gluteus maximus, and supply the skin covering the lower and lateral part of that muscle.
- The perineal branches are distributed to the skin at the upper and medial side of the thigh.
- The main part to the back of the thigh and leg consists of numerous filaments derived from both sides of the nerve, and distributed to the skin covering the back and medial side of the thigh, the popliteal fossa, and the upper part of the back of the leg.

=== Distribution ===
The posterior cutaneous nerve of the thigh provides sensory innervation to most of the posterior surface of the thigh (upper leg), and the superior part of the posterior surface of the leg (lower leg), as well as (the inferior part of) the gluteal region (via inferior cluneal nerves, derived from anterior rami of S1-S2), and the perineum (via the perineal branch).

== Clinical significance ==
The posterior cutaneous nerve of the thigh may be involved in pain in the posterior thigh.

== Additional images ==
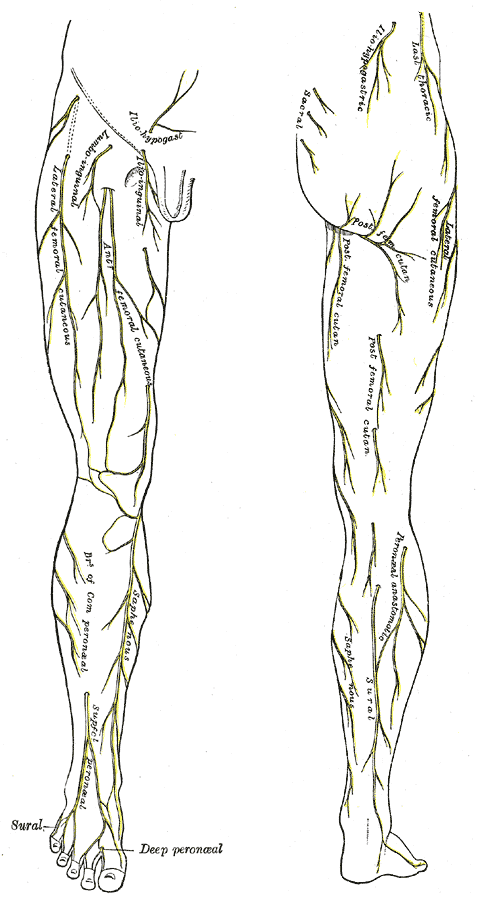
Cutaneous nerves of the right lower extremity. Front and posterior views.

Cutaneous nerves of the right lower extremity. Front and posterior views.

Schematic of sacral plexus. Posterior cutaneous nerve of thigh is labeled at the bottom.
