= Deep external pudendal artery =

One of the pudendal arteries in human anatomy

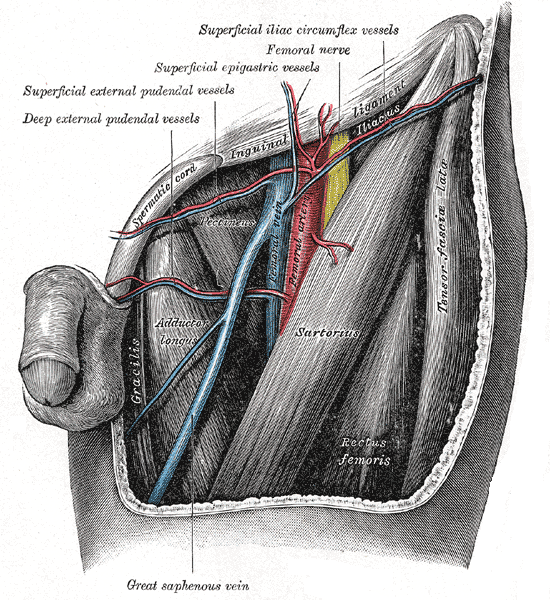
- The left femoral triangle. (Deep external pudendal vessels labeled at upper left.)

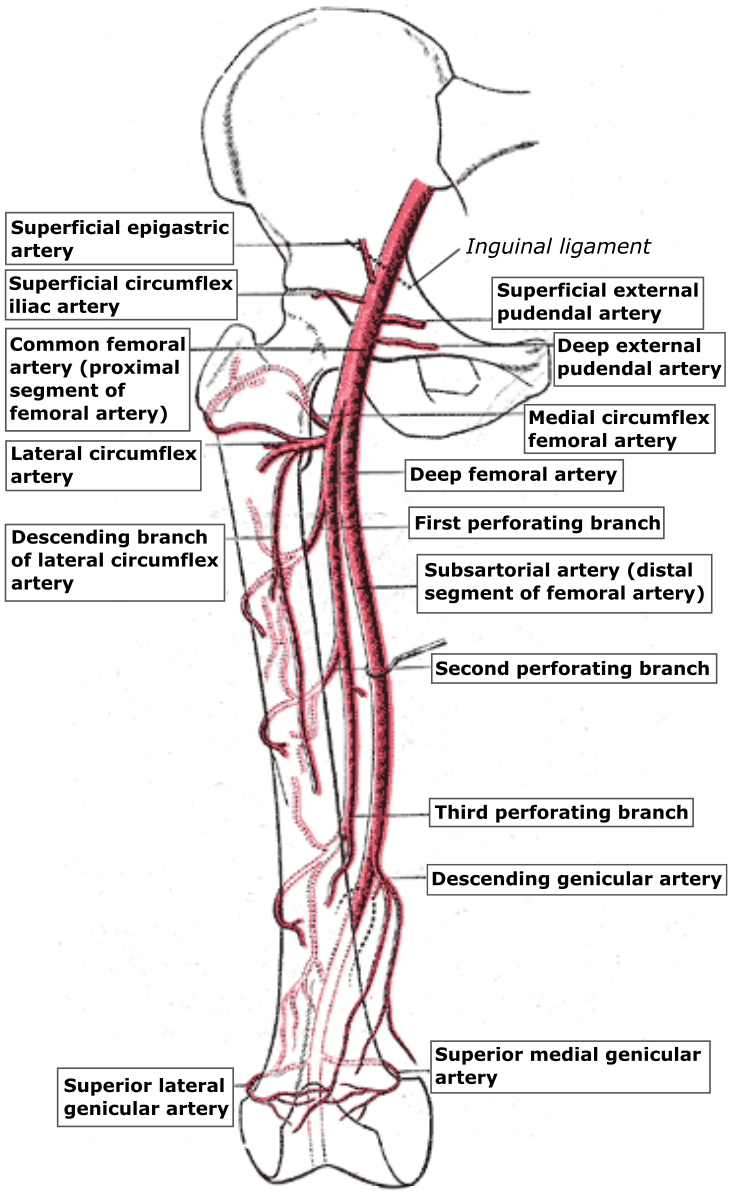
- Scheme of the femoral artery with segments and branches (deep external pudendal artery labeled at upper right)

Details
- Source: Femoral artery
- Vein: External pudendal vein

Identifiers
- Latin: arteria pudenda externa profunda
- TA98: A12.2.16.014
- TA2: 4678
- FMA: 20739

The deep external pudendal artery (deep external pudic artery) is one of the pudendal arteries that is more deeply seated than the superficial external pudendal artery, passes medially across the pectineus and the adductor longus muscles; it is covered by the fascia lata, which it pierces at the medial side of the thigh, and is distributed, in the male, to the integument of the scrotum and perineum, in the female to the labia majora; its branches anastomose with the scrotal or labial branches of the perineal artery.

== Additional images ==
Schema of the arteries arising from the external iliac and femoral arteries

== See also ==
- Internal pudendal artery
