= Sex organ =

Biological part involved in sexual reproduction

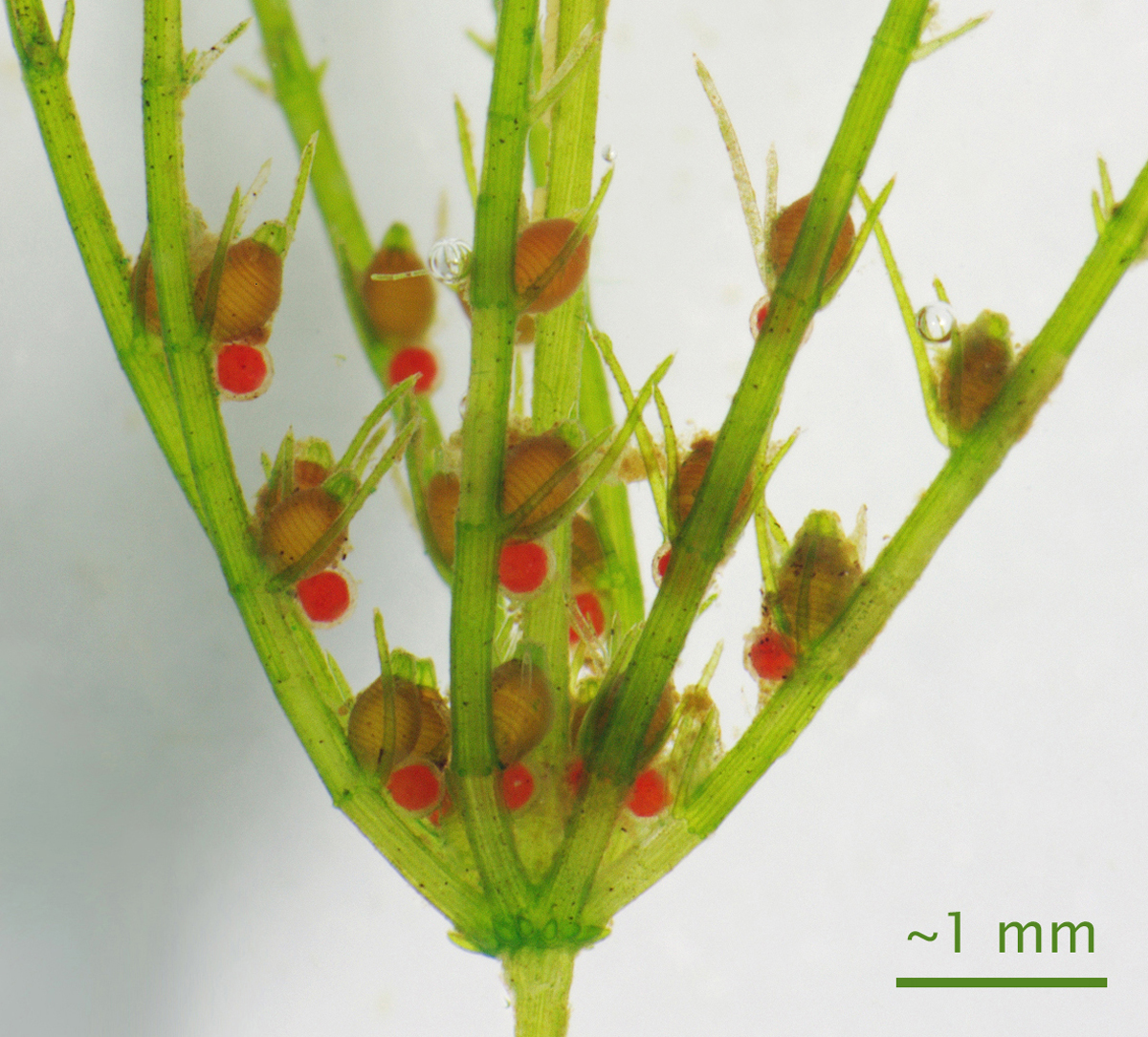
The sex organs of the green algae Chara are the male antheridia (red) and female archegonia (brown).

A sex organ, also known as a reproductive organ, is a part of an organism that is involved in sexual reproduction. Sex organs constitute the primary sex characteristics of an organism. Sex organs are responsible for producing and transporting gametes, as well as facilitating fertilization and supporting the development and birth of offspring. Sex organs are found in many species of animals and plants, with their features varying depending on the species. The sex organs constitute the organism's reproductive system.

In humans and other mammals the sex organs are typically differentiated into male and female types. The primary sex organs are the ovaries in females, and the testicles in males. Secondary sex organs include the clitoris, oviducts (fallopian tubes), and vagina in females, and in males the epididymides, and penis. The outer parts are known as the genitals or external genitalia, visible at birth in both sexes, while the inner parts that are always hidden are referred to as internal genitalia.

In plants, male reproductive structures include stamens in flowering plants, which produce pollen. Female reproductive structures, such as pistils in flowering plants, produce ovules and receive pollen for fertilization. Mosses, ferns, and some similar plants have gametangia for reproductive organs, which are part of the gametophyte. The flowers of flowering plants produce pollen and egg cells, but the sex organs themselves are inside the gametophytes within the pollen and the ovule. Coniferous plants likewise produce their sexually reproductive structures within the gametophytes contained within the cones and pollen. The cones and pollen are not themselves sexual organs.

== Terminology ==
The primary sex organs are the gonads, a pair of internal sex organs, which diverge into testicles following male development or into ovaries following female development. As primary sex organs, gonads generate reproductive gametes containing inheritable DNA. They also produce most of the primary hormones that affect sexual development, and regulate other sexual organs and sexually differentiated behaviors.

Secondary sex organs are the rest of the reproductive system, whether internal or external. The Latin term genitalia, sometimes anglicized as genitals, is used to describe the externally visible sex organs.

In general zoology, given the great variety in organs, physiologies, and behaviors involved in copulation, male genitalia are more strictly defined as "all male structures that are inserted in the female or that hold her near her gonopore during sperm transfer"; female genitalia are defined as "those parts of the female reproductive tract that make direct contact with male genitalia or male products (sperm, spermatophores) during or immediately after copulation".

== Evolution ==
It is hard to find a common origin for gonads. However, gonads most likely evolved independently several times. At first, testes and ovaries evolved due to natural selection.

A consensus has emerged that sexual selection represents a primary factor for genital evolution. Male genitalia show traits of divergent evolution that are driven by sexual selection.

== Animals ==
=== Vertebrates ===
==== Mammals ====
The visible portion of eutherian mammalian genitals for males consists of the penis and scrotum; for females, it consists of the vulva.

Male placental mammals urinate and ejaculate through one urethral opening in the penis, while females have two separate vaginal and urethral openings. Male and female genitals have many nerve endings, resulting in pleasurable and highly sensitive touch. In most human societies, particularly in conservative ones, exposure of the genitals is considered a public indecency.

In humans, sex organs include:

Male	Female
External: Penis; Foreskin; Shaft; Glans; Scrotum; Internal: Prostate; Bulbourethral glands; Epididymides; Vasa deferentia; Testicles; Seminal vesicles; Human male external sex organs (shaved pubic hair)	External: Vulva; Clitoris; Glans; Body; Hood; Labia majora; Labia minora; Vestibule; Internal: Fallopian tubes; Ovaries; Uterus; Cervix; Vagina; Bartholin's glands; Skene's glands; Human female external sex organs (shaved pubic hair)

===== Development =====
In typical prenatal development, sex organs originate from a common primordium during early gestation and differentiate into male or female sexes. The SRY gene, usually located on the Y chromosome and encoding the testis determining factor, determines the direction of the differentiation. The absence of it allows the gonads to continue to develop into ovaries.

The development of the internal and external reproductive organs is determined by hormones produced by certain fetal gonads (ovaries or testicles) and the cells' response to them. The initial appearance of the fetal genitalia looks female-like: a pair of urogenital folds with a small protuberance in the middle, and the urethra behind the protuberance. If the fetus has testes and the testes produce testosterone, and if the cells of the genitals respond to the testosterone, the outer urogenital folds swell and fuse in the midline to produce the scrotum; the protuberance grows larger and straighter to form the penis; the inner urogenital swellings grow, wrap around the penis, and fuse in the midline to form the penile raphe. Each organ/body part in one sex has a homologous counterpart.

The process of sexual differentiation includes the development of secondary sexual characteristics, such as patterns of pubic and facial hair and female breasts that emerge at puberty.

Because of the strong sexual selection affecting the structure and function of genitalia, they form an organ system that evolves rapidly. A great variety of genital form and function may therefore be found among animals.

==== Other animals ====
In many other vertebrates, a single posterior orifice (the cloaca) serves as the only opening for the reproductive, digestive, and urinary tracts (if present) in both sexes. All amphibians, birds, reptiles, some fish, and a few mammals (monotremes, tenrecs, golden moles, and marsupial moles) have this orifice, from which they excrete both urine and feces in addition to serving reproductive functions. Excretory systems with analogous purpose in certain invertebrates are also sometimes referred to as cloacae.

Penile and clitoral structures are present in some birds and many reptiles.

Sexing teleost fish is determined by the shape of a fleshy tube behind the anus known as genital papilla.

=== Invertebrates ===
==== Insects ====
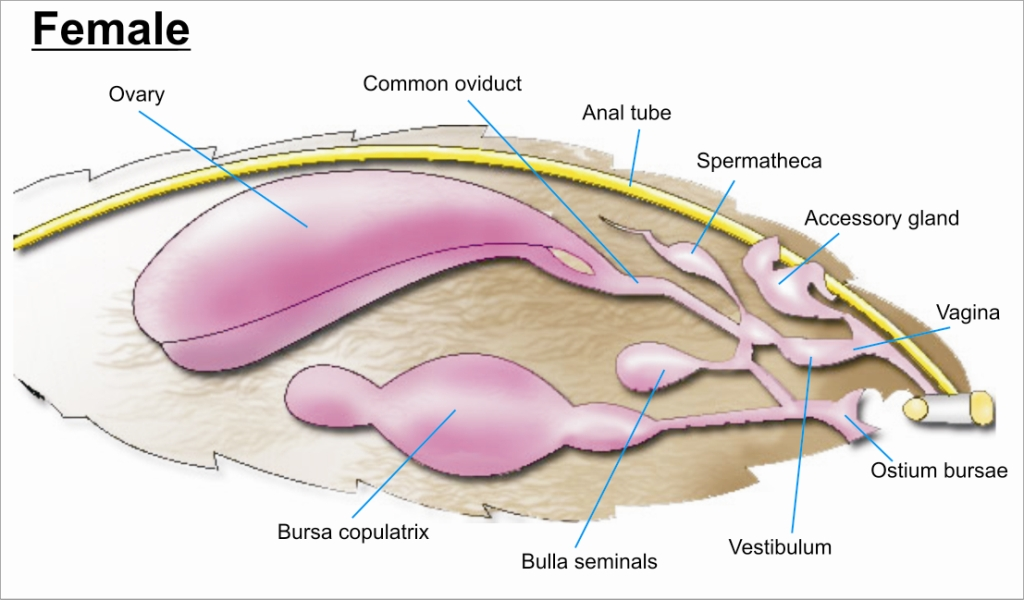
The female genitalia of Lepidoptera

The organs concerned with insect mating and the deposition of eggs are known collectively as the external genitalia, although they may be largely internal; their components are very diverse in form.

==== Slugs and snails ====
The reproductive system of gastropods (slugs and snails) varies greatly from one group to another.

==== Planaria ====
Planaria are flat worms widely used in biological research. There are sexual and asexual planaria. Sexual planaria are hermaphrodites, possessing both testicles and ovaries. Each planarian transports its excretion to the other planarian, giving and receiving sperm.

== Plants ==
In most plant species, an individual has both male and female sex organs (a hermaphrodite).

The life cycle of land plants involves alternation of generations between a sporophyte and a haploid gametophyte. The gametophyte produces sperm or egg cells by mitosis. The sporophyte produces spores by meiosis, which in turn develop into gametophytes. Any sex organs that are produced by the plant will develop on the gametophyte. The seed plants, which include conifers and flowering plants, have small gametophytes that develop inside the pollen grains (male) and the ovule (female).

=== Flowers ===
In flowering plants, the flowers contain the sex organs.

Sexual reproduction in flowering plants involves the union of the male and female germ cells, sperm and egg cells respectively. Pollen is produced in stamens and is carried to the pistil or carpel, which has the ovule at its base where fertilization can take place. Within each pollen grain is a male gametophyte, which consists of only three cells. In most flowering plants, the female gametophyte within the ovule consists of only seven cells. Thus there are no sex organs as such.

== Fungi ==
The sex organs in fungi are known as gametangia. In some fungi, the organs are indistinguishable from each other but, in other cases, male and female sex organs are clearly different.

Similar gametangia that are similar are known as isogametangia. While male and female gametangia are known as heterogametangia, which occurs in the majority of fungi.

== See also ==
- Andrology
- Emasculation
- Genital modification and mutilation
- Human sexuality
- Hysterectomy
- Intimate part
- Obstetrics and gynaecology
- Oophorectomy
- Orchiectomy
