= Perineal raphe =

Human body part

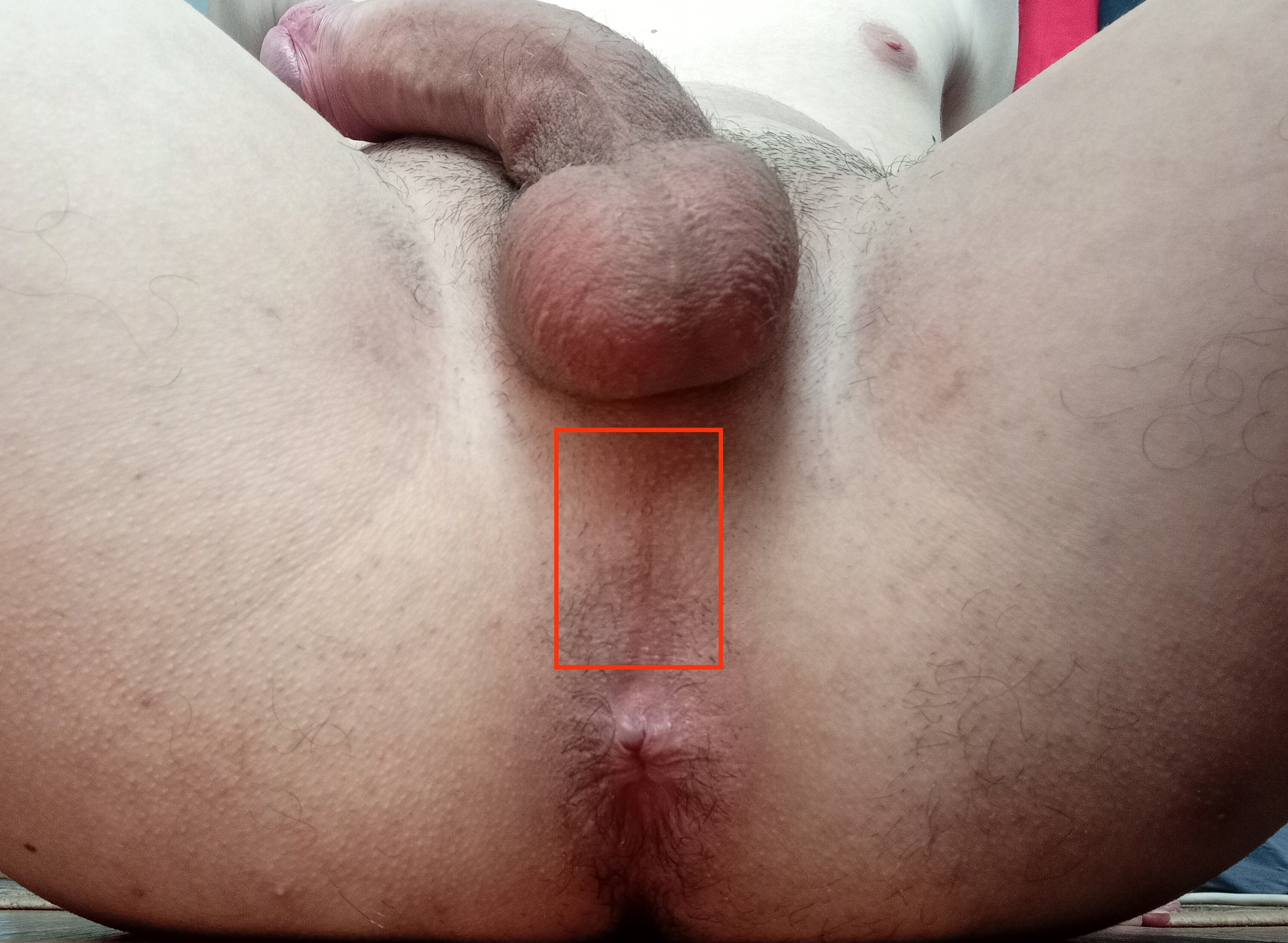
- Male perineal raphe

Details
- Precursor: Urogenital folds

Identifiers
- Latin: raphe perinei
- TA98: A09.5.00.002; A09.4.01.013; A09.4.03.002
- TA2: 3698
- FMA: 20244

The perineal raphe (/ˈreɪfi/ RAY-fee) is a visible line or ridge of tissue on the body that extends from the anus through the perineum to the scrotum (male) or the vulva (female). It is found in both males and females, arises from the fusion of the urogenital folds, and is visible running medial through anteroposterior, to the anus where it resolves in a small knot of skin of varying size.

In males, this structure continues through the midline of the scrotum (the so-called scrotal raphe or Vesling line) and upwards through the posterior midline aspect of the penis (penile raphe). It also exists deeper through the scrotum where it is called the scrotal septum. It is the result of a fetal developmental phenomenon whereby the scrotum and penis close toward the midline and fuse.

In females, the raphe consists in most cases of normal skin and is clearly visible. In around 10% of the population the raphe is present as a ridge of skin; in around 25% of the population the raphe has rough patches of skin or diagonal ridges on one or both sides of the midline.

== See also ==
- Embryonic and prenatal development of the male reproductive system in humans
- Frenulum of penis
- Linea nigra
- Raphe

== Images ==
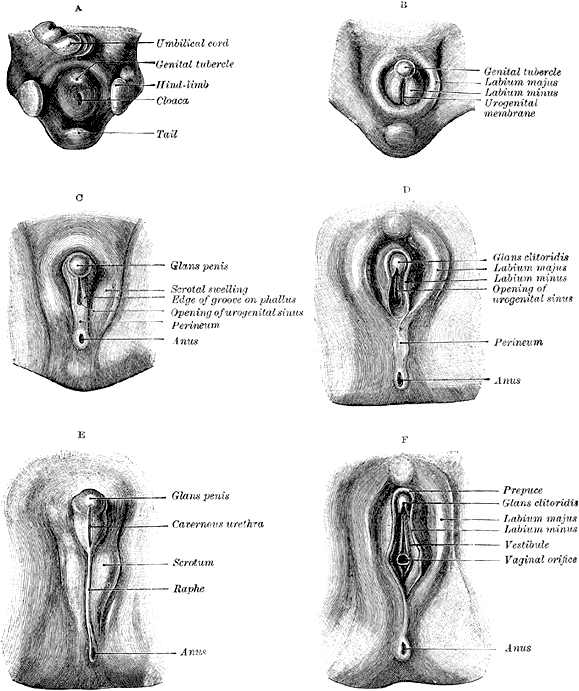
Stages in the development of the external sexual organs in the male and female

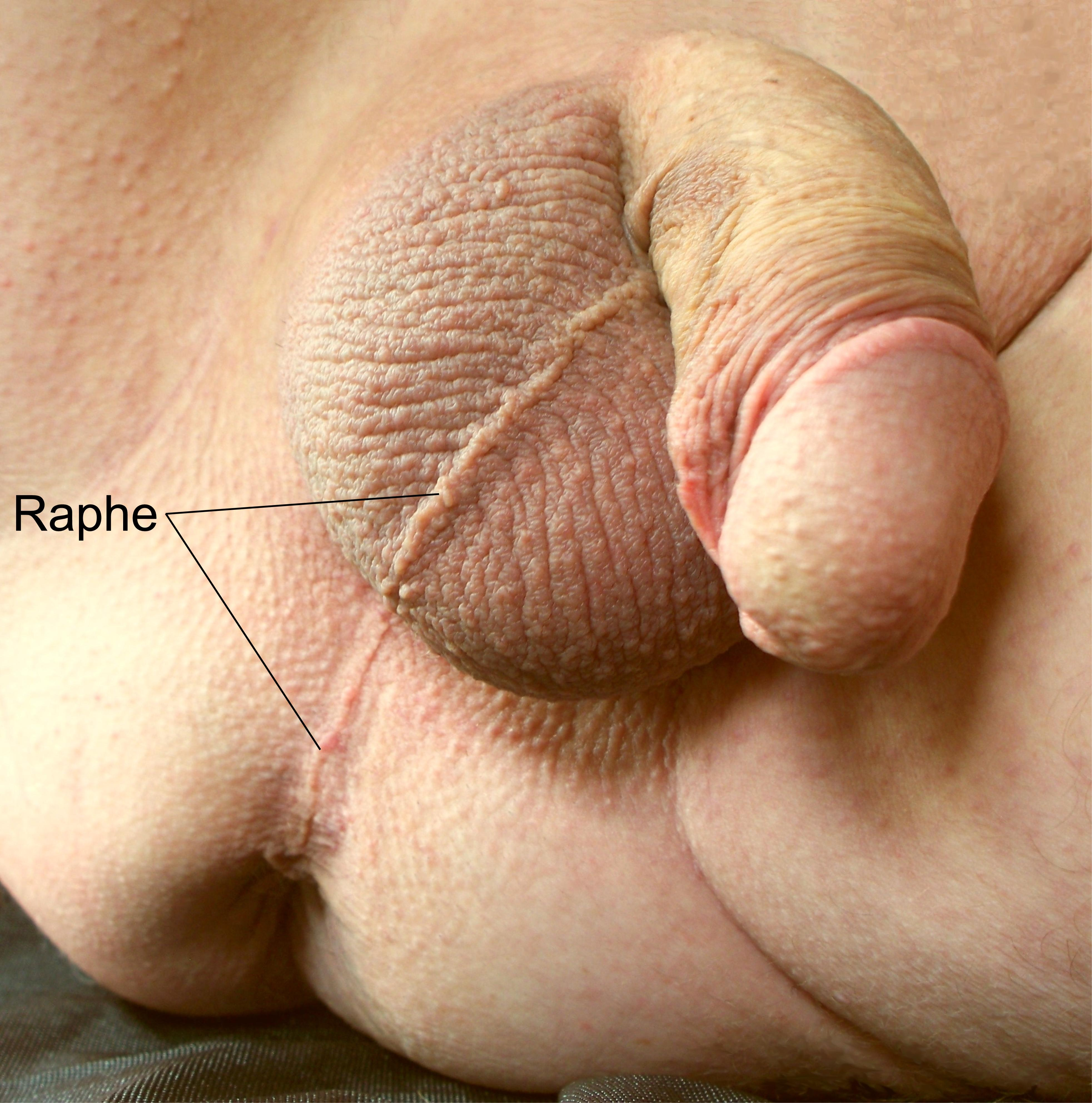
Perineal and scrotal raphe

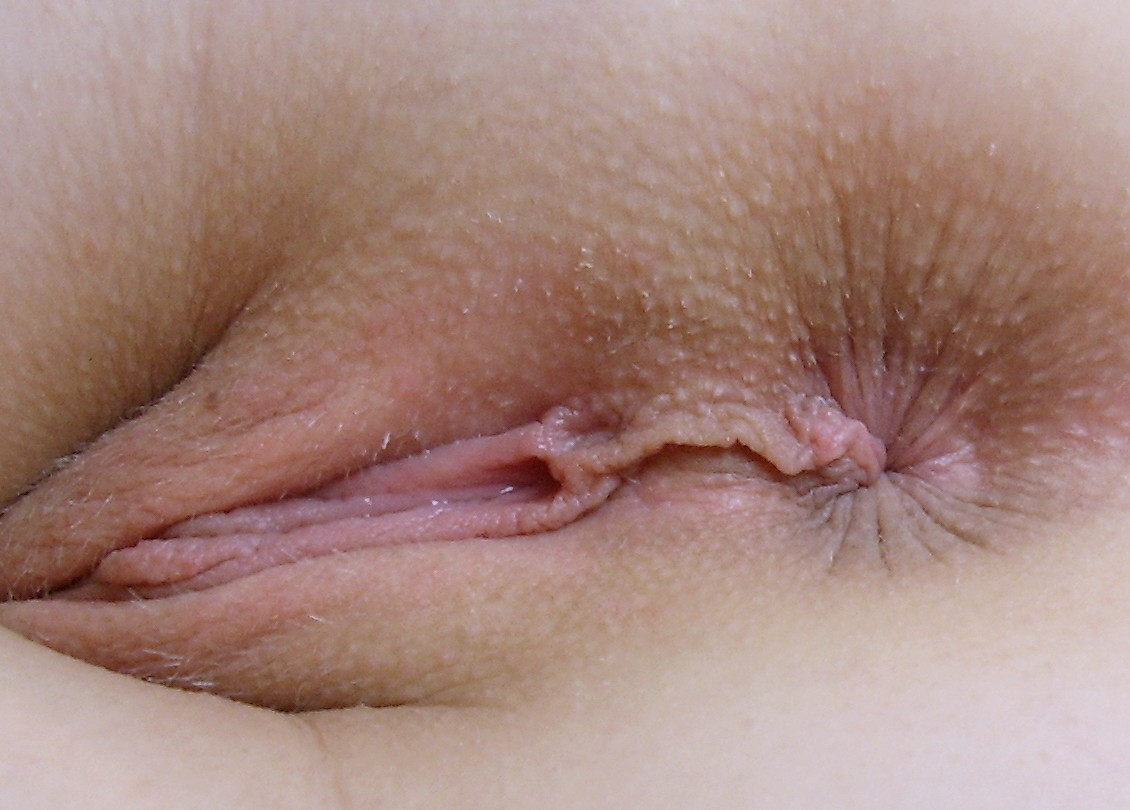
Perineal raphe in female
