= Anterior scrotal nerves =

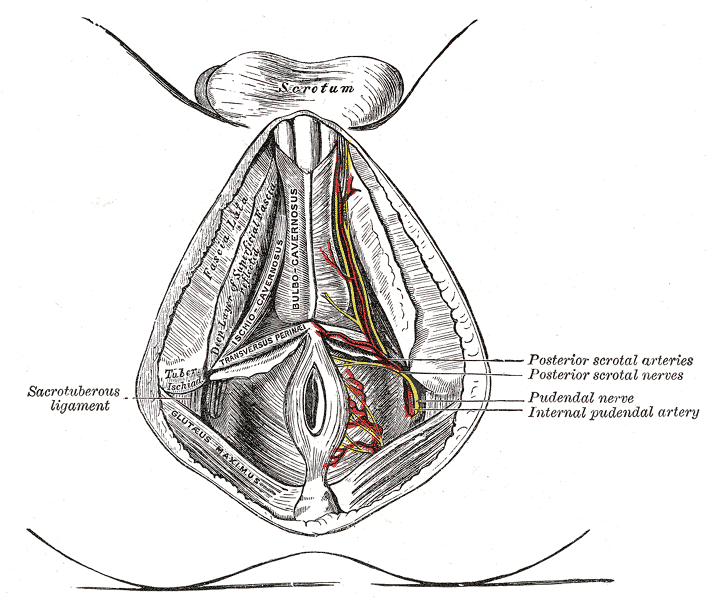
- superficial branches of the anterior scrotal nerves.

Details
- From: Ilioinguinal nerve
- Innervates: Scrotum

Identifiers
- Latin: nervi scrotales anteriores
- TA98: A14.2.07.007
- TA2: 6501
- FMA: 75479

The anterior scrotal nerves are branches of the ilioinguinal nerve. The nerves innervates the scrotum in males.

== See also ==
- Posterior labial nerves
- Posterior labial veins
- Posterior scrotal nerves
- Posterior scrotal veins
