= Linea nigra =

Dark vertical line that appears on the abdomen during pregnancy

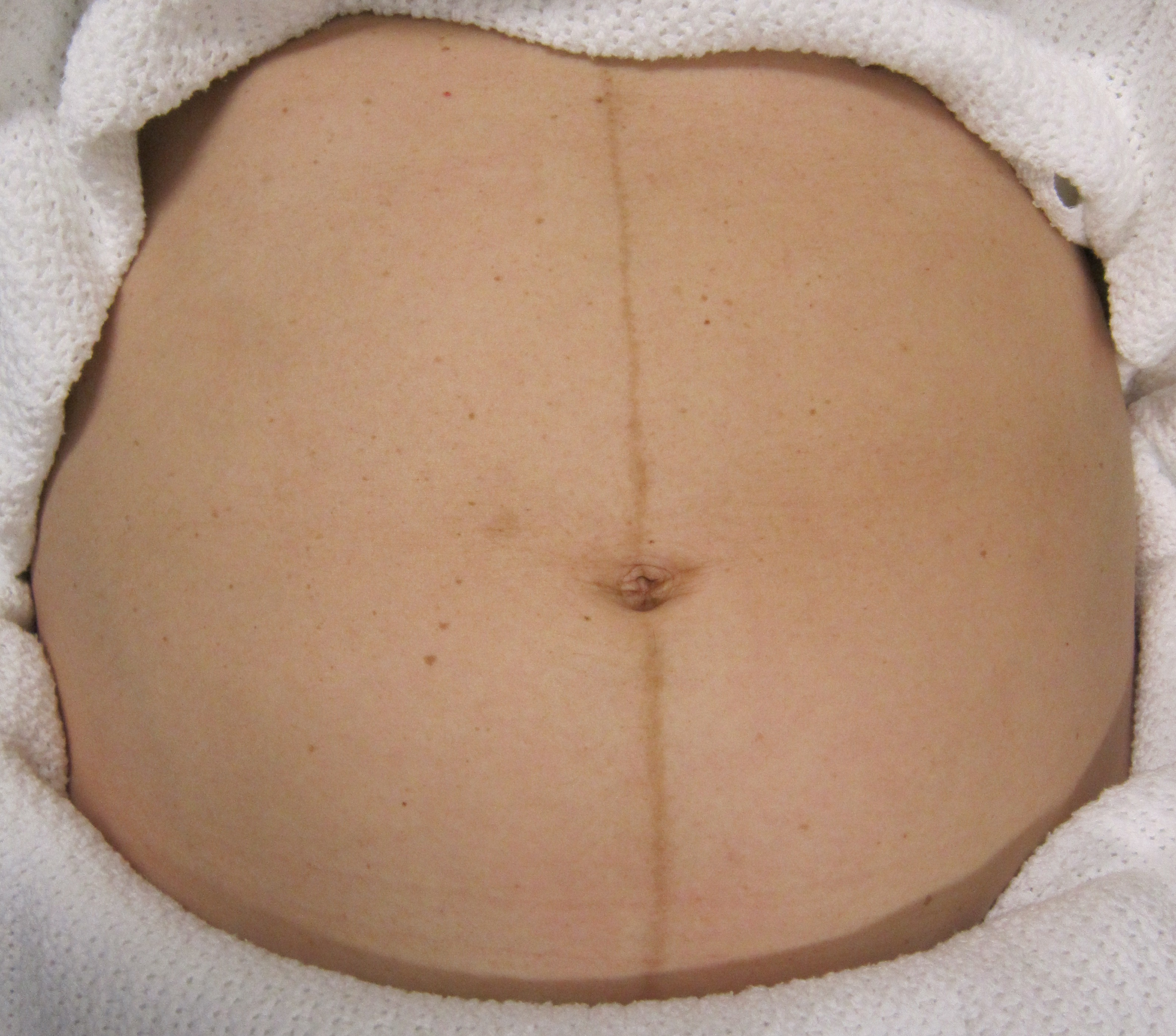
Linea nigra as seen in a pregnant woman

Linea nigra (Latin for "black line"), colloquially known as the pregnancy line, manifests as a linear area of heightened pigmentation frequently observed on the abdominal region during pregnancy. Typically spanning approximately one centimeter (0.4 in) in width, this brownish streak extends vertically along the midline of the abdomen, spanning from the pubis to the umbilicus. Variably, it may traverse from the pubis to the upper abdominal region.

For pregnant women, the emergence of linea nigra is attributed to an increased production of melanocyte-stimulating hormone by the placenta. This physiological phenomenon is concomitant with the occurrence of melasma and darkened nipples. Individuals with lighter skin pigmentation tend to exhibit this phenomenon less frequently in comparison to those possessing darker pigmentation. It is typical for the linea nigra to fade and dissipate within several months following childbirth.

Although predominantly associated with pregnancy, it can manifest in people of either sex and at all ages. Beyond the gestational context, its prevalence is found to be uniformly elevated in either sex during the ages of 11 to 15. This is potentially attributable to hormonal fluctuations characteristic of puberty. After age 15, the prevalence of the linea nigra declines. Particularly in postpubescent people, it often serves as an indicator of elevated benign estrogens. The prevalence of this phenomenon drops below 10% following the age of 30. Furthermore, its appearance may ensue after rapid weight gain over a short interval. It could also rarely serve as an indicator of underlying hormonal imbalances, genetic disorders, malignancy, inflammation, or even fungal infections.

== See also ==
- Chadwick's sign
- Linea alba
- List of cutaneous conditions
- Perineal raphe
