= Penile raphe =

Line of tissue on the human penis

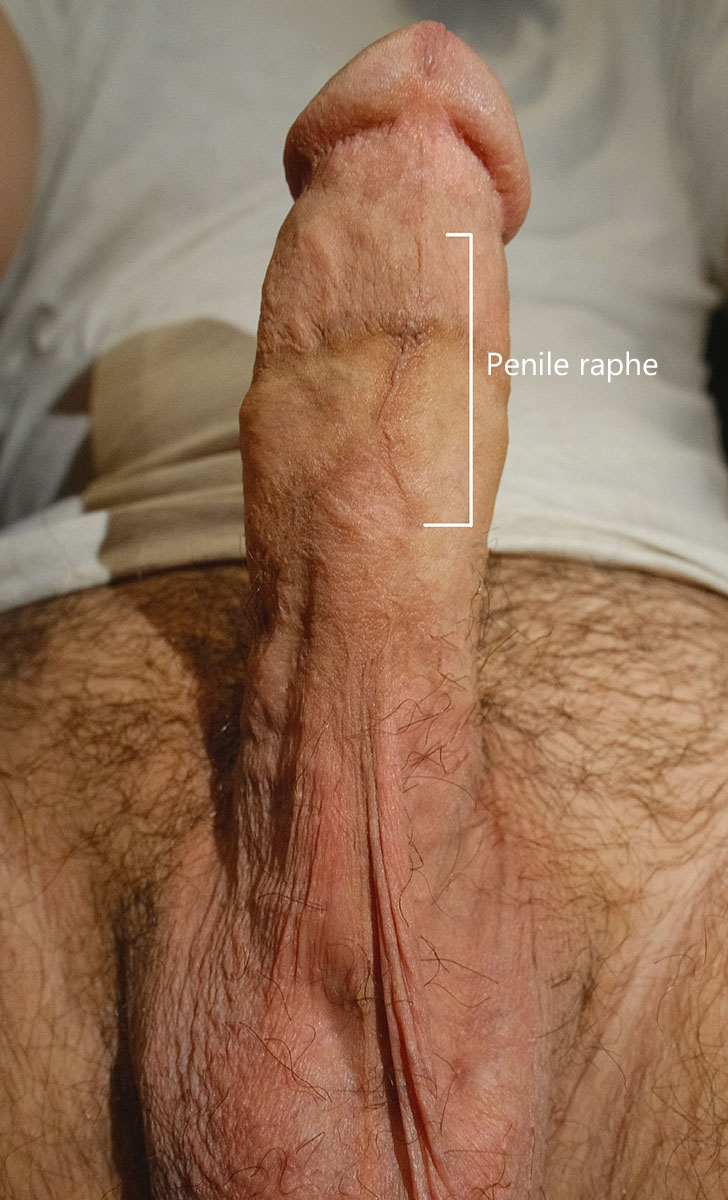
- Ventral photo of a human erect penis with a highly visible penile raphe

Details
- Precursor: Urogenital folds
- Part of: Penis

Identifiers
- Latin: raphe penis

The penile raphe (/ˈrā-fē/) is a visible line or ridge of tissue that runs on the ventral (urethral) side of the human penis beginning from the base of the shaft and ending in the prepuce between the penile frenulum. The line is typically darker than the rest of the shaft skin, even though its shape and pigmentation may vary greatly among males. The penile raphe is part of a broader line in the male reproductive organs that runs from the anus through the perineum (perineal raphe) and continues to the scrotum and penis, where it is collectively referred to as median raphe. The penile raphe along with the skin between it are homologous to the female labia minora.

The line consists of a subcutaneous fibrous plate, which may vary in prominence and thickness in various areas of the genitals. In the scrotum, the line is located over the internal scrotal septum that divides the two sides of the sac and is densely occupied by nerve fibers. The raphe may become more prominent and darker when the scrotal sac tightens due to contractions. Behind the scrotum, it continues as the perineal raphe. The raphe results as a manifestation of the fusion of the labioscrotal, urogenital and preputial folds during the embryonic development of the male fetus.

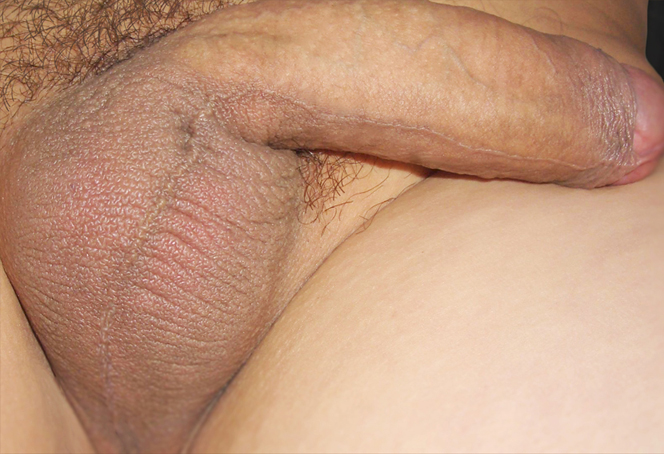
The penile raphe often continues from the scrotum directly up to the penis to form part of the median raphe

== See also ==
- Raphe
