= External pudendal veins =

Blood vessels of the pelvis

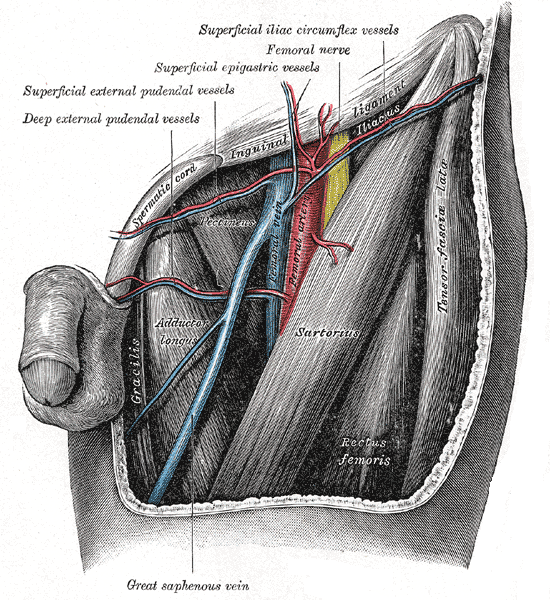
- The left femoral triangle. (Superficial external pudendal vessels labeled at upper left.)

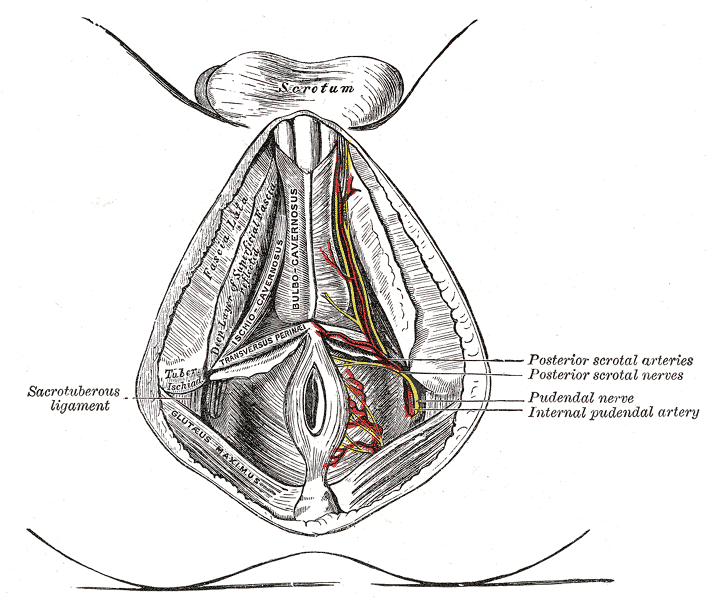
- The superficial branches of the external pudendal veins.

Details
- Source: Superficial dorsal vein of the penis/clitoris Anterior scrotal veins/Anterior labial veins
- Drains to: Femoral vein
- Artery: External pudendal artery

Identifiers
- Latin: venae pudendae externae
- TA98: A12.3.11.004
- TA2: 5059
- FMA: 70915

The external pudendal veins (deep pudendal and superficial pudendal) are veins of the pelvis which drain into the great saphenous and femoral veins.

== Additional images ==
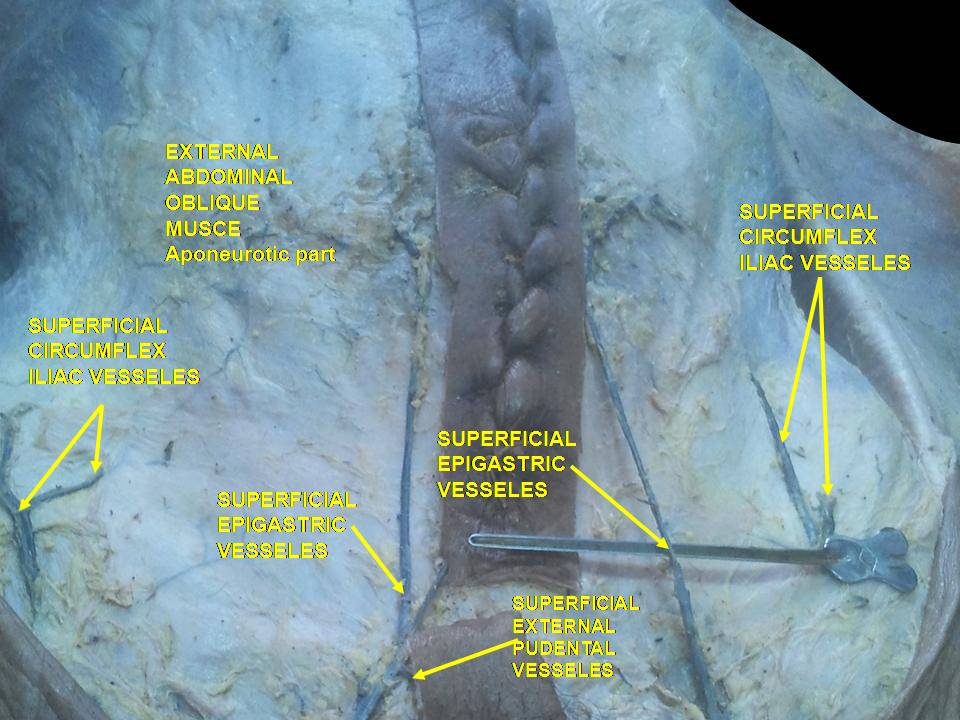
Anterior abdominal wall. Superficial dissection. Anterior view.

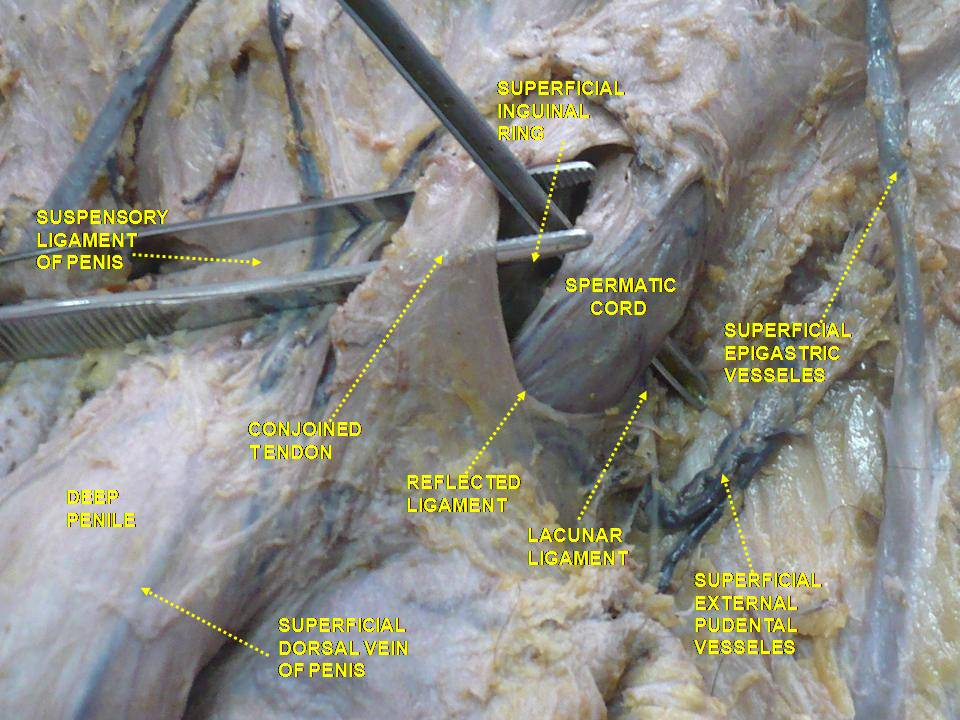
Anterior abdominal wall. Intermediate dissection. Anterior view

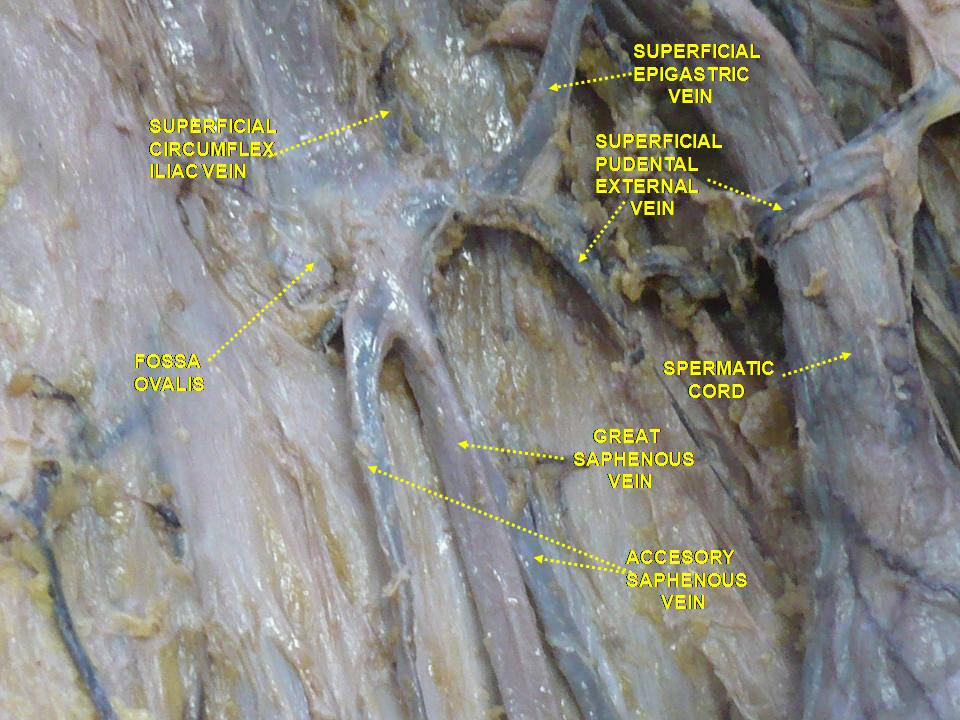
Superficial veins of lower limb. Superficial dissection. Anterior view.

== See also ==
- Internal pudendal veins
