= Posterior scrotal arteries =

Artery

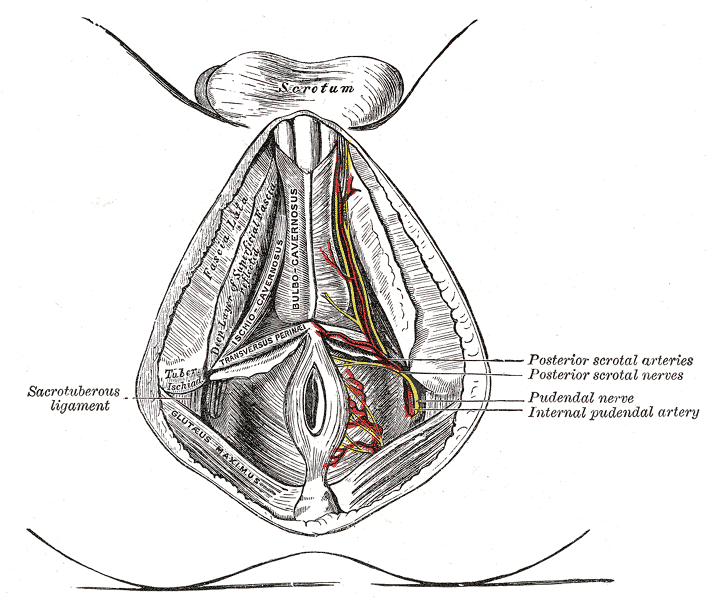
- The superficial branches of the internal pudendal artery. (Posterior scrotal arteries labeled at center right.)

Details
- Source: Internal pudendal artery
- Vein: Posterior scrotal veins
- Supplies: Scrotum

Identifiers
- Latin: rami scrotales posteriores arteriae pudendae internae
- TA98: A12.2.15.041M
- TA2: 4345
- FMA: 75585

The posterior scrotal arteries are branches of the internal pudendal artery.

== Function ==
The posterior scrotal arteries supply part of the scrotum in men.

== See also ==
- Anterior scrotal arteries
