= Posterior scrotal veins =

Veins of the scrotum

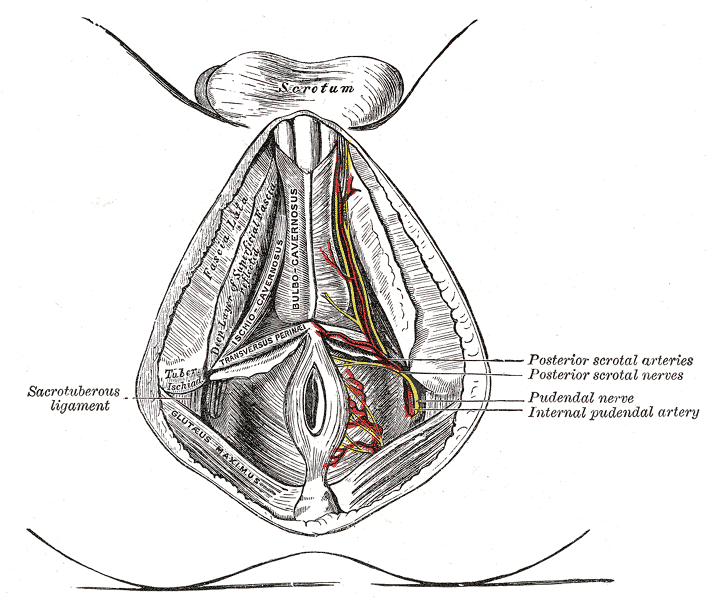
- Posterior scrotal veins listed as "Posterior Scrotal Arteries" pointing at the red vessel

Details
- Drains from: Scrotum
- Drains to: Vesical venous plexus
- Artery: Posterior scrotal arteries

Identifiers
- Latin: venae scrotales posteriores
- TA98: A12.3.10.022M
- TA2: 5035
- FMA: 75396

The posterior scrotal veins are veins of the scrotum. They accompany the posterior scrotal arteries. They drain into the vesical venous plexus. They help to drain blood from part of the scrotum.

== Structure ==
The posterior scrotal veins accompany the posterior scrotal arteries. They lie superficially in the scrotum. They drain into the vesical venous plexus.

== Function ==
The posterior scrotal veins help to drain blood from part of the scrotum in men.
