= Jean Dessès =

Greek fashion designer (1904 - 1970)

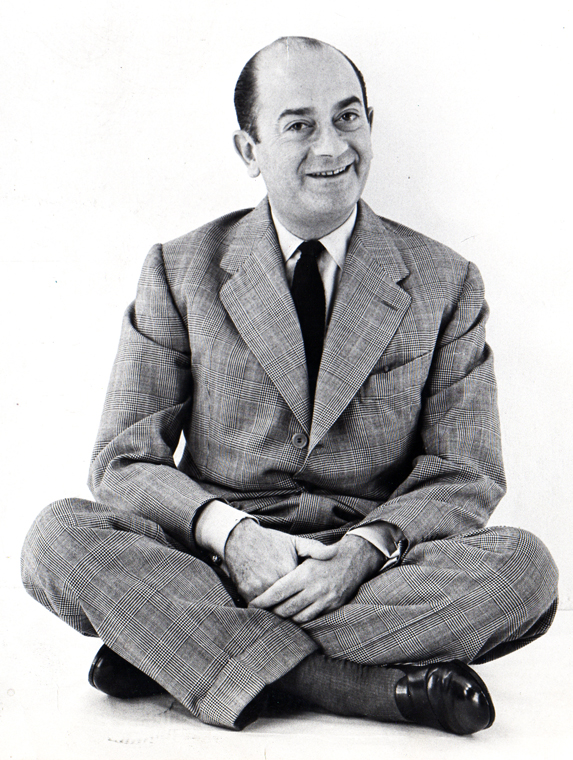
- Born: Yanis Demetrios Salvago; August 6, 1904; Alexandria, Egypt
- Died: August 2, 1970 (aged 65); Athens, Greece
- Known for: Fashion design, haute couture
- Parents: Constantine Salvago (father); Virginia Benaki-Dessès (mother)
- Relatives: Emmanouil Benakis, grandfather

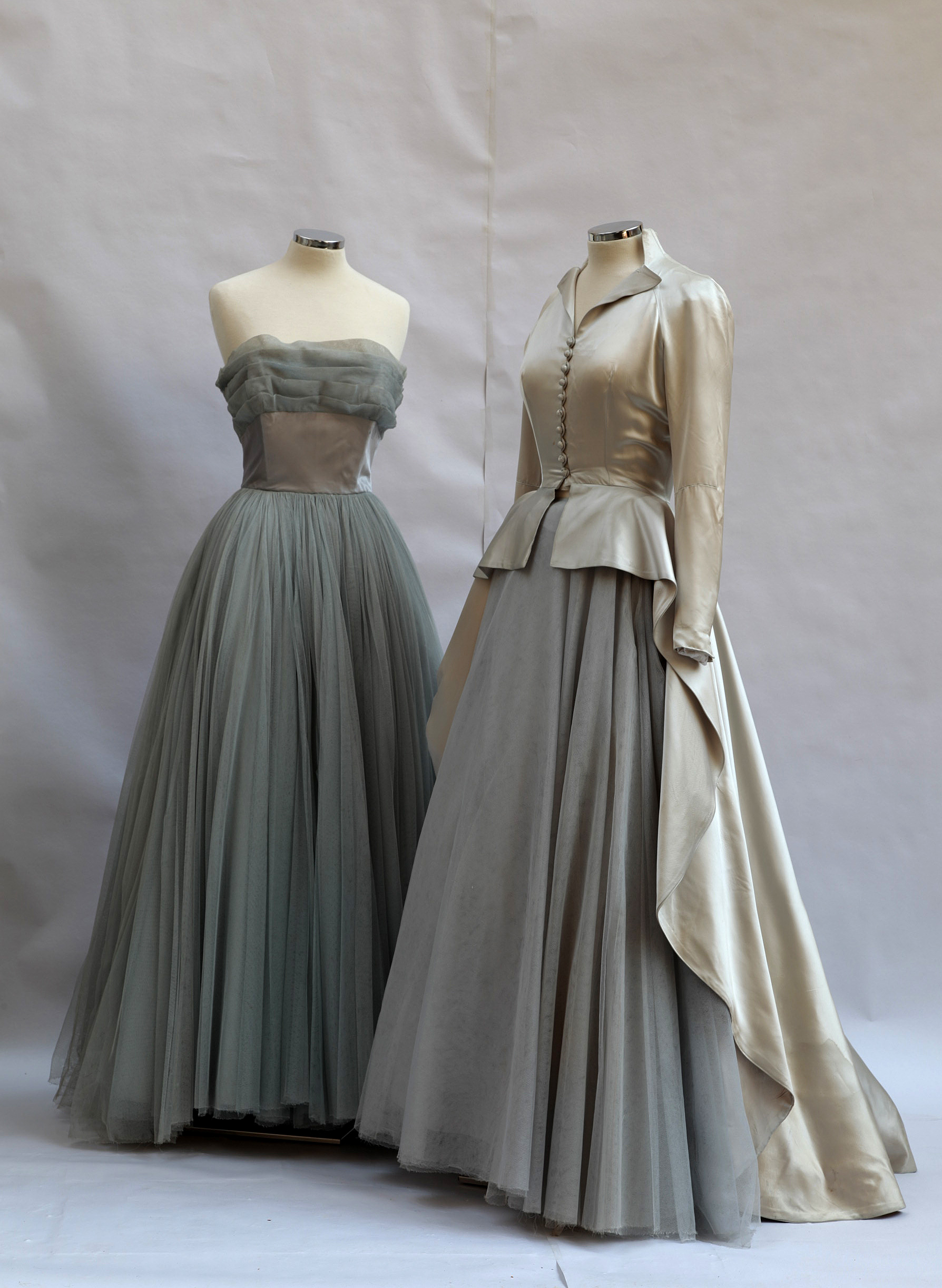
Two Dessès Gowns, 1951

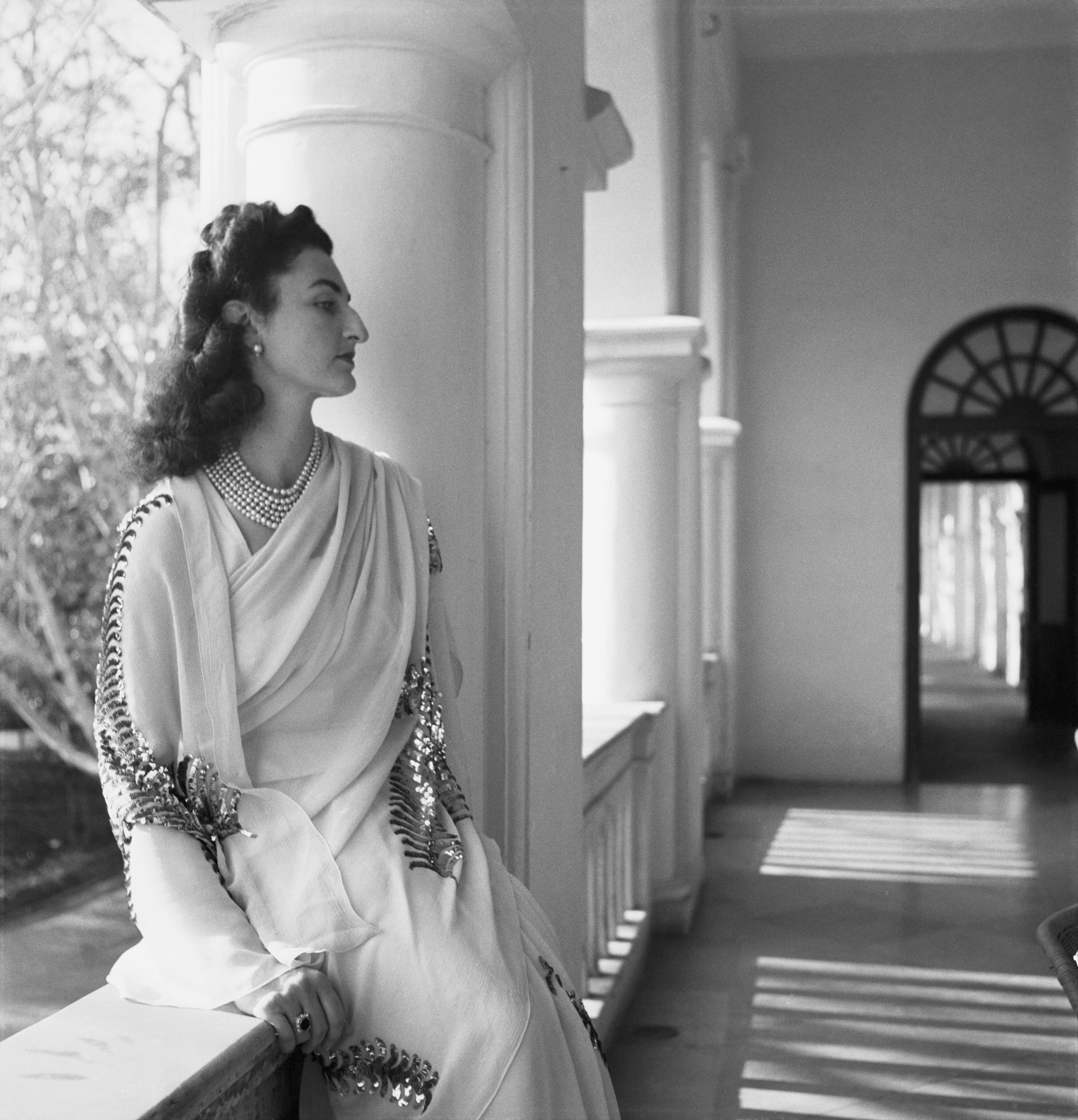
Princess Durru Shehvar in a Dessès Gown, photographed by Cecil Beaton

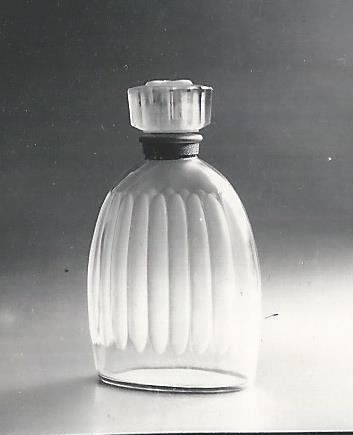
The Celui de Jean Dessès bottle, designed by Pierre Camin

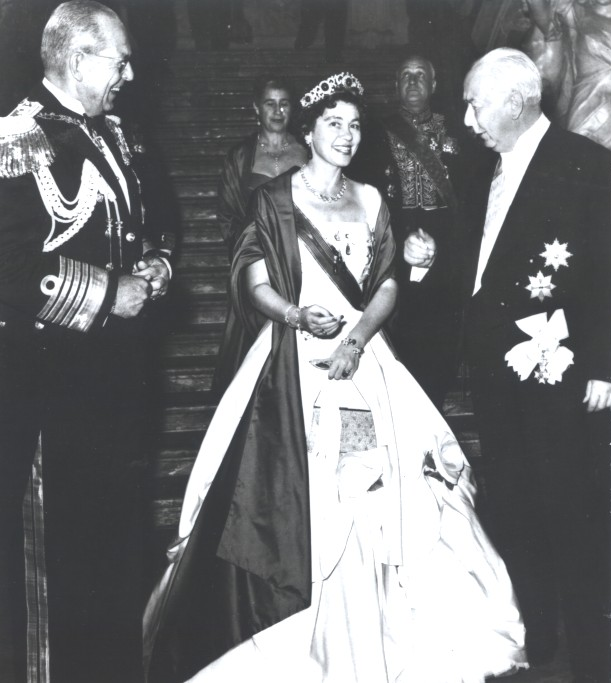
Queen Frederica in Dessès, Germany 1954

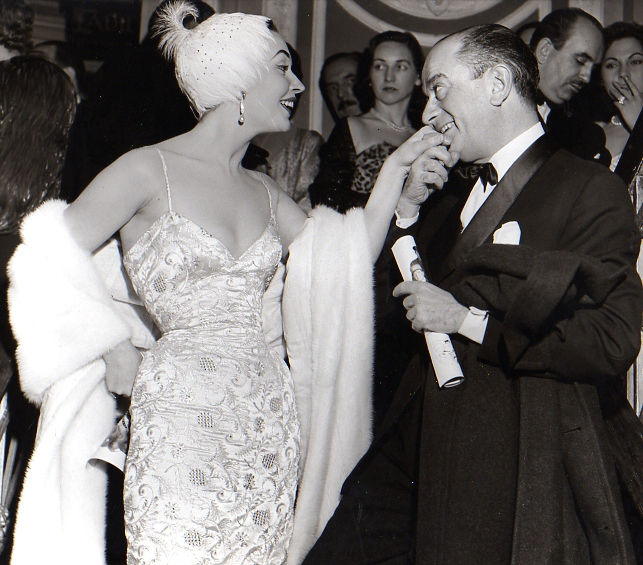
Dessès with Jacqueline de Ribes

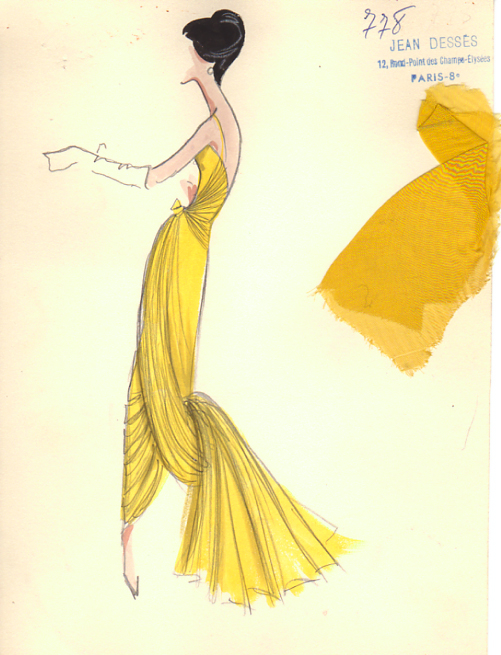
A drawing of a 1950s Dessès gown

Jean Dessès (6 August 1904 – 2 August 1970) was a Greek Egyptian fashion designer, who was among the most prominent couturiers in Paris from the 1930s to 1960. Known for his lavishly draped gowns, he was one of the preferred designers among the international aristocracy and was one of the Big Four of 1950s haute couture, the others being Christian Dior, Pierre Balmain and Jacques Fath.

== Early life and education ==
Yanis Demetrios Salvago was born in Alexandria on August 6, 1904, to one of the wealthiest families in Egypt. Both of his parents descended from the aristocracy of the Greek island of Chios, who fled to Egypt after the 1822 Chios massacre. His maternal great-grandfather, Konstantinos Choremis (1796 - 1878), established a cotton trading business in Alexandria; his maternal grandfather, Emmanouil Benakis (1843-1929), did the same. In 1876, the two companies merged to form Choremi, Benachi & Co., which became the largest cotton exporter in Egypt and one of the largest exporters in the world. Financing the cotton trade was the Salvago family; Dessès' paternal grandfather, Constantine Salvago, co-founded the Bank of Alexandria and the National Bank of Egypt. The children of the families inter-married; in 1901, Desses' father, Constantin Michael Salvago (1876-1948) married Virginia (Arghyro, or Argine) Benaki (1883–1972), who used the original spelling of her family's name and added 'Dessès' ('of the'), becoming known as Virginia Benaki-Dessès Salvago. In 1913, the couple built the grand Salvago Villa, designed by the French architect Jean Walter, where they raised their three children: Constantin 'Mike' (1902-1963), Yanis, and Julia ('Lila') (1906-2008).

Virginia was a cultured woman from a cultured family—her sister was the writer Penelope Delta; her brother was the art collector Antonis Benakis. She was known as one of the "Uncrowned Queens of Egypt", "one of Europe’s most beautiful women" and the Grande Dame of Alexandrian society. She too was an art collector, particularly of antique Persian jewellery and Ottoman textiles; most of her collection is now in the Benaki Museum in Athens, which was founded by Antonis. Virginia had been raised by French governesses and was the "toast of Paris" in her youth. While her children attended the Averofio Greek School, she maintained a European household; Arabic was not spoken in the house, her children's governesses were French and English, and her sons were called 'Michel' and 'Jean'. Virginia was the arbiter of fashion in Alexandria and employed her own seamstress. Jean grew up sitting in on his mother’s fittings, studying draping, pattern-making and fabric selection, and helping his mother organize her textile collection. He pored over fashion magazines from London and Paris and saw French and Italian films to see what the stars were wearing. By age 10, he was designing clothes; his first dress was a white organdy gown which his mother wore to a garden party. After that, he began making dresses for his friends and cousins.

Jean was smart and outgoing, with a winning personality. His family wanted him to become a diplomat. He was sent to the Lycée Français d'Alexandrie to study politics and economics, and then to the University of Paris Faculty of Law. He had no interest in his studies and spent most of his time sketching clothes. One of his friends showed his sketches to a dressmaker, now known only as Madame Jane Francois, who sought out Jean and offered him a job. Jean, then age 21, quit school and, for an annual salary of 150,000 francs, became the designer at Maison Jane. He styled himself 'Jean Dessès' and stayed at Maison Jane for ten years.

== Career ==
In July 1937, at age 33, Dessès opened Maison Dessès, in partnership with his cousins Constantin Salvago and Etienne 'Stefy' Salvago. Dessès was the minority partner; there were two other minority shareholders, and Stefy had the largest share. The business bought a six-storey Haussmann building at 37 Avenue George V. The salon's decor, by designer André Mercier, was white curtains, satin-covered purple and gray chairs, and white walls decorated with palm trees, palm leaf moldings, and palm leaf sconces.

Nothing is known about Dessès' time at Maison Jane but it can be assumed that he had developed a strong reputation, as his house received extensive media attention from the day it opened. Dessès held his first show in September 1937, when L'Officiel wrote that he "continues to be among the most interesting innovators in Couture". The reviewer noted his "mastery" with color, the "perfection of the cut" and that his details and trimmings combined to create a "high-class collection". Women’s Wear Daily lauded Dessès’ attention to detail and his creation of "Pre-War elegance" (meaning Edwardian). From September 1937 onward, Dessès was constantly in the media; in 1938 alone, coverage of shows at Maison Dessès appeared in eight editions of L’Officiel. That year, Dessès launched his first fragrance, Celui de Jean Dessès, a chypre-floral scent created by perfumer Paul Vacher and marketed as "the perfume as sweet as a secret". Also in 1938, Maison Dessès was the subject of a two-minute film by British Pathe called Fashion Comes to Paris!, which shows Dessès quickly 'making' a dress, although that is deceptive because Dessès' garments were complicated.

Dessès was known for his innovative cutting technique and mastery of draping. His gowns, usually of silk jersey, featured his signature: voluminous swags and draping and double- or triple-tiered hems. Sashes and bodices were intricately twisted over a boned base. Colors were pale pastels, often with varying shades of the same hue. He was fond of asymmetry and, instead of surface decoration, his ornamentation came from the structure of the gown, e.g. the closure of a dress would be covered with a gold and emerald clasp—most of his jewellery was designed by him and created by Mauboussin. He was particularly fond of creating 'transformation garments', which had layers or panels that folded out, or in, to turn a piece into something completely different.

During the Occupation, Dessès was able to stay open, but he adopted a more simple, clean-lined look. Obtaining certain fabrics was problematic, so his wartime dresses were of lightweight wool, canvas or crêpe; all crease-resistant, versatile and understated. At the time, his gowns were priced at 3800 francs, or the 2026 US equivalent of $2600.00. Also during the war, Dessès began designing costumes for films, dressing Michèle Alfa and Gaby André in L’Ange de la nuit (1944) and Marlene Dietrich in Martin Roumagnac (1946). When the war ended in 1945, Dessès left Paris; his mother was moving her textiles and jewelry collection to the Benaki Museum; Dessès escorted the collection to advise on its display and spent a year in Greece, visiting its islands, villages and museums and developing an interest in traditional Greek clothing that influenced his work from then on.

During the war, the Greek royal family was living in exile in Egypt and was well-acquainted with Dessès' family. In 1946, the royal family returned to Greece and, while Dessès was in Athens, Queen Frederica was preparing to attend the wedding of Princess Elizabeth. She commissioned Dessès to make the wardrobe for her trip and, for the rest of his life, Dessès was the (unofficial) couturier to the Queen of Greece, and the women in her family. Between that, and his fabulous film wardrobe for Dietrich, Dessès garments were suddenly in demand by a much larger group of women, which included such style setters as the Duchess of Windsor, Tina Onassis, the Maharani of Jaipur and Jacqueline de Ribes, who became his muse.

=== Expansion ===
When Dessès returned to Paris in 1947, he executed a major expansion of the House of Dessès. First, the salon was moved to No. 1 rue Rabelais, a grand building that was the former home of Gustave Eiffel. Lucien Lelong had abruptly closed his business, leaving hundreds of people unemployed; Dessès was able to hire most of them. The mansion centered around a large courtyard which became a venue for fashion shows, and it was next door to the ultra-exclusive Jockey Club, which supplied a steady stream of wealthy husbands. The décor, by Christian Dior’s decorator Victor Grandpierre, was peach and champagne; the walls were covered with Shantung and mirrors, and the lighting technique was the same as that recently installed at the Louvre. Dessès hired Guy Laroche as his assistant, and held his first post-war show in November of 1948. During this period, he designed the costumes for three films: he dressed Maria Schell in Nach dem Sturm (1948), Mary Marquet in Interdit au Public (1949), and Arlette Thomas in Le Paradis des pilotes perdus (The Hell of Lost Pilots). He also launched a second perfume, Eau Nouvelle Jean Dessès.

The reason for the expansion was that the House of Dessès was about to go into ready-to-wear and retail. On the ground floor of his building, Dessès opened the Soeurs Hortense (Hydrangea Sisters), two boutiques, one painted pink and one painted blue. One was for ready-to-wear garments, the other for accessories and hats, all at affordable prices. Initially, the stores sold small-batch items but, under the management of Dessès’ sister Lila Ralli, the concept was so successful that, in 1953, the boutiques were merged and expanded into the Dessès Bazaar. Here, there was a stage for fashion shows and women could buy made-to-measure dresses, hosiery, knitwear, jewelry, handbags, furs, and negligees.

=== Expansion to the USA ===
In October 1949, Dessès made his first visit to the United States, accompanied by Ralli and Stefy. He spent seven weeks traveling the country, meeting with department stores and attending social events. He received a lot of attention—Women’s Wear Daily covered his arrival in New York, and his reception at Garfinckel's in Washington, where he told the media "You in America are experts in casual clothes creations, the French have mastered the art of creating formal clothes. Jointly we can offer a product that will bring greater awareness to quality fashions in the United States." In New York, he attended the Knickerbocker Ball, which featured socialites modeling 14 designs by top couturiers; the Dessès gown caused a sensation when it won "Gown of the Year" over the Dior gown. He was the special guest of Stanley Marcus at a luncheon in Dallas, and received a full feature in the Christian Science Monitor. Dessès told the media that he was only in the USA to acquaint himself with the market but, when he returned to Paris, he had sales contracts with Nieman Marcus, Marshall Field’s and Garfinckel's, and he had licensed negligee designs to the loungewear manufacturer Raymodes becoming, as Women's Wear Daily reported, the first Paris couturier to design negligées for Americans. His convertible cotton "hostess fashions" became all the rage, as did his gowns, which were favored by style icons such as Babe Paley and, in particular, Slim Keith, who became a close friend and muse.

Dessès contract with Raymodes gave him creative control over all items sold under his name and he began spending two months at a time in New York. He traveled with Stefy, and they negotiated additional contracts. Dessès' arrangement with Raymodes expanded to include evening gowns and, in 1952, he announced that he was designing coats for I.M. Bagedonow, dresses for Nanty Frocks, blouses for the Alper Blouse Co., and gloves for Ireland Bros. All of this was marketed under the name Jean Dessès Diffusion and everything was affordable, with a coat selling for $69 to $150. In 1952, Desses, who was now facing stiff competition in the US from Dior, declared that the "short jacket has become so wide-spread that it has outlived its popularity", and that "the average woman wants something new". Women’s Wear Daily described Dessès' Bagedonow high-waisted wool coats as "Empire in inspiration" and his suits, of gabardine and mohair, were unconventional, with loose jackets and wide sleeves. The American licensing deals were extremely lucrative. In Paris, this allowed Desses to expand again. In 1950, the couturière Marcelle Dormoy closed her house; she moved to Maison Dessès as production manager, bringing with her a highly experienced staff and a long list of devoted clients. Also in 1950, Desses hired a new apprentice, the 18 year-old Valentino Garavini, who would stay with him for five years.

By the mid-1950s, with post-war austerity and the deaths of such couturiers as Jacques Fath and Robert Piguet, the number of Paris fashion houses was down to approximately 50. For Dessès, business was booming. He was now earning the nickname "King of Chiffon", as he produced intricately pleated or shirred silk chiffon gowns with voluminous skirts. Occasionally, he would mix black with bright colors, but most of his designs were in Wedgewood blue, old rose, pastel green, pale brown, dove gray, and shades of pink. The technical complexity never waned; some of his gowns used as much as 50 yards of chiffon over a boned construction which took weeks to complete.

In 1954, Dessès entered into two more licensing agreements, for the European market, with Amédée and Prouvost & Sons. He worked on six films, dressing Anne Baxter in Bedevilled (1955), Gisèle Pascal in Mademoiselle from Paris (1955), Kay Kendall in Abdulla the Great (1955), María Félix in Faustina (1957), Simone Renant in The Ostrich Has Two Eggs (1957), and Martine Carol in Nathalie (1957). Singers Maria Callas and Dalida became two of his most loyal customers, for on- and off-stage clothing, as did the actresses Claudette Colbert, Michèle Morgan and Danielle Darrieux. But socialites and royalty remained his core clientele. In 1960, Desses told the New York Times that he had designed the trousseau for Princess Margaret’s wedding, and revealed that he had been, "for some time", secretly dressing her, the Duchess of Kent, and Princess Alexandra. In 1962, he made international headlines when he designed the wedding gown for Queen Sofía of Spain.

=== Restructuring ===
In 1957, the Eiffel building’s owner decided to demolish the building and Dessès had to move. He found a smaller space at a better address—12, Rond Point de Champs-Élysées, and moved there in November 1958. He laid off staff and contracted his ready-to-wear manufacturing to the French apparel manufacturer Maria Carine. He would later say that the move increased his sales by 30%, as the building's modern design and décor, in grays and beige, better complemented his designs.

In 1957, following the death of Stefy Salvago and the Suez Crisis, the House of Dessès was corporately restructured. In Egypt, Mike had inherited C.M. Salvago & Co. when their father died in 1948. In addition to turning the company into an industrial giant, he became the Egyptian representative for Aristotle Onassis' Olympic Maritime and Olympic Airways. Mike had seen the writing on the wall; in 1960, the government of Egypt seized and nationalized all large private companies, completely wiping out the Salvago family’s holdings. Mike moved to Athens and, in October 1961, and possibly with the assistance of Onassis, opened a branch of the House of Dessès, including a couture salon and boutique—Dessès called it an "Island of French Elegance". However, the loss of the Salvago family funds meant that Dessès had no single financial backer, which all fashion operations need. Onassis offered to be his backer, but he wanted to buy the company outright; Dessès would be the figurehead with no hand in running the business. Dessès refused. In March of 1958, after months of tense negotiations, Onassis was rebuffed. Dessès announced that he had found a majority backer, who was not named, and that he retained 51% of his company. He then became the first couturier in history to publicly sell shares in his company, with the remaining 49% taken mostly by 50 of his long-term clients, including de Ribes and Tina Onassis, who paid the equivalent of $1000 a share. When all of this was over, Dessès said he felt like "a new man".

=== Athens ===
The Salvagos weren't the only Egyptian family to lose their holdings; the large Egyptian corporations had all been seized and nationalized. Most of the Greek-Egyptian community now flooded into Athens. At the same time, Greece was experiencing a massive boom in tourism and had become the destination of choice for the "jet set". Between that and the fact that he was dressing the Greek royals, Dessès business grew rapidly. He expanded his ready-to-wear output and launched two new fragrances: Kalispera and, for men, Gymkhana. By 1963, the Athens operation was financially supporting the Paris operation. But, in that year, Michael died. The Age of Glamour had come to an end. Dessès decided to close his Paris atelier and leave couture behind, stating "Couture is old and sick and finished". He dismissed his staff and, on June 30, 1963, closed his Paris house and moved to Athens. There was no regret: he said "I am young again. It is the most exciting time of my life". He told the press that he was taking a year to reconfigure his business and find a suitable location for a Paris store. In 1964, he held a couture collection show for buyers and the press in Paris but, after that, he stayed in Athens. He continued with couture for select clients, but focused mainly on ready-to-wear, fragrances and accessories.

In 1968, the fragrance company Jaquet attempted to buy Dessès' fragrances then, as Dessès was clearly ill, offered to buy his whole company. Dessès' negotiated but ultimately declined the offer. He had not hired an assistant after Valentino, relying instead on Dormoy, and he had not groomed anyone to succeed him. His was a large family—Stefy had 15 siblings. But his sister Lila had left the business years earlier and, evidently, no family member was interested in taking it over. When he died, completed garments were sold at auction and the Athens operation was closed. His long-term licensing arrangements continued; as late as 1976, the New York wholesaler Creations III was selling Jean Dessès shawls, scarves and accessories.

== Personal life and death ==
Dessès never married, but he fathered one son, the artist Jean-Pierre Cassigneul (born 1935). Dessès died in Athens, following a long illness, through which he had been nursed by Guy Laroche, on August 4, 1970, age 65.

== Gallery ==
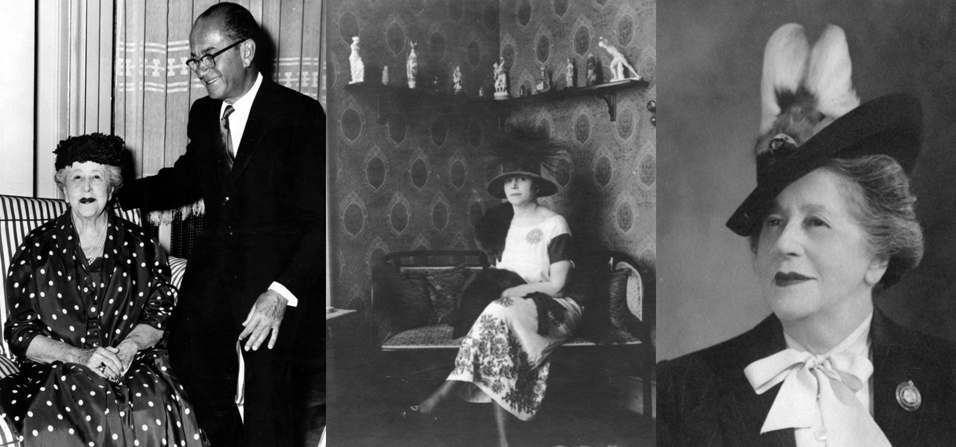
Virginia Benaki-Dessès Salvago

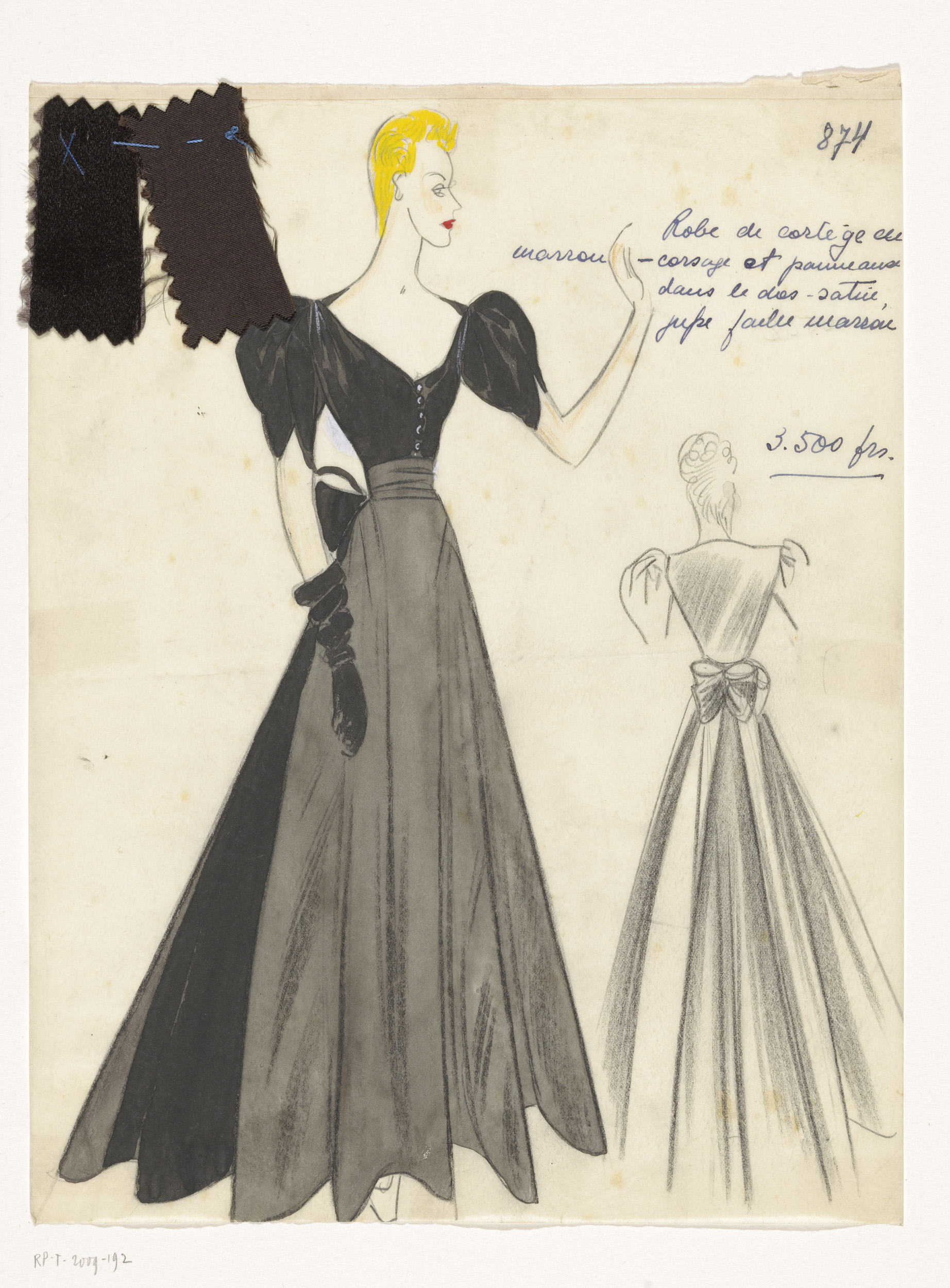
Brown satin bridesmaid's dress 1939

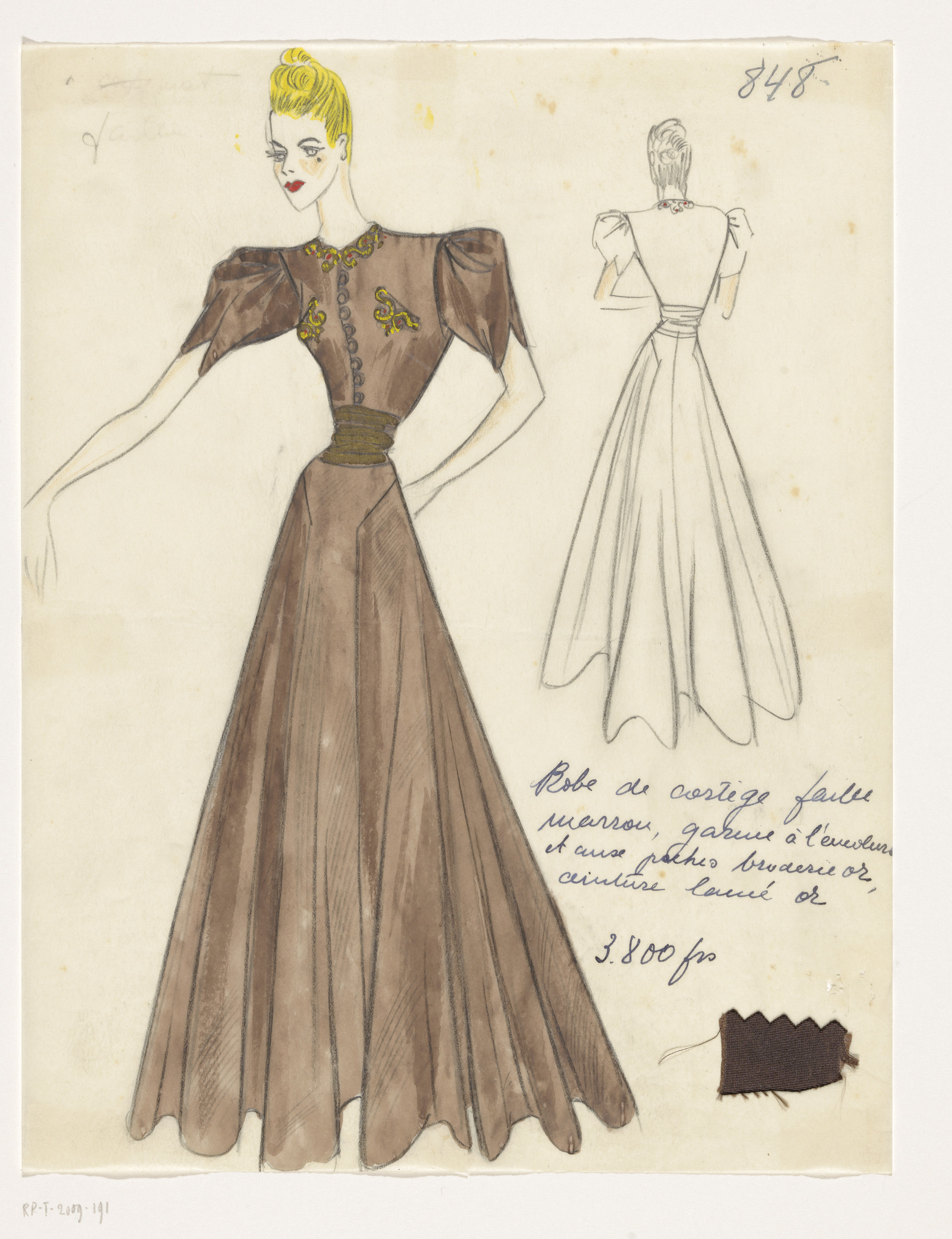
Brown satin bridesmaid's dress with gold trim 1939

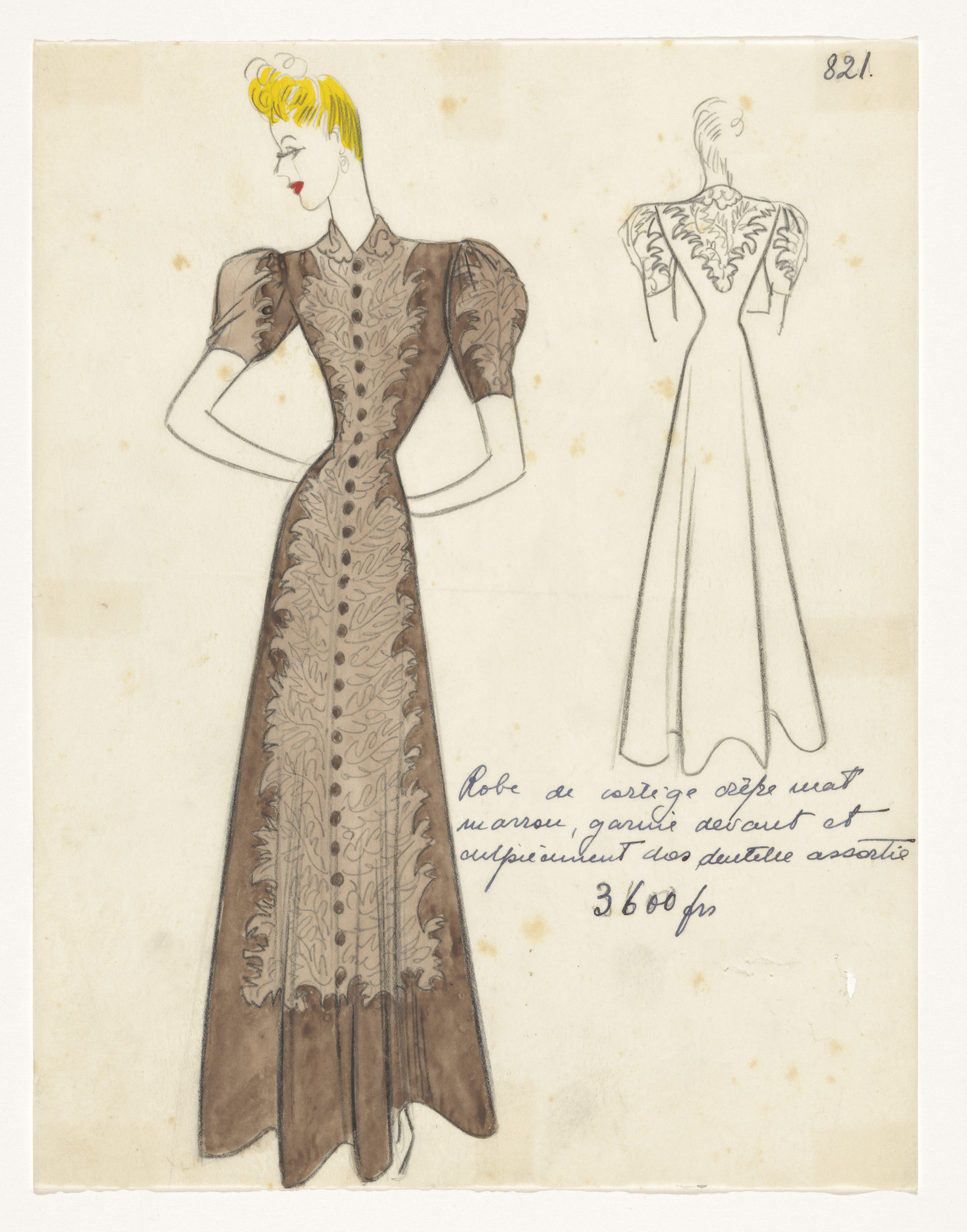
Brown crepe bridesmaid's dress with lace trim 1939

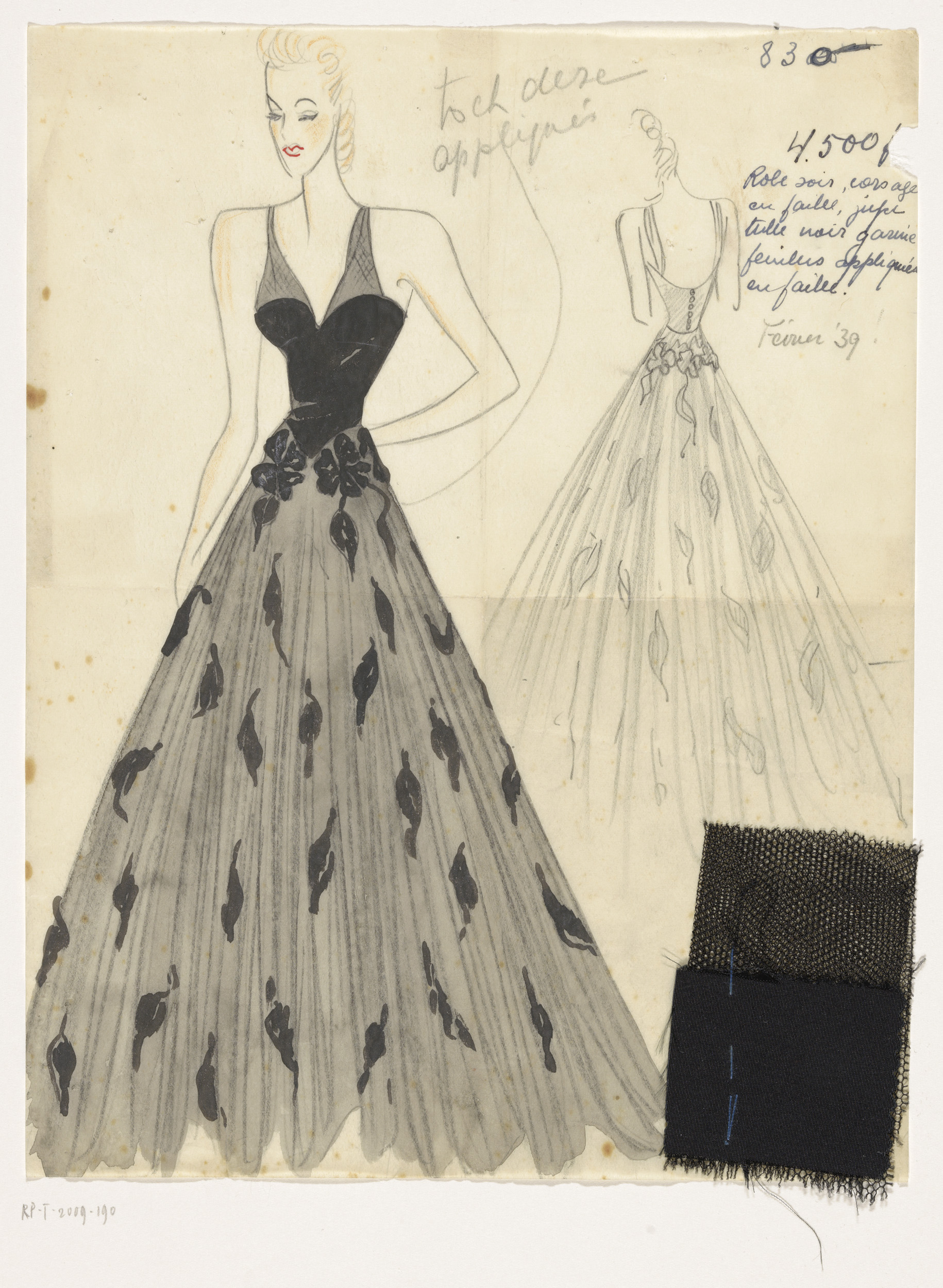
Black silk evening gown 1939

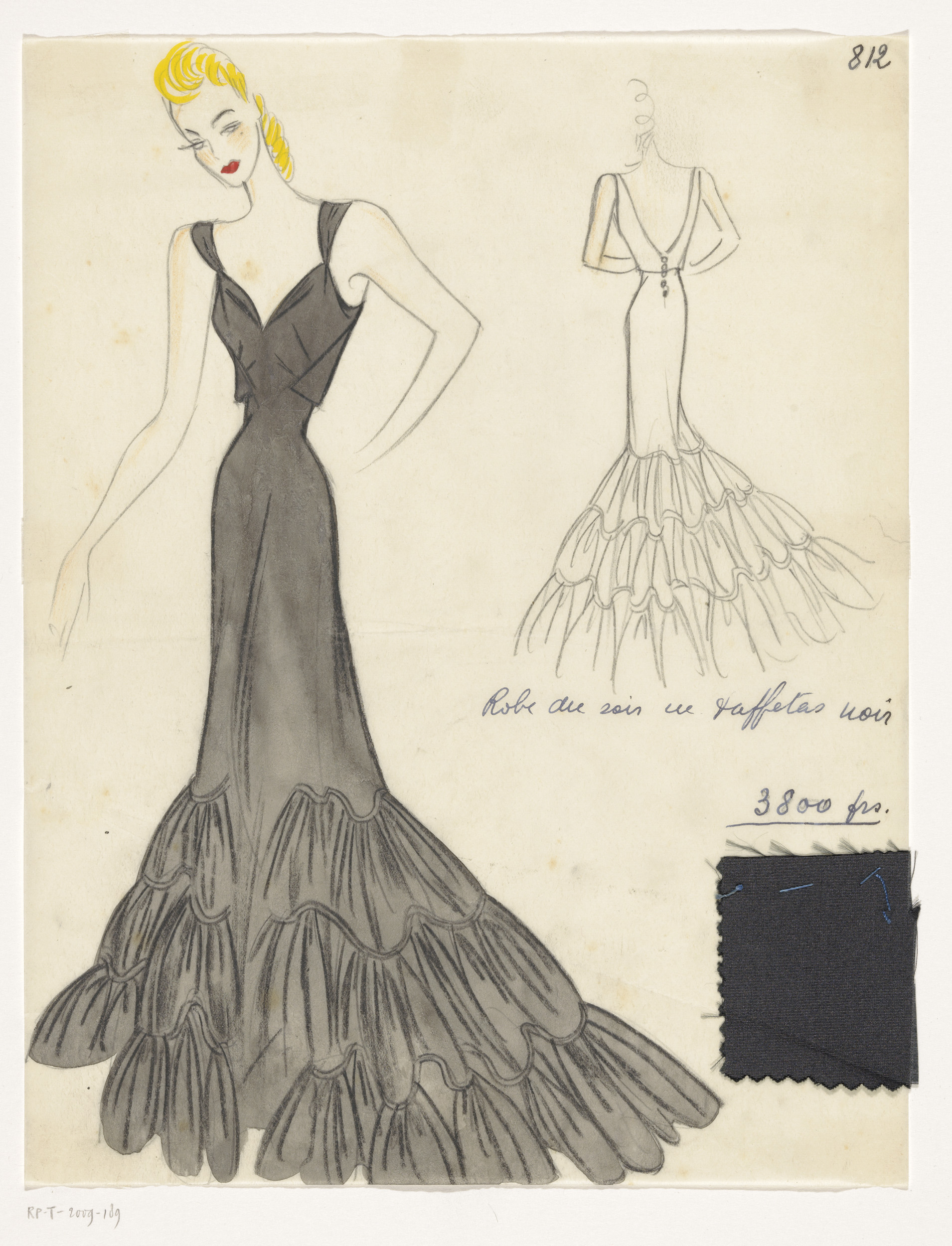
Black taffeta evening gown 1939

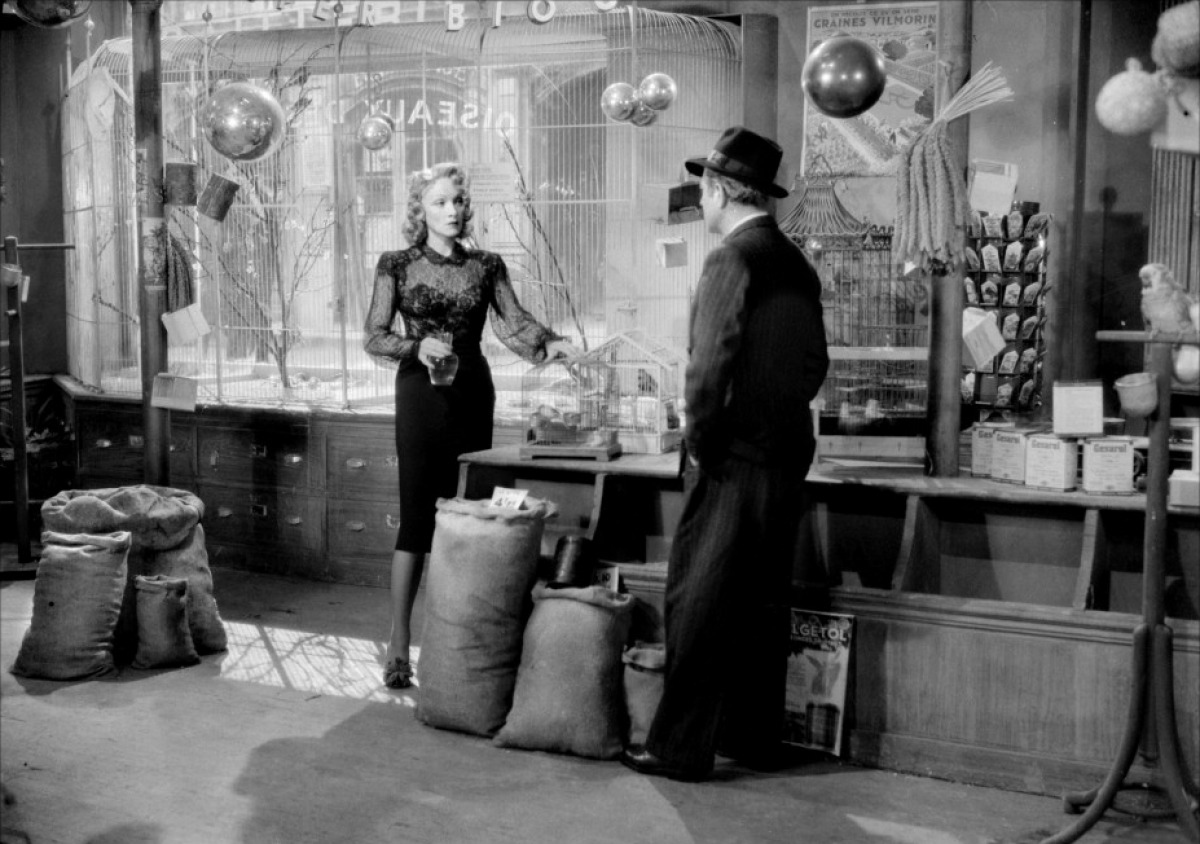
Marlene Dietrich in Martin Roumagnac 1946

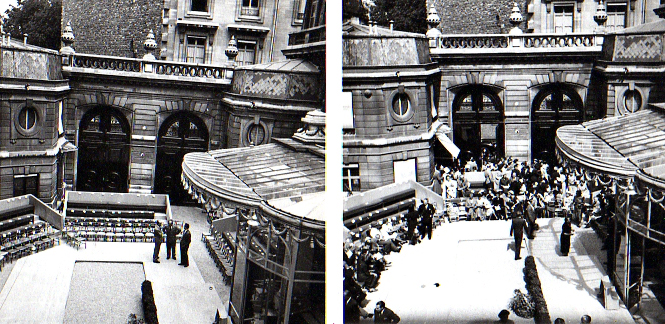
A fashion show in the courtyard of the rue Rabelais Salon

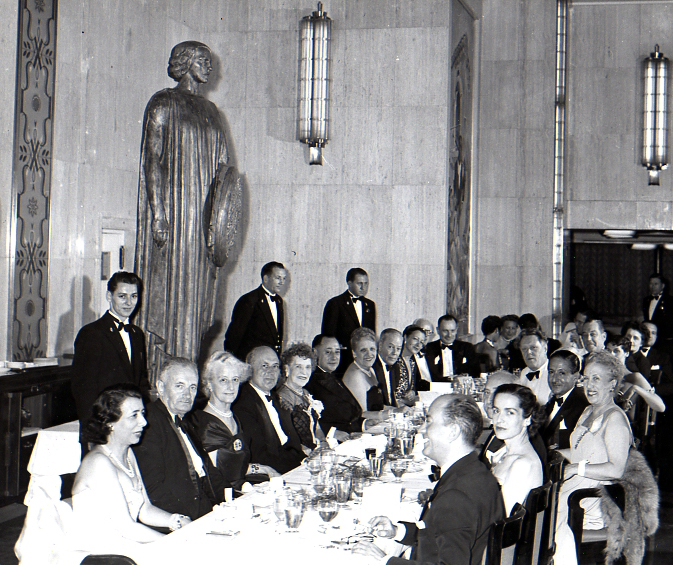
Dessès (front) at the Knickerbocker Club

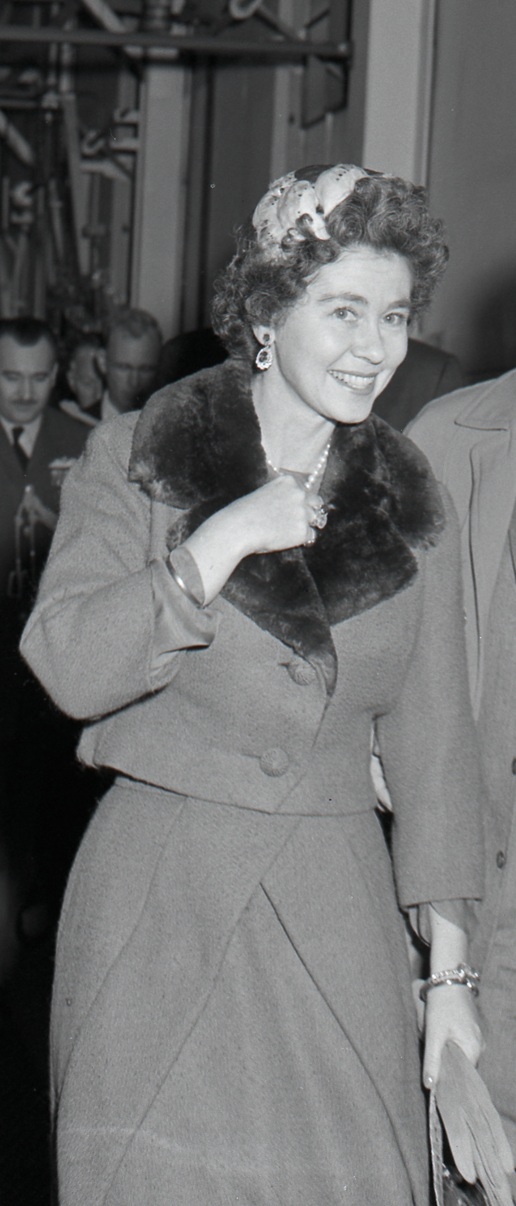
Queen Frederica in a Dessès suit

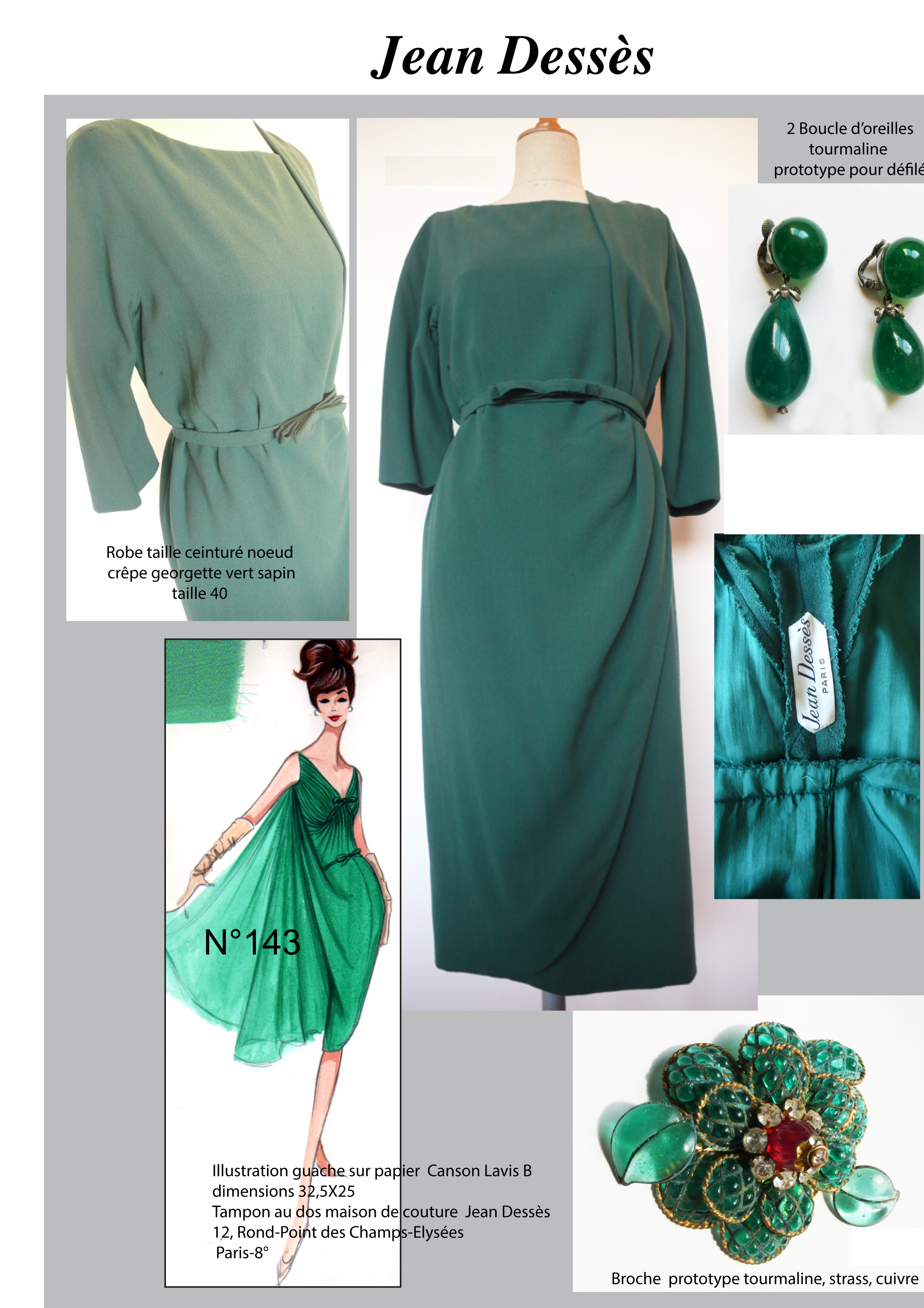
A sales sheet for Jean Dessès Diffusion

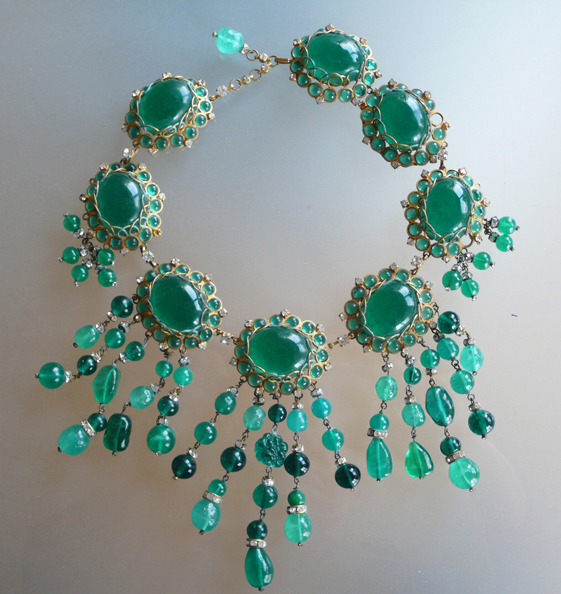
Beaded collar designed by Dessès and made by Roger Schémama

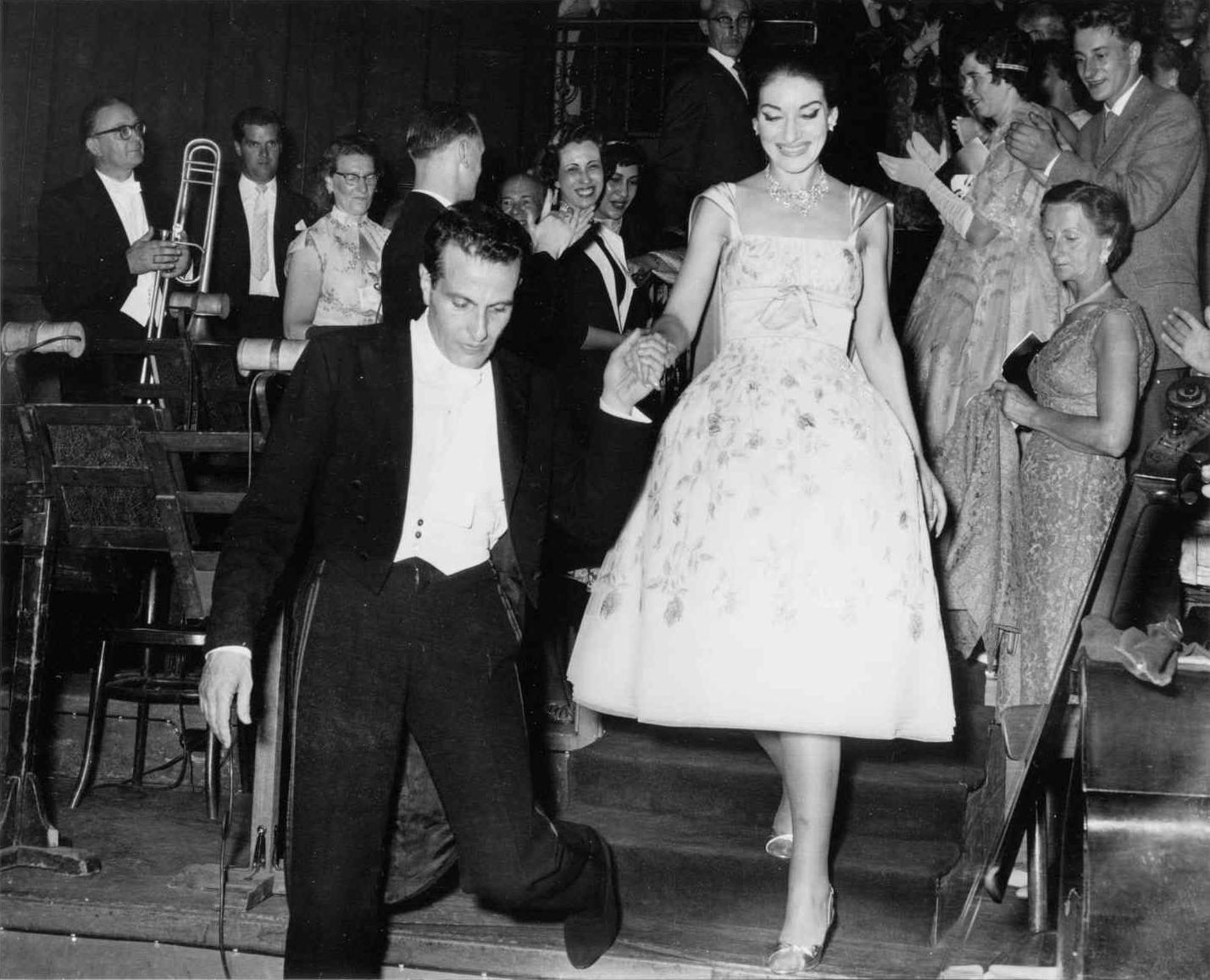
Maria Callas in Jean Dessès 1959

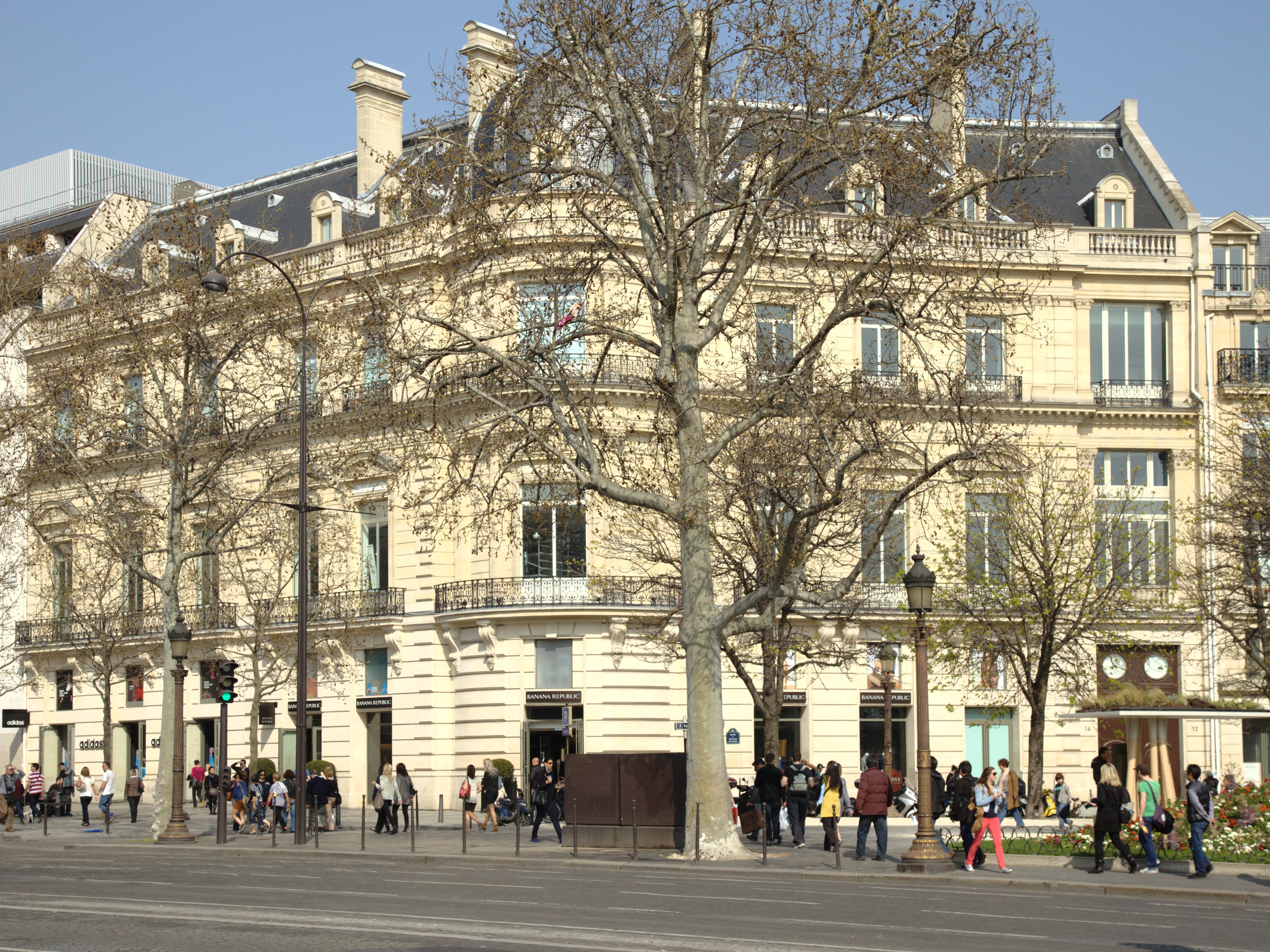
12, Rond Point de Champs Elysées
