= Benakis =

Benakis is a Greek surname. Notable people with the surname include:

- Anna Benaki-Psarouda (1934–2026), Greek lawyer and politician
- Antonis Benakis (1873–1954), Greek art collector
- Emmanouil Benakis (1843–1929), Greek merchant and politician
- Linos Benakis (1928–2022), Greek historian
- Panagiotis Benakis (c. 1700–1771), Greek freedom-fighter

== See also ==
- Benaki Museum
