= Fugitive in Saigon =

1957 film

- Directed by: Marcel Camus
- Written by: Michel Audiard; Marcel Camus
- Based on: Mort en fraude by Jean Hougron
- Produced by: Jean-Paul Guibert
- Starring: Daniel Gélin; Anne Méchard; Lucien Callamand
- Cinematography: Edmond Séchan
- Edited by: Jacqueline Thiédot
- Music by: Henri Crolla
- Production company: Intermondia Films
- Distributed by: Rank
- Release date: 17 May 1957
- Running time: 105 minutes
- Country: France
- Language: French

Fugitive in Saigon (French: Mort en fraude) is a 1957 French war drama film directed by Marcel Camus and starring Daniel Gélin, Anne Méchard and Lucien Callamand. It was shot on location in Cambodia. The film's sets were designed by the art director Paul-Louis Boutié. It was one of the first films to deal with France's defeat in the First Indochina War, along with Shock Patrol by Claude Bernard-Aubert.

== Synopsis ==
In 1950 Saigon Paul Horcier, a young Frenchman is on the run for currency trafficking. A Eurasian woman he meets takes him to shelter in a village in No man's land between the French forces and the Viet Minh. He grows to have enormous empathy with the locals and their poor living conditions. He ultimately lays down his life on their behalf.

== Cast ==
- Daniel Gélin as Paul Horcier
- Anne Méchard as Anh
- Lucien Callamand as Le chef de la police
- Jacques Chancel as The Vice President
- Dang Van Than as Grandfather
- Antoine Filidori as The Smuggler
- Be Thi Nam as The Mother
- Nguyen Phuong as The sister of the Village Headman
- Luong Van Vuong as The Man with Harmonica
- Tring Trac as The Village Headman
- Dang Van Nhan as Ty - brother of Anh

== Bibliography ==
- Williams, Alan. Republic of Images: A History of French Filmmaking. Harvard University Press, 1992.
