= Antonis Benakis =

Greek art collector (1873–1954)

- Born: 1873
- Died: 1954 (aged 80–81)
- Occupation: Art collector
- Known for: Founder of the Benaki Museum in Athens, Greece

Antonis Benakis (Greek: Αντώνης Μπενάκης) (1873–1954) was a Greek art collector and the founder of the Benaki Museum in Athens, Greece, the son of politician and magnate Emmanuel Benakis, the brother of author Penelope Delta and the uncle of the fashion designer Jean Dessès. He is the hero of Delta's book "Trellantonis" (Crazy Antony), a literary account of the sundry, mischievous adventures of children growing up in Alexandria, Egypt, in the early 20th century.

== Biography ==
Antonis Benakis was born in 1873 in Alexandria, in the Khedivate of Egypt, and was the son of businessman, politician and magnate Emmanuel Benakis and Chios born mother Virginia (née Choremi). He was a member of the Benakis and Choremi families and he grew up in the strict climate of the family home in Alexandria, about the daily life of which several testimonies are preserved through the books of his sister, Penelope Delta.

He moved permanently to Athens in 1926. It is certain that Antonis Benakis, the founder of the Benaki Museum, was influenced by the example of his father Emmanuel Benakis (1843–1929), and the great statesman Eleftherios Venizelos (1864–1936), a close friend and colleague.

During his own lifetime Benakis donated the museum that he created to the Greek state, now the Benaki Museum. Benakis pursued a continuous involvement, until his death, in enriching and improving the organization of the museum's holdings, and his role in ensuring its financial security.

Benakis was a member of the World Scout Committee of the World Organization of the Scout Movement from 1949 until 1951.
