= Eyes of Love (1959 film) =

1959 film

- Directed by: Denys de La Patellière
- Written by: Jacques Antoine (novel); Michel Audiard; Roland Laudenbach; Denys de La Patellière
- Produced by: Jacques Bernard-Levy; Louis Bernard-Levy; Bertrand Javal
- Starring: Danielle Darrieux; Jean-Claude Brialy; Françoise Rosay
- Cinematography: Pierre Petit
- Edited by: Georges Alépée
- Music by: Maurice Thiriet
- Production companies: Boréal Films; Les Films Pomereu; Serena Film
- Distributed by: Pathé Consortium Cinéma
- Release date: 25 November 1959
- Running time: 100 minutes
- Countries: France; Italy
- Language: French

Eyes of Love (French: Les yeux de l'amour) is a 1959 French-Italian romantic drama film directed by Denys de La Patellière and starring Danielle Darrieux, Jean-Claude Brialy and Françoise Rosay.

The film's sets were designed by the art director Paul-Louis Boutié.

== Synopsis ==
During the German occupation of World War II, an unmarried woman living with her domineering mother shelters a younger, blind man from the Germans and the two fall in love.

== Cast ==
- Danielle Darrieux as Jeanne Moncatel
- Jean-Claude Brialy as Pierre Ségur
- Françoise Rosay a Mme Moncatel
- Bernard Blier as Le docteur Andrieux
- André Reybaz as Le curé
- Eva Damien as Denise
- Louis Seigner as Le chirurgien
- Marie Mergey as La concierge
- Dominique Zardi as Un badaud à la gare
- Suzanne Nivette
- Pierre Vernier
- Nicole Desailly
- Gisèle Grimm

== Bibliography ==
- Dayna Oscherwitz & MaryEllen Higgins. The A to Z of French Cinema. Scarecrow Press, 2009.
