= Margo Lion (cabaret singer) =

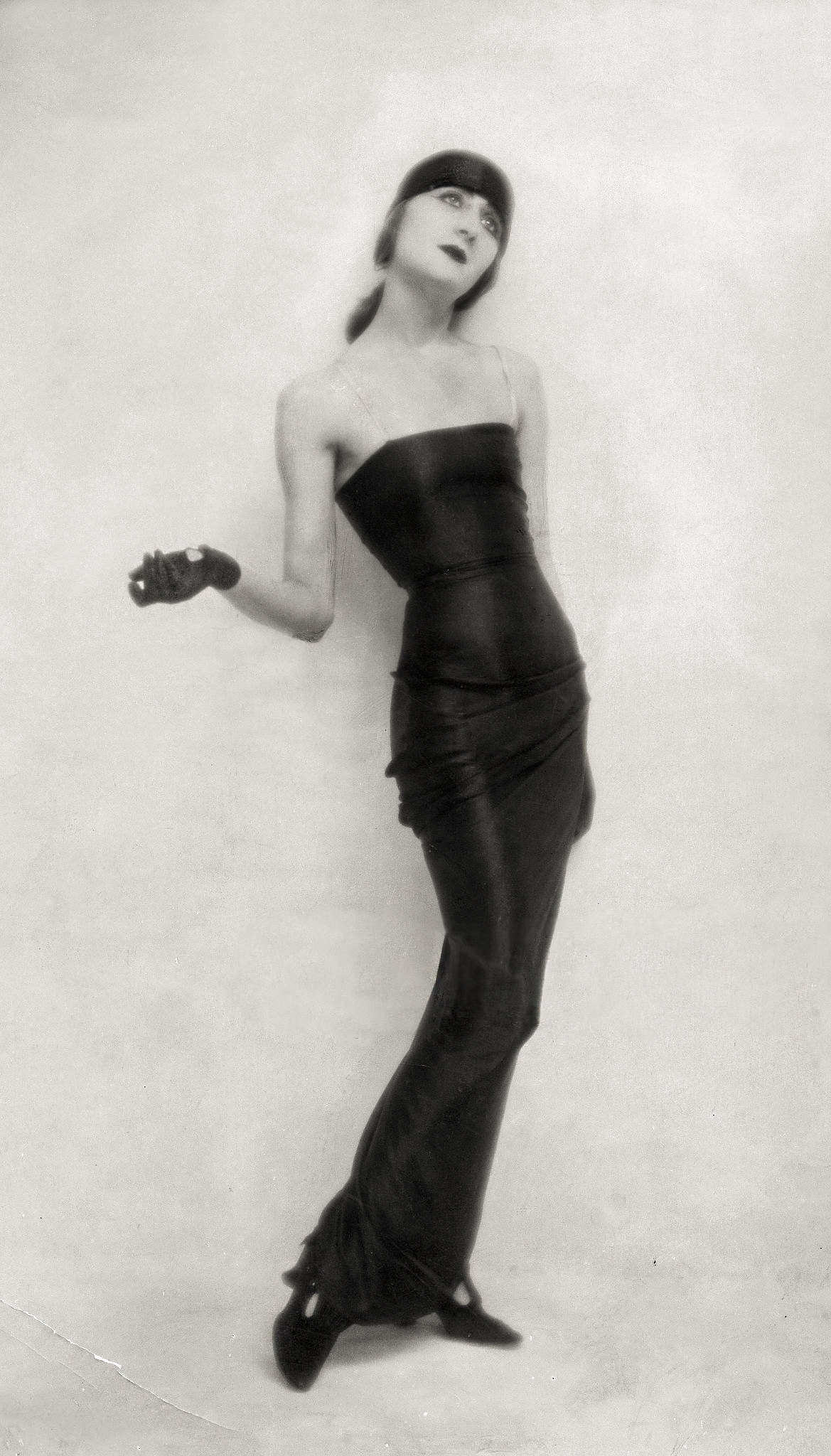
- Lion in 1923
- Born: Marguerite Hélène Barbe Elisabeth Constantine Lion; 28 February 1899; Constantinople
- Died: 24 February 1989 (aged 89); Paris
- Occupations: Chanteuse, actress
- Years active: 1921–1977
- Spouse: Marcellus Schiffer

Marguerite Hélène Barbe Elisabeth Constantine Lion (28 February 1899 – 24 February 1989), known as Margo Lion, was a Turkish-born French singer and actress.

Lion was born in Constantinople to a Jewish family during Ottoman rule. She moved to Berlin after World War I with her father to join the school of Russian ballet. She was a successful chanteuse, parodist, cabaret singer, and actress, best known for her role as Pirate Jenny in director G. W. Pabst's 1931 French-language adaptation of Bertolt Brecht and Kurt Weill's Threepenny Opera (Die Dreigroschenoper). In 1928, Lion and Dietrich sang a famous duet, "Wenn die beste Freundin mit der besten Freundin", a song which allegedly had lesbian overtones and which became a hit in Weimar Berlin prior to Dietrich's departure for Hollywood.

When the Nazi Party rose to power in 1933, she moved to France to avoid antisemitic persecution. Lion appeared in several French films until the early 1970s, including Docteur Françoise Gailland, L'Humeur Vagabonde, La Faute De L'Abbe Mouret, Le Petit Matin, Le Fou Du Labo, Julie La Rousse, and the 1946 French romantic melodrama Martin Roumagnac, which starred Marlene Dietrich.

== Death ==
Lion died in Paris in 1989, four days before her 90th birthday.

== Selected filmography ==
- Calais-Dover (1931)
- 24 Hours in the Life of a Woman (1931)
- The Trunks of Mr. O.F. (1931)
- I Go Out and You Stay Here (1931)
- The Big Attraction (1931)
- No More Love (1931)
- Narcotics (1932)
- The Magic Top Hat (1932)
- The Song of Night (1932)
- The Faceless Voice (1933)
- And Who Is Kissing Me? (1933)
- The Red Dancer (1937)
- Claudine at School (1937)
- The Man from Nowhere (1937)
- The Lafarge Case (1938)
- Martin Roumagnac (1946)
- Devil and the Angel (1946)
- One Night at the Tabarin (1947)
- The Dance of Death (1948)
- Woman Without a Past (1948)
- The Woman I Murdered (1948)
- Quay of Grenelle (1950)
- Ballerina (1950)
- The Lovers of Bras-Mort (1951)
- Flesh and the Woman (1954)
- La Famille Anodin (1956)
- Guilty? (1956)
- Julie the Redhead (1959)
- Lola (1961)
- Nick Carter va tout casser (1964)
- Coplan Takes Risks (1964)
