= I'll Get Back to Kandara =

1956 film

- Directed by: Victor Vicas
- Written by: Jacques Companéez; Jean Hougron (novel); Alex Joffé; Victor Vicas
- Produced by: Paul Temps
- Starring: François Périer; Daniel Gélin; Bella Darvi
- Cinematography: Pierre Montazel
- Edited by: Jean Feyte
- Music by: Joseph Kosma
- Production company: Jad Films
- Distributed by: Twentieth Century Fox
- Release date: 20 December 1956
- Running time: 95 minutes
- Country: France
- Language: French

I'll Get Back to Kandara (French: Je reviendrai à Kandara) is a 1956 French drama film directed by Victor Vicas and starring François Périer, Daniel Gélin and Bella Darvi. It is an adaptation from the 1955 novel by French writer Jean Hougron.

The film's art direction was by Raymond Gabutti.

== Cast ==
- François Périer as André Barret
- Daniel Gélin as Bernard Cormière
- Bella Darvi as Pascale Barret
- Jean Brochard as Le juge d'instruction
- Julien Carette as Grindel
- André Valmy as Rudeau
- Julien Verdier as Lachaume
- Guy Tréjan as Pélissier
- François Darbon as Le commissaire
- Madeleine Barbulée as Madame Lachaume
- Gisèle Grimm as Henriette
- Colette Régis as Madame Bergamier - la belle-mère
- Edmond Ardisson as Le buraliste
- Claude Carrère as L'interne
- Max Dalban as Le porteur de journaux
- Robert Dalban as Cardelec
- Émile Genevois as Le garçon de café
- Marcel Pérès as L'agent
- Léon Larive as L'employé de la consigne
- Susi Jera as Josette
- René Alié
- Claudine Bleuse
- Claude Bouillaud as Ravaud
- Claudy Chapeland
- Henri Coutet
- Patrick Dewaere as Le petit garçon
- Édouard Francomme
- Lucien Guervil
- René Hell
- Robert Le Fort as L'ouvrier au commissariat
- Héléna Manson
- Yves-Marie Maurin as Un élève
- Daniel Mendaille
- Jacques Monod
- Louise Nowa
- Jean Olivier
- Marcel Rouzé
- Louis Saintève
- Roger Vincent
- Suzy Willy

== Bibliography ==
- Rège, Philippe. Encyclopedia of French Film Directors, Volume 1. Scarecrow Press, 2009.
