= Marcelle Dormoy =

French fashion designer (1895–1981)

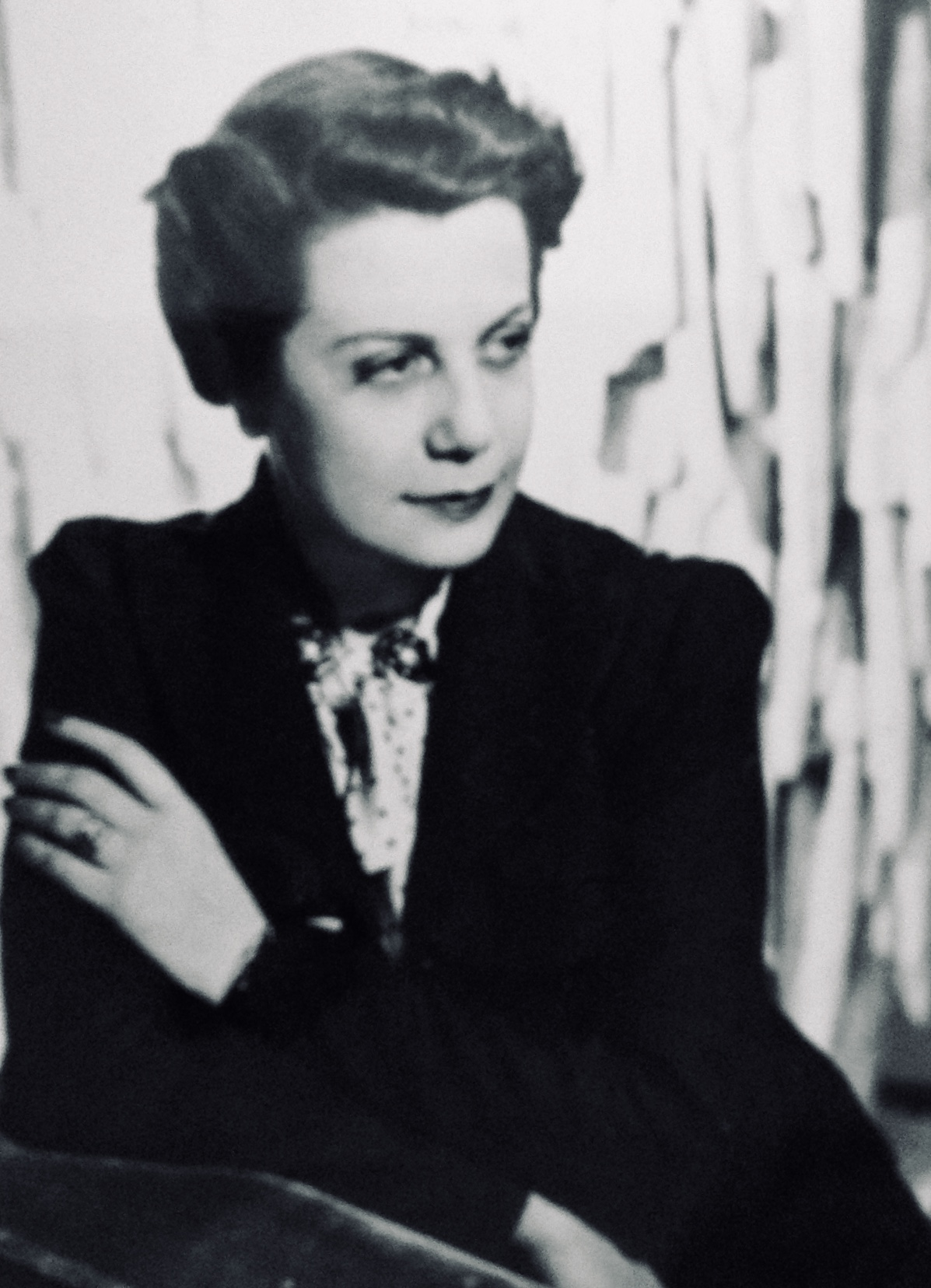
- Born: Marie-Léonie Graftieaux; August 16, 1895; Deville, Ardennes, France
- Died: September 9, 1981 (aged 86); Deville, Ardennes, France
- Known for: Fashion design, haute couture

Signature
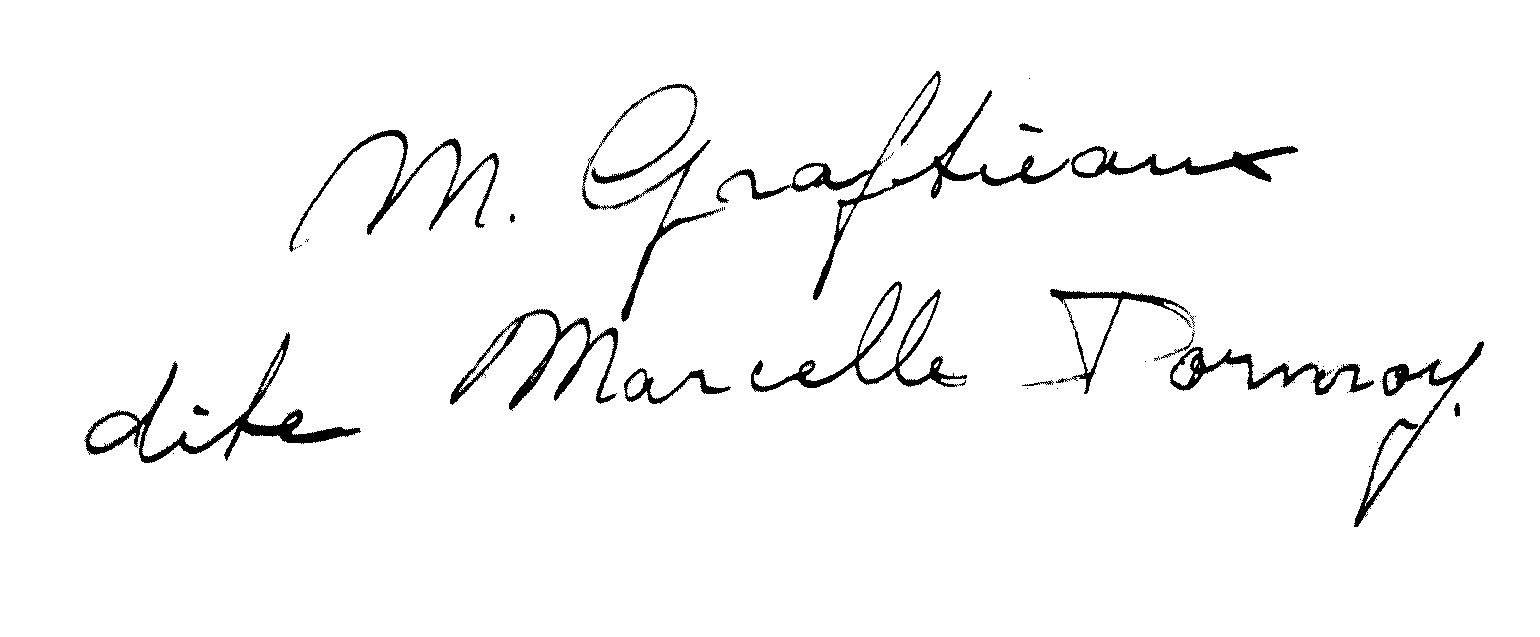

Marcelle Dormoy (16 August 1895–9 September 1981) was a prominent French fashion designer, active from the 1912 to 1963.

== Biography ==
Dormoy was born Marie-Léonie Graftieaux, the eldest child of Alexis Léon Graftieaux and Marie Catherine Echard. The family was from the tiny village of Deville, in northeastern France. As a child, her parents sent her to Paris, to live with her paternal grandparents, the Dormoys. She became friends with the daughters of the couturier Paul Poiret. When they visited his atelier, Marie-Léonie became interested in fashion and, when she was just 12, she began working part-time for Poiret, doing odd jobs in the workroom. By the time she finished school, she was one of his models. She had also learned a considerable amount about clothing design and construction—enough that, when Madeleine Vionnet opened her fashion house in 1912, she hired Marie-Léonie as a seamstress. With the advent of World War I in 1914, Vionnet closed her salon.

Dormoy returned to Deville where, in 1916, she gave birth to an illegitimate son, Pierre-Edouard Graftieaux; Dormoy said that she had had a brief affair with a traveling salesman and his identity was not revealed. In 2019, her grandson wrote a book, claiming that his grandfather was Edward, Prince of Wales. This has not been proven to be true.

When Vionnet re-opened in 1918, Dormoy returned to Paris, became Vionnet's première d'atelier (head seamstress) and began using the name 'Marcelle Dormoy'. In 1933, Dormoy left Vionnet to launch her own couture house, at 22 Rue de la Trémoille near the Champs-Élysées, From Vionnet, Dormoy learned the technique of the bias-cut dress, draped over the body, which allowed the dress to flow rather than restrict. Her designs were simple, elegant and comfortable, with free-flowing lines and little ornamentation. She quickly developed a large roster of devoted clients, and became a supplier to the New York department store Bonwit Teller, which had opened a 'Salon de Couture'. The store purchased several of her designs for copying and manufacture in the US before, during, and after the war; this type of business allowed Dormoy to stay open during the war, when so many couturiers had to close.

Dormoy did not just design dresses. She advertised herself as a designer of couture, furs, knitwear, lingerie and sportswear. She quickly gained an excellent reputation; in 1935, the New York Times included her in coverage of the "end-of-day" dresses showing in Paris, noting that she favoured mauve, powder pink and turquoise. In 1937, the artist Marie Laurencin painted her portrait in exchange for a fur coat. In 1934, one of her scarves appeared in Vogue; in 1937, Horst photographed one of her dresses for Vogue and, in 1939, the magazine printed a drawing of one of her gowns. After the war, she was included in the Chambre Syndicale de la Haute Couture's Schedule of Paris Couture Openings; as was the case with most couturiers, she now favored understated, more sombre, elegance.

During the war, she designed the costumes for three films, dressing Grace Moore in Louise (1939), Elvira Popescu and Micheline Presle in Paradise Lost (1940) and Edwige Feuillère in The Honourable Catherine (1943). She would design costumes for two further films, dressing Annabella in The Man Who Returns from Afar (1950) and Maria Mauban in Pas de week-end pour notre amour (1950). She was also one of the designers included in the Théâtre de la Mode, a 1946 traveling exhibition of fashion dolls intended to promote French fashion.

While she was working for Vionnet, Dormoy began creating perfume: between 1920 and 1927, she created Fleurs du jardin, Embrasse, Fleurs Naturelle, Triomphe, Deux lèvres, Vers le Joie and Violette. During the war, she returned to perfumes, creating Coloris, Fleurs du jardin, Perfidie, Lilas, Frasques, Sodome and Gomorrhe. The names of the latter were inspired by the 1943 play Sodome et Gomorrhe, starring one of Dormoy's best customers, Edwige Feuillère. Here, Dormoy was a pioneer. Stating that "the perfume elects the woman", she created fragrances to complement the style and personalities of the women wearing them. Her philosophy of fragrance as an extension of personal identity profoundly influenced the fusion of fashion and scent for future designers. (In 2019, a French company licensed Dormoy's name to create four new fragrances; the venture was short-lived.)

Dormoy closed her house in 1950 and moved, with most of her staff, to the house of Jean Dessès, where she became his production manager and a trusted aide, traveling with him to the US and handling the minutiae of his business during its expansion. She stayed with Dessès until he closed his house in 1963, when she retired. She returned to Deville and died there in 1981.
