= Julie the Redhead =

1959 film

- Directed by: Claude Boissol
- Written by: Paul Andréota; Claude Boissol
- Produced by: Georges Glass
- Starring: Daniel Gélin; Pascale Petit; Margo Lion
- Cinematography: Roger Fellous
- Edited by: Louis Devaivre
- Music by: René-Louis Lafforgue
- Production company: Films Matignon
- Distributed by: Pathé Consortium Cinéma
- Release date: 12 August 1959
- Running time: 100 minutes
- Country: France
- Language: French

Julie the Redhead (French: Julie la rousse) is a 1959 French comedy film directed by Claude Boissol and starring Daniel Gélin, Pascale Petit and Margo Lion. The film's sets were designed by the art director Robert Guisgand.

== Cast ==
- Daniel Gélin as Édouard Lavigne / Jean Lavigne
- Pascale Petit as Julienne Lefebvre / Sa nièce
- Margo Lion as Germaine Lavigne, la mère de Jean
- René Blancard as M. Lavigne, le père d'Édouard
- Liliane Patrick as Tamira
- Michel Etcheverry as Le notaire / Notary
- Gabrielle Fontan as Mme Michon, la concierge
- Jean Ozenne as L'oncle Roger / Uncle Roger
- Frédéric O'Brady as Hamib, l'homme d'affaires
- Pierre Doris as L'hôtelier / Hotel Manager
- André Thorent as José
- Jocelyne Darche as Violette
- Louis Viret as Le garagiste
- Philippe March as Un invité à la soirée
- Michel as Le costaud du cirque
- Jacques Dufilho as Le garçon d'hôtel / Waiter
- René-Louis Lafforgue as Max Piccalo
- Irina Demick as Minor role

== Bibliography ==
- Katz, Ephraim. The Film Encyclopedia. Crowell, 1979.
