= Daniel Gélin =

French actor (1921–2002)

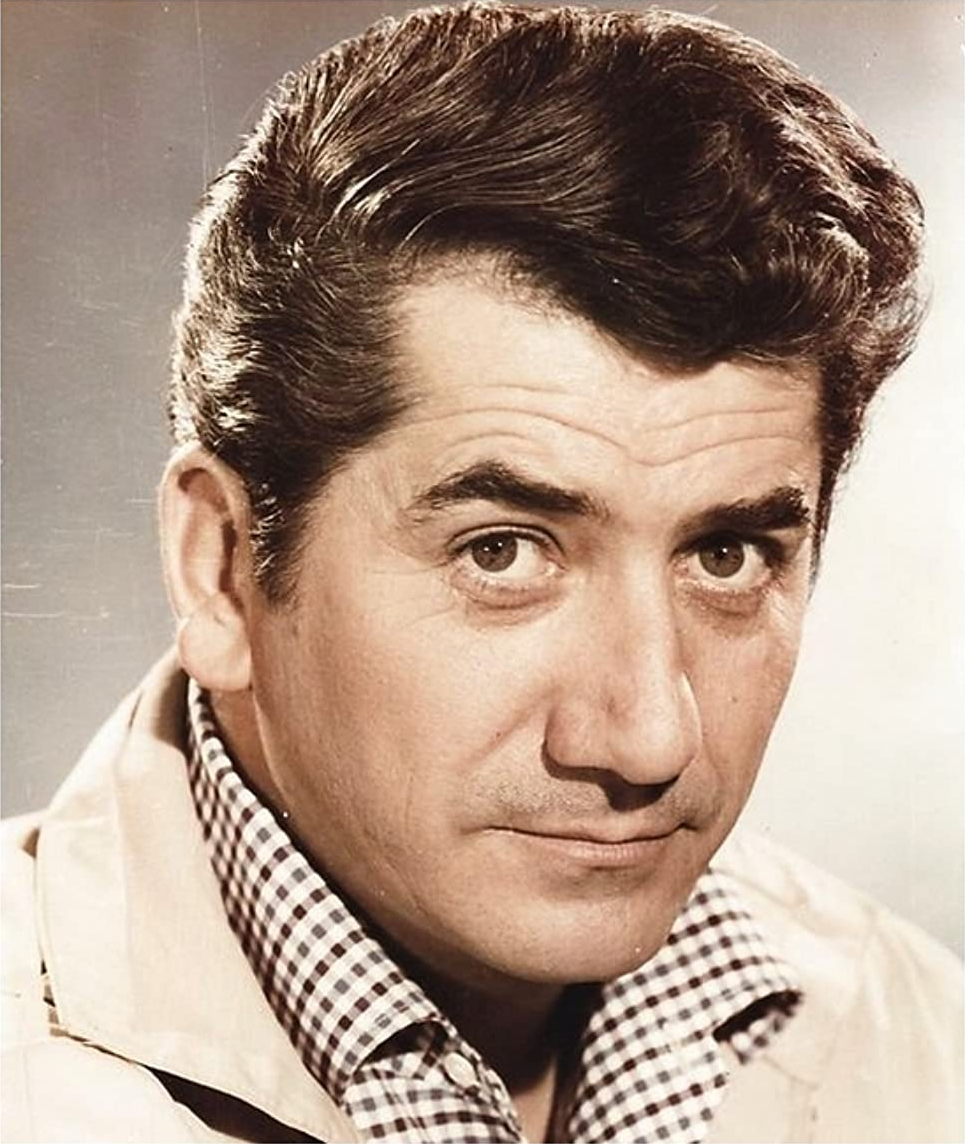
- Gélin in 1963
- Born: Daniel Yves Alfred Gélin; 19 May 1921; Angers, Maine-et-Loire, France
- Died: 29 November 2002 (aged 81); Paris, France
- Years active: 1940–2002
- Spouses: Danièle Delorme (m. 1946; div. 1954) Sylvie Hirsh (m. 1954; div. 1968) Lydie Zaks (m. 1973)
- Children: 6, including Xavier Gélin, Maria Schneider and Fiona Gélin

Daniel Yves Alfred Gélin (19 May 1921 – 29 November 2002) was a French film and television actor.

== Early life ==
Gélin was born in Angers, Maine-et-Loire, the son of Yvonne (née Le Méner) and Alfred Ernest Joseph Gélin.

When he was ten, his family moved to Saint-Malo where Daniel went to college until he was expelled for 'uncouthness'. His father then found him a job in a shop that sold cans of salted cod. It was seeing the shooting of Marc Allégret's film Entrée des artistes that triggered his desire to go to Paris to train to be an actor. He trained at the Cours Simon in Paris before entering the Conservatoire national supérieur d'art dramatique . There he met Louis Jouvet and embarked on a theatrical career. He made his first film appearance in 1940 in Miquette and for several years was an extra or played small roles in French films. He appeared with Jean Gabin and Marlene Dietrich in Martin Roumagnac (1946).

== Career ==
He won his first leading role in Rendez-vous de juillet (1949). From that time, he went on to appear in more than 150 films, including Max Ophüls' films La Ronde (1950) and Le Plaisir (1952), Jacques Becker's Édouard et Caroline (1951), Sacha Guitry's films Si Versailles m'était conté (Royal Affairs in Versailles) (1954) and Napoléon (1955), Alfred Hitchcock's The Man Who Knew Too Much (1956), Jean Cocteau's Le Testament d'Orphée (1960), Le souffle au cœur (Murmur of the Heart) (1971), and La Nuit de Varennes (That Night in Varennes) (1982). He also wrote and directed one film, The Long Teeth, in 1952.

Gélin was a leading man in French cinema during the 1950s, but his career declined with the coming of the New Wave. He worked in theater for several years, but later found new success on screen as a character actor. He appeared extensively in French films and television productions from the 1970s until his death, often playing cynical characters or grumpy old men.

== Personal life ==
In 1946, Gélin married actress Danièle Delorme with whom he had a son, actor, director and producer Xavier Gélin. They divorced in 1954. While still married to Delorme, he had an affair with 17-year-old model Marie Christine Schneider that produced a daughter, Maria Schneider. Due to his status as a married man, Gélin could not recognize Maria as his daughter. He visited the child several times but eventually severed his relationship with her mother. Maria Schneider and Daniel Gélin reconnected when she was sixteen and came to visit him. They remained in contact, although their relationship was irregular.

Gélin was married to model Sylvie Hirsch from 1954 until their divorce in 1968. This marriage produced three children: Pascal (who died aged one year), Fiona, and Manuel, the latter two also becoming actors. In 1973, he married Lydie Zaks, with whom he had a daughter, Laura.

== Death ==
Gélin died in Paris on 29 November 2002 of kidney failure.

== Filmography ==
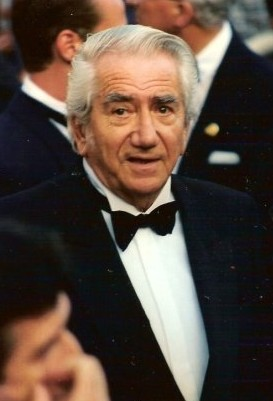
Gélin at the 1996 Cannes Film Festival

Year	Title	Role	Director	Notes
1940	Miquette		Jean Boyer	
1940	Radio Surprises		Marcel Aboulker	Uncredited
1941	Premier rendez-vous	Monsieur Chauveau-Laplace	Henri Decoin	Uncredited
1942	The Strangers in the House		Henri Decoin	Uncredited
1942	Soyez les bienvenus		Jacques de Baroncelli	
1942	The Murderer Lives at Number 21	Policeman	Henri-Georges Clouzot	Uncredited
1943	Lucrèce	Un collégien	Léo Joannon	
1944	Les Petites du quai aux fleurs		Marc Allégret	Uncredited
1945	Les Cadets de l'océan	Philippe Dermantes	Jean Dréville	
1946	The Temptation of Barbizon	Michel	Jean Stelli	
1946	A Friend Will Come Tonight	Pierre Ribault	Raymond Bernard	
1946	Martin Roumagnac	Le surveillant du collège – épris de Blanche	Georges Lacombe	
1946	Ouvert pour cause d'inventaire		Alain Resnais	
1947	Sybille's Night	Stany	Jean-Paul Paulin	
1947	Mirror	Charles Lussac	Raymond Lamy	
1947	The Woman in Red	Saladin	Louis Cuny	
1948	The Murdered Model	Léopold	Pierre de Hérain	
1949	Le Paradis des pilotes perdus	Lieutenant Villeneuve	Georges Lampin	
1949	Rendezvous in July	Lucien Bonnard	Jacques Becker	
1950	La Ronde	Alfred	Max Ophüls	
1950	God Needs Men	Joseph Le Berre	Jean Delannoy	
1951	Edward and Caroline	Édouard Mortier	Jacques Becker	
1951	Dirty Hands	Hugo Barine	Fernand Rivers, Simone Berriau	
1951	Young Love	Jean Bompart	Guy Lefranc	
1951	Traité de bave et d'éternité	Himself	Isidore Isou	
1952	Le Plaisir	Jean, the young painter	Max Ophüls	(segment "Le Modèle")
1952	Adorables Créatures	André Noblet	Christian-Jaque	
1952	La Minute de vérité	Daniel Prévost	Jean Delannoy	
1953	The Long Teeth	Louis Commandeur	Himself	
1953	Rue de l'Estrapade	Robert	Jacques Becker	
1953	Voice of Silence	Andrea Sanna / L'ancien prisonnier	Georg Wilhelm Pabst	
1953	The Slave	Michel Landa	Yves Ciampi	
1954	Royal Affairs in Versailles	Jean Collinet	Sacha Guitry	
1954	Stain in the Snow	Frank Friedmayer	Luis Saslavsky	
1954	Public Opinion	Paolo Jaier	Maurizio Corgnati and Goffredo Alessandrini	
1954	Love in a Hot Climate	Ricardo Garcia	Georges Rouquier and Munoz Suay	
1954	On Trial (L'affaire Maurizius)	Léonard Maurizius	Julien Duvivier	
1954	The Cheerful Squadron	Il soldato Frédéric d'Héricourt	Paolo Moffa	
1954	Woman of Rome	Mino	Luigi Zampa	
1955	The Lovers of Lisbon	Pierre Roubier	Henri Verneuil	
1955	Napoléon	Napoleon (as a young man)	Sacha Guitry	
1956	Maid in Paris	Antoine du Merlet	Pierre Gaspard-Huit	
1956	The Man Who Knew Too Much	Louis Bernard	Alfred Hitchcock	
1956	Plucking the Daisy	Daniel Roy	Marc Allégret	
1956	Bonsoir Paris, bonjour l'amour	Georges Bernier	Ralph Baum	
1956	I'll Get Back to Kandara	Bernard Cormière	Victor Vicas	
1957	Fugitive in Saigon	Paul Horcier	Marcel Camus	
1957	Three Days to Live	Simon Belin	Gilles Grangier	
1957	Retour de manivelle	Robert Montillon	Denys de La Patellière	
1957	Charming Boys	Alain Cartier	Henri Decoin	
1958	The Daughter of Hamburg	Pierre	Yves Allégret	
1958	Suivez-moi jeune homme	Michel Corbier	Guy Lefranc	
1959	Ce corps tant désiré	Guillaume Féraud	Luis Saslavsky	
1959	Julie the Redhead	Édouard Lavigne / Jean Lavigne	Claude Boissol	
1960	Carthage in Flames	Phégor	Carmine Gallone	
1960	Testament of Orpheus	L'interne / The intern	Jean Cocteau	Uncredited
1960	Le tre eccetera del colonnello	Lieutenant Villard	Claude Boissol	
1961	La Proie pour l'ombre	Eric Kraemmer	Alexandre Astruc	
1961	The Season for Love	Jacques Saint-Ford	Pierre Kast	
1961	Dans la gueule du loup	Un drogué	Jean-Charles Dudrumet	
1961	Reveille-toi chérie	Masure	Claude Magnier	
1962	Girl on the Road	Le comédien	Jacqueline Audry	
1962	The Longest Day	Minor Role	Ken Annakin	(French Version) (scenes deleted)
1963	Règlements de compte	Nicky	Pierre Chevalier	
1963	Portuguese Vacation	Daniel	Pierre Kast	
1963	Three Girls in Paris	Raymond	Gabriel Axel	
1964	La Bonne Soupe	Raymond	Robert Thomas	
1964	Cherchez l'idole	Un invité au spectacle de Sylvie Vartan	Michel Boisrond	Uncredited
1965	The Sleeping Car Murders	the veterinary	Constantin Costa-Gavras	Uncredited
1965	The Hour of Truth	David	Henri Calef	
1966	Witness Out of Hell	Bora Petrović	Žika Mitrović	
1966	Two Girls from the Red Star	Ballard	Sammy Drechsel	
1966	The Sultans	Léo	Jean Delannoy	
1966	Line of Demarcation	Doctor Jacques Lafaye	Claude Chabrol	
1966	Living It Up	Bernard	Pierre Gaspard-Huit	
1966	Is Paris Burning?	Yves Bayet	René Clément	
1966	Black Sun	Guy Rodier	Denys de La Patellière	
1968	La Trêve	Arno	Claude Guillemot	
1968	The Most Beautiful Month	Le capitaine du Génie	Guy Blanc	
1969	Slogan	Evelyne's father	Pierre Grimblat	
1969	Hallucinations sadiques	Charles	Jean-Pierre Bastid	
1969	Détruire, dit-elle	Bernard Alione	Marguerite Duras	
1970	La servante	Dr. Robert Marbois	Jacques-Paul Bertrand	
1971	Murmur of the Heart	Charles Chevalier	Louis Malle	
1971	Swedish Fly Girls	André	Jack O'Connell	
1972	Aimez-vous les uns les autres... mais pas trop	Paul Roccard	Daniel Moosmann	
1972	Far from Dallas	Jean	Philippe Toledano	
1973	The Police Serve the Citizens?	Brera	Romolo Guerrieri	
1974	Un linceul n'a pas de poches	Laurence	Jean-Pierre Mocky	
1974	Ariane	Le comédien	Pierre-Jean de San Bartolomé	
1975	Dialogues of Exiles	-	Raoul Ruiz	
1975	Trop c'est trop	Un flic	Didier Kaminka	
1977	Nous irons tous au paradis	Bastien	Yves Robert	
1977	Urgent ou À quoi bon exécuter des projets puisque le projet est en lui-même une jouissance suffisante	Himself		
1978	L'honorable société	Max de Marcilly	Anielle Weinberger	
1978	The Suspended Vocation	Malagrida	Raoul Ruiz	
1979	Qu'il est joli garçon l'assassin de papa	Don Gomez	Michel Caputo	
1980	L'oeil du maître	Samuel	Stéphane Kurc	
1981	Signé Furax	Broutechoux	Marc Simenon	
1981	Peacetime in Paris	Gérard Courant	Predrag Golubovic	
1982	Guy de Maupassant	Gustave	Michel Drach	
1982	That Night in Varennes	Monsieur de Wendel	Ettore Scola	
1985	Les Enfants	Enrico	Marguerite Duras	
1986	Killing Cars	Kellermann	Michael Verhoeven	
1987	Via Monte Napoleone	Elena's father	Carlo Vanzina	
1987	Sécurité publique	Martino Morando	Gabriel Benattar	
1988	Dandin	Monsieur de Sotenville	Roger Planchon	
1988	Life Is a Long Quiet River	Le docteur Mavial	Étienne Chatiliez	
1988	Itinéraire d'un enfant gâté	Pierrot Duvivier	Claude Lelouch	
1990	Mister Frost	Simon Scolari	Philippe Setbon	
1990	Promotion canapé	Le responsable des Inspecteurs Justice	Didier Kaminka	
1991	Mauvaise Fille	Fernand	Régis Franc	
1991	Les secrets professionnels du Dr Apfelglück	Roland Grumaud	Alessandro Capone	
1991	Un type bien	Docteur Avril	Laurent Bénégui	
1992	Les Eaux dormantes	Le docteur Nedelec	Jacques Tréfouel	
1993	Coup de jeune	Gaudeamus à 70 ans	Xavier Gélin	
1993	De force avec d'autres	L'autre lui-même	Simon Reggiani	
1993	Roulez jeunesse !	Jean Moulinier	Jacques Fansten	
1993	Les Marmottes	Léo	Élie Chouraqui	
1993	Les Ténors	Maître Léon Montlucet	Francis de Gueltzl	
1994	Des feux mal éteints	Le monsieur de la plage	Serge Moati	
1994	La Cité de la peur	Monsieur Mireille	Alain Berbérian	
1994	Pushing the Limits	Himself	Thierry Donard	
1995	Fugueuses	Bruno	Nadine Trintignant	
1996	Fantôme avec chauffeur	Le passeur	Gérard Oury	
1996	Les Bidochon	Le père Bidochon	Serge Korber	
1996	Hommes, femmes, mode d'emploi	the widower	Claude Lelouch	
1997	Obsession	Xavier Fabre	Peter Sehr	
