= Gisèle Grimm =

French actress (born 1929)

- Born: Gisèle Paule Klavatz; March 31, 1929 (age 96); Paris, France
- Occupation: Actress
- Years active: 1956–1998
- Children: 1 (deceased)

Gisèle Grimm (née Gisèle Paule Klavatz, born 31 March 1929) is a French actress who has appeared in French films since 1950s.

== Life ==
Grimm was born on 31 March 1929 in Paris into a modest family. Her father was an ironworker, in 1938 he started work in a factory, while her mother was a nurse at the hospital.

She finished her studies at the age of 17 with an elementary certificate, with a complementary course. Faced with the need to quickly learn a trade, she began working as a secretary and, within a year, was promoted to the position of shorthand typist at Maritime Messengers in Paris. Dissatisfied with the monotony of her life and her low salary, she improved her English and, after passing a relatively easy competitive exam, was hired by the United Nations, prompting her move to New York. She remained there for two and a half years, during which she joined an amateur theatre group in Greenwich Village during her spare time. She also managed to save enough money to attend classes with René Simon upon her return to Paris.

== Career ==
She began her career as an intermittent theatre performer in 1954, performing under the name Gisèle Clavart with the Baret touring company in Occupe-toi d'Amélie by Georges Feydeau, directed by Roland Piétri. She later adopted the stage name Gisèle Grimm and became active in boulevard theatre, appearing in works by playwrights such as Jean de Létraz and Marc Camoletti. She also performed in plays by Eugène Labiche (Le Prix Martin, directed by Serge Bourrier), Tristan Bernard (La Petite Femme de Loth, directed by Georges Vitaly), and Sacha Guitry (Faisons un rêve, on tour with Robert Lamoureux). Over the course of her stage career, she acted in around twenty plays, continuing until 1996–1997, including a notable performance in Oscar by Claude Magnier, directed by Pierre Mondy.

Simultaneously, Grimm appeared in numerous supporting roles in French cinema. Her film credits include Cigarettes, Whisky et P’tites Pépées alongside Annie Cordy, Archimède le clochard with Jean Gabin, with Jean-Paul Belmondo, La Provinciale with Nathalie Baye, and Les Galettes de Pont-Aven, in which she portrayed the wife of Jean-Pierre Marielle.

She was also active on television, often cast as elegant aristocratic women in films and series such as Aurore et Victorien (1975), Joséphine ou la Comédie des ambitions (1979), and Le Tourbillon des jours (1979).

== Personal life ==
She was the mother of Ariane Grimm (1967–1985), a young diarist whose early writings and personal journals were brought to the attention of the academic community through the studies and publications of Philippe Lejeune, a renowned scholar in the field of autobiography. Ariane died at the age of 18 in a motorbike accident. In 2005, Gisèle Grimm launched a website, dedicated to preserving and promoting the work of her daughter.

== Filmography ==
- Julie Lescaut (1998) - Therese Forgars
- Aldo Tous Risques (1991)
- Le Mari de l'ambassadeur (1991) - Gisele
- Marie Pervenche (1987) - Madame Cochet
- Marriage of the century (1985) - Mortimer
- Allo Beatrice (1984) - Arlette
- Medecins de nuit (1983) - Madame Lombard
- Miss (1979) - Madame Martin
- Victims of Vice (1978) - Madame Pandolini
- Gloria (1977)
- La Bonzesse (1974)
- La Demoiselle d'Avignon (1972)
- Jerk à Istanbul (1967)
- La Bourse et la vie (1966)
- Traffics dans l'ombre (1964) - Madame Giunelli
- OSS 117 (1963) - Giselle
- Ballade pour un voyou (1963)
- L'assassin est dans l'annuaire (1962) - Annette
- Leon Morin, Priest (1961) - Lucienne
- Le travail c'est la liberte (1959)
- Les yeux de l'amour (1959)
- 125 rue Montmarte (1959)
- Archimède, le clochard (1959)
- A Woman like Satan (1958)
- Un drôle de dimanche (1958)
- Cigarettes, whisky et p'tites pépées (1958) - Elisabeth
- Prisons de femmes (1958)
- Je reviendrai à Kandara (1956) - Henriette
