= Gustave Schlumberger =

French historian and numismatist (1844–1929)

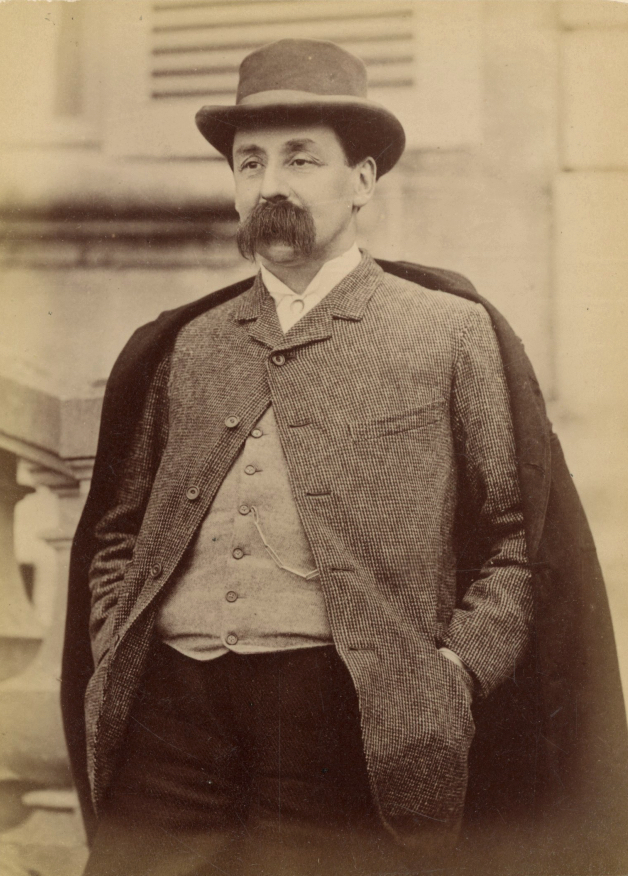
Gustave Schlumberger

Gustave Léon Schlumberger (17 October 1844 – 9 May 1929) was a French historian and numismatist who specialised in the era of the crusades and the Byzantine Empire. His Numismatique de l'Orient Latin (1878–82) is still considered the principal work on the coinage of the crusades. He was awarded the medal of the Royal Numismatic Society in 1903. A large portion of his extensive Crusader coin collection is housed in the Cabinet des Médailles a department of the Bibliothèque nationale de France in Paris.

== Biography ==
He was born in Guebwiller, Alsace, then part of France but later annexed to Germany. From 1863 he studied medicine in Paris. During the Franco-Prussian War, he served on the French side as a medic. In 1871 he returned to Paris, and was awarded a doctorate in 1872 for a thesis on the respiratory tract. After this he travelled extensively in North Africa, Syria, Asia Minor, Spain, Portugal, Switzerland and Italy (visiting also Germany) and then turned to research into the history of the Crusader states and the Byzantine Empire. He was elected president of the Societé des Antiquaires de France. In 1884 he was elected a member of the Académie des Inscriptions et Belles-Lettres. In 1903 he was awarded the Medal of the Royal Numismatic Society.

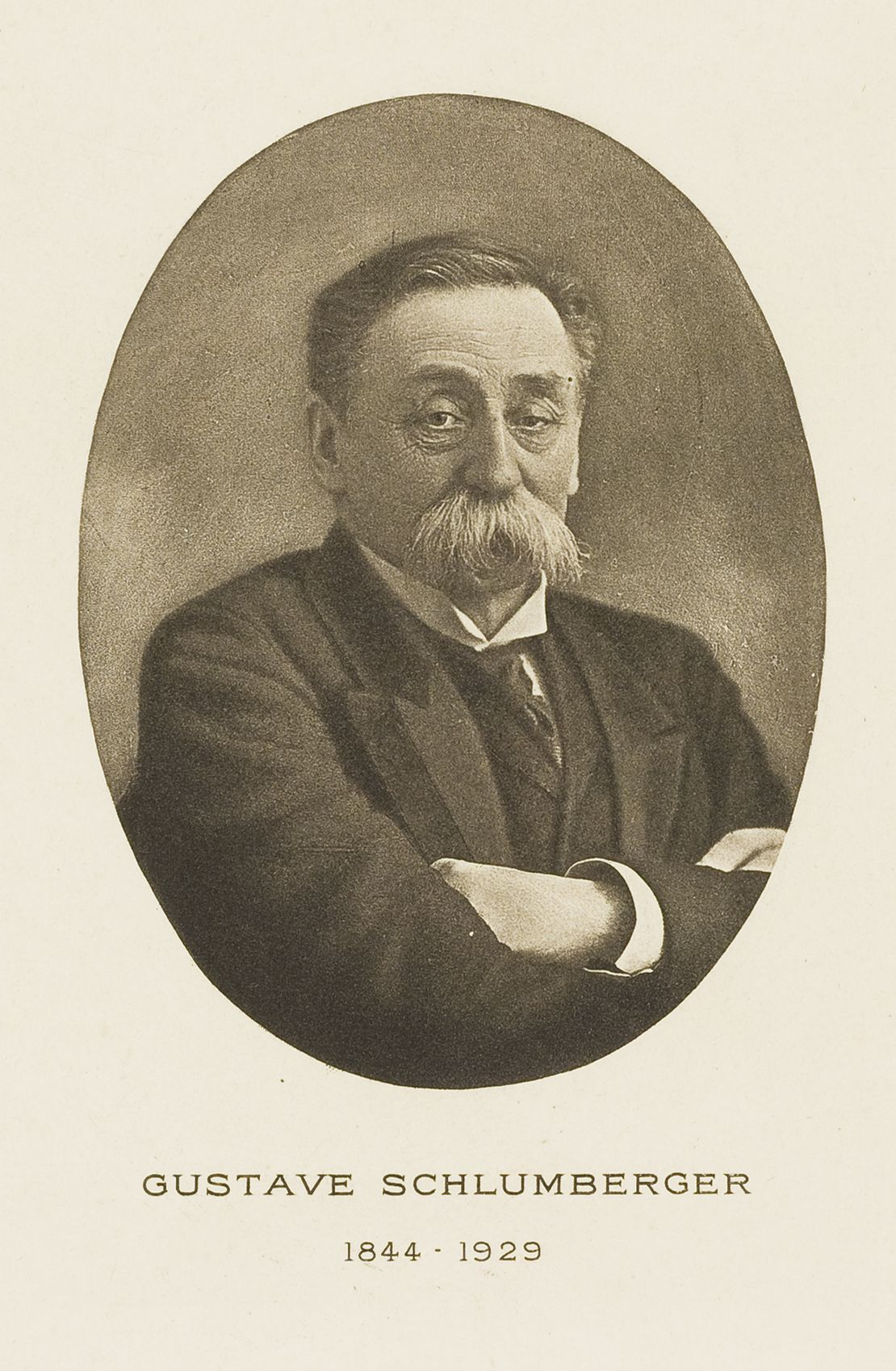
Schlumberger

He was a friend of Edith Wharton, who described him as looking like 'a descendent of one of the Gauls on the arch of Titus'. He also corresponded extensively with the Greek writer Penelope Delta, which correspondence influenced several of her historical novels set in Byzantine times.

He was an ultra-conservative, an active supporter of the anti-Dreyfusard movement. With Edgar Degas, Jean-Louis Forain and Jules Lemaître, he stormed out of the salon of the hostess Genevieve Straus when her friend Joseph Reinach pointed out Dreyfus' innocence. In his memoirs, he wrote of his old friend Charles Haas (a model for Marcel Proust's character Swann): "The delightful Charles Haas, the most likeable and glittering socialite, the best of friends, had nothing Jewish about him except his origins and was not afflicted, as far as I know, with any of the faults of his race, which makes him an exception virtually unique." Following his failure to be elected a member of the Académie française in 1908, Proust, who disliked him, described him as a 'disabused pachyderm'. In his memoirs, Schlumberger, who received a passing mention in Proust's À la recherche du temps perdu, described the novelist as 'bizarre' and described his books as 'admired by some, and quite incomprehensible to others, including myself'.

The Académie des Inscriptions et Belles-Lettres has created an award in his name, the Gustave Schlumberger Prize. Winners have included Joshua Prawer and Denys Pringle.

== Bibliography ==
- 1878-1882 Numismatique de l'Orient Latin (Paris)
- 1884 Les iles des Princes (Calmann Lévy, Paris) - a history of the Princes' Islands under the Byzantines.
- 1890 Un empereur byzantin au dixieme siecle: Nicephore Phocas (Paris) - a biography of the emperor Nikephoros II.
- 1896-1905 L’Epopée byzantine à la fin du dixième siècle (Hachette, Paris, 3 volumes) - a study of Byzantine epic poetry.
- 1898 Renaud de Châtillon, prince d’Antioche, seigneur de la terre d’Outre-Jourdain (Plon, Paris) - a biography of the crusader Raynald of Châtillon.
- 1906 Campagnes du roi Amaury Ier de Jérusalem en Egypte, au XIIe siècle
- 1914 Prise de Saint-Jean-d'Acre, en l'an 1291
- 1926 Le siege la prise et le sac de Constantinople par les Turcs en 1453, 8e Ed., Paris: Librairie Plon.
- 1922/23 Récits De Byzance Et Des Croisades (Plon, Paris)
- 1927 Byzance et les croisades (Lib. Paul Geuthner, Paris)
- 1934 Mes Souvenirs 1844-1928 (Plon, Paris) - posthumously published recollections of life in the Third Republic
- 1962 Lettres De Deux Amis (Institut Français, Athens) - correspondence between Schlumberger and the novelist Penelope Delta.
