= Jean Hougron =

French novelist

Jean Hougron (1 July 1923 – 22 May 2001) was a French novelist, famous for a series of novels set in French Indochina in the mid-20th century, which is where he resided and travelled for several years. Several of these novels are collected in the series La Nuit Indochinoise (The Indochina Night), which include several best sellers, such as Tu récolteras la tempête (Reap the Wirlwind).

== Life ==
Jean Hougron was born on 1 July 1923 to a French Breton family in Colombelles, Calvados, a department of north-western France between Normandy and Brittany. He began his professional life as a teacher of English and sciences in north-western towns, then moved south to Marseille to work for one year with an import-export trading firm. In his youth, Jean Hougron absolutely wanted to leave France. This firm sent him to Indochina in June 1947. From there, he exercised several trades, travelling across Vietnam, Laos, Cambodia, Thailand, and southern China, while learning to speak some of the regional languages. In 1949, he returned to Saigon, Vietnam, where he worked at the US consulate and then at Radio France Asie, the Asian branch of the French state-owned radio broadcasting corporation. He returned to France in 1951. He died on 22 May 2001 in Paris.

== Novels ==
From his years in Indochina, he came with many anecdotes, observations and souvenirs, which he used to write novels, starting with Tu récolteras la tempête (1950). He published several novels, mostly based in Indochina, which met with great success, especially the series of novels the La Nuit Indochinoise collection. In 1953, he was awarded the Grand Prix du roman de l'Académie française (French Academy Novel Prize) for these books.

Hougron's novels are not focused on political subjects, such as on the French Indochina colony and the decolonization movement in South Asia during or after World War II and the beginning of the First Indochina War, but rather on studies of atmosphere, climate, landscape, characters, and human relations. He has been sometimes called "The French Joseph Conrad". Several of his books have been translated and published in English and other languages.

He continued writing novels, which were often best sellers and some of which were made into movies (I'll Get Back to Kandara (1956), directed by Victor Vicas, and Fugitive in Saigon (1957), directed by Marcel Camus).

While the context of his books is dated, some of them, especially the Nuit Indochinoise series, have been re-edited regularly, and he has retained a steady readership.

== Publications ==
- Tu récolteras la tempête (La Nuit indochinoise, I), Domat, 1950
- Rage blanche (La Nuit indochinoise, II), Domat, 1951
- Soleil au ventre (La Nuit indochinoise, III), Domat, 1952
- Mort en fraude (La Nuit indochinoise, IV), Domat, 1953 (Grand Prix du roman de l'Académie française 1953)
- Les Portes de l'aventure (La Nuit indochinoise, V), Domat, 1954
- Les Asiates (La Nuit indochinoise, VI), Domat, 1954
- Je reviendrai à Kandara, Domat, 1955
- Quatrième étage, in Les Oeuvres libres..., A. Fayard, 1955
- La Terre du barbare (La Nuit indochinoise, VII), Del Duca, 1958
- Par qui le scandale, Éditions mondiales, 1960
- Le Signe du chien, Denoël, coll. "Présence du futur", n°44, 1961
- Histoire de Georges Guersant, Stock, 1964 (Prix du roman populiste 1965)
- Les Humiliés, Stock, 1965
- La Gueule pleine de dents, Plon, 1970
- L'Homme de proie, Plon, 1974
- L'Anti-jeu, Plon, 1977
- Le Naguen, Plon, 1980 (Grand Prix de la Science-Fiction 1981)
- La Chambre, Hachette, 1982
- Coup de soleil, Hachette, 1984
- Beauté chinoise, Hachette, 1987
