= Emmanouil Benakis =

Greek merchant and politician

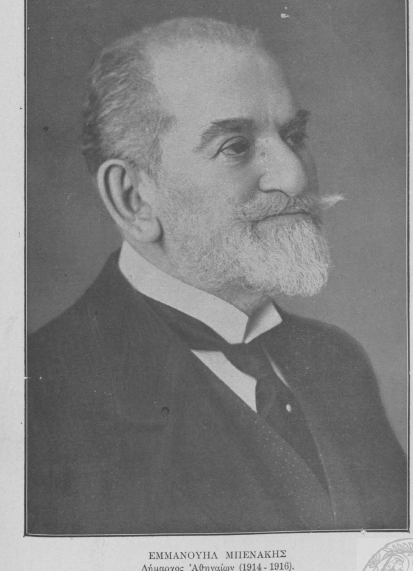

Emmanouil Benakis (Greek: Εμμανουήλ Μπενάκης; 1843 in Ermoupoli, Syros – June 20, 1929 in Kifisia) was a Greek merchant and politician, considered a national benefactor of Greece.

== Biography ==
After studying in England, Benakis emigrated to Alexandria, Egypt, where he worked for the Greek cotton industrialist Horemi, and into whose family he married. He had six children, among whom were the writer Penelope Delta, the art collector Antonis Benakis and Argini Salvago whose daughter married into the Melas family and whose son was the couturier Jean Dessès. Benakis became the president of the Greek community in Alexandria and ran the largest enterprise of Greek cotton brokers in Egypt. He accumulated a considerable fortune.

As a close friend of Eleftherios Venizelos, he was elected to the Hellenic Parliament and served as Minister of Agriculture and Industry. He was elected mayor of the city of Athens in 1914.

Among other benefactions he contributed to the settlement of refugees in the aftermath of the Greco-Turkish war in Asia Minor. He donated to the Red Cross Nurses' School and the Athens College. He provided for his fortune to be posthumously placed at the disposal of several charitable foundations, and his funeral was carried out at Greek public expense.

The Benaki Phytopathological Institute was one such institution founded through his legacy.
