= Martin Roumagnac =

- Original French film poster
- Directed by: Georges Lacombe
- Written by: Georges Lacombe; Pierre Véry
- Based on: Martin Roumagnac; 1935 novel by Pierre-René Wolf
- Produced by: Marc Le Pelletier; Paul-Edmond Decharme
- Starring: Jean Gabin; Marlene Dietrich; Marcel Herrand; Daniel Gélin
- Cinematography: Roger Hubert
- Edited by: Germaine Artus
- Music by: Marcel Mirouze; Giovanni Fusco
- Distributed by: Gaumont Distribution
- Release dates: 18 December 1946 (France); 3 September 1948 (U.S.)
- Running time: 116 minutes
- Country: France
- Language: French
- Box office: 2,491,000 admissions (France)

Martin Roumagnac (also known as The Room Upstairs) is a 1946 French crime film directed by Georges Lacombe. It tells the story of a builder in a small town who falls for a glamorous but treacherous femme fatale, with tragic results for both. It is notable as the only occasion in which the two major stars Jean Gabin and Marlene Dietrich, lovers in real life, appeared together on screen.

== Plot ==
In a little country town, Martin Roumagnac is a building contractor who is liked by the ordinary people. He lives in a shack with his sister while he builds a villa on a plot he has bought. Into town with her uncle comes Blanche Ferrand, an exotic widow who married the owner of the seed and grain shop shortly before his death. Her target for next husband is Laubry, a retired diplomat with a dying wife, and while waiting she has an occasional lover. She also has to fend off a besotted schoolteacher.

One evening, feeling the need for some excitement, she goes to a boxing match and sits next to the ebullient Martin. Soon the two are lovers, and when Martin finishes his villa he gives it to her (thereby losing its capital value and depressing his creditworthiness).

Though passionate in private, she finds his lack of refinement embarrassing in public: he drinks only Pernod and chain-smokes Gauloises. He cannot fully understand her more sophisticated take on life, and her love of Paris, where she feels alive, and he feels out of place. But the love between them is very real, and deeper than anything either of them has experienced before.

His business suffers from his obsession and he is running out of cash. He is increasingly disturbed by the gossip in the town about him and Blanche. He expected her upper class friends to say he wasn't good enough for her, but he hears the same snickering asides from his own friends and family.

When Laubry's wife dies, Blanche looks forward to a profitable alliance with him, where she will be free to have lovers if she pleases; but Laubry insists she must first break with Martin—not because he cares if she is faithful, but because the lower social standing of the 'bricklayer' would damage her in the eyes of the social circles they would be moving in. His contemptuous words about Martin enrage her, and she accuses him of giving her his wife's corpse as a wedding gift. This makes the match impossible, and he leaves.

She also rejects the offer of a local suitor, the deputy mayor of the town, who says he'll improve Martin's business prospects, and then he and Martin can share her. Enraged at the men in her life and at herself, she sells the shop, and resolves to leave the town forever. She releases the birds, wanting them to be free, even though they are not native, and will die in the winter.

Martin, knowing nothing of her having dismissed her other suitors in favor of him, and believing she is going to marry the consul, goes to the villa to confront her, and she is too proud to tell him the truth. In his rage, he strangles her, and the villa catches on fire, destroying all the evidence. He goes home in shock and reveals what he did. His sister promises him an alibi and enlists the postman as a witness, turning the clock back, so that it will seem to the usually drunken postman that Martin was having lunch when the crime took place.

His trial is going badly for him until under questioning Blanche's uncle (who was not really her uncle at all, but a former lover and mentor who she formed a lasting friendship with) reveals that from her teens she had many men (Martin, forgetting his peril, protests this line of attack from his attorney, saying he doesn't want her reputation smeared). But even while exonerating Martin, lying about how he saw no anger in him shortly before the murder, the old man aims a telling emotional blow when he reveals that she had rejected the consul and his wealth, because of the man's petty snobbery towards the 'bricklayer.' Martin now feels the full impact of what he has done, the injustice he has committed towards the only woman he ever loved.

The jury acquits him unanimously and he goes home to a party organized by his sister, whose perjury was believed. In the shadows is the rebuffed teacher, who has been watching the entire trial, watching Martin closely, seeing his reaction to the revelation that she had, in fact, been true to him in her heart. Martin sees the young man in the barn, watching him, holding a gun. He deliberately turns his back, silhouetted in the open window, waiting for the shots he knows are coming, while he smokes his last Gauloise.

== Cast ==
- Jean Gabin as Martin Roumagnac
- Marlène Dietrich as Blanche Ferrand
- Margo Lion as Martin's sister
- Jean d'Yd as Blanche's uncle
- Daniel Gélin as teacher transfixed by Blanche
- Marcel Herrand as Laubry, the diplomat
- Lucien Nat as Blanche's lover before Martin

== Production ==
Filming took place at the Studios de Saint-Maurice in Val-de-Marne. Exterior scenes were filmed at the Château de Vaudrémont near Saint-Dizier (Haute-Marne).
