= Penelope Delta =

Greek children's writer (1874–1941)

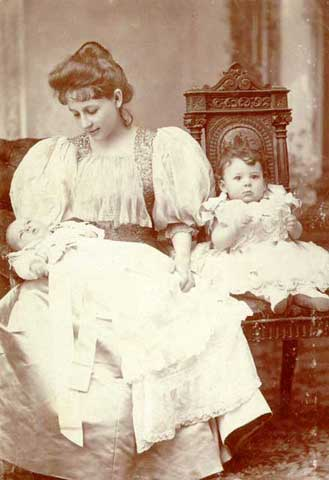
- Penelope Delta, age 33, holding her baby daughter
- Native name: Πηνελόπη Δέλτα
- Born: Penelope Benaki (Πηνελόπη Μπενάκη); 24 April 1874 Alexandria, Khedivate of Egypt
- Died: 2 May 1941 (aged 67) Athens, Greece
- Occupation: Novelist; poet; children's writer
- Spouse: Stephanos Deltas
- Children: 3
- Parents: Emmanouil Benakis (father); Virginia Choremi (mother)

Penelope Delta (Greek: Πηνελόπη Δέλτα; 24 April 1874 – 2 May 1941) was a Greek author. She is widely celebrated for her contributions to the field of children's literature. Her historical novels have been widely read and have influenced popular modern Greek perceptions of national identity and history. Through her long-time association with Ion Dragoumis, Delta was thrust into the middle of turbulent early-20th-century Greek politics, ranging from the Macedonian Struggle to the National Schism.

== Early life ==
Delta was born Penelope Benaki (Greek: Πηνελόπη Μπενάκη) in Alexandria, in the Khedivate of Egypt, to Virginia (née Choremi) and the wealthy cotton merchant Emmanouil Benakis. She was the third of six children, her two older siblings being Alexandra and Antonis Benakis, whose Tom Sawyer-like mischiefs she immortalized in her book Trellantonis; her younger siblings were Constantine, who died at the age of two, Alexander, and Argine.

== Marriage ==
The Benaki family temporarily moved to Athens in 1882. Penelope married a wealthy Phanariote entrepreneur, Stephanos Deltas, with whom she had three daughters, Sophia Mavrogordatou, Virginia Zanna, and Alexandra Papadopoulou. Stephanos Deltas was related to mathematician Constantin Carathéodory through his wife Sophia whose father was Alexander Karathéodori Pasha. They returned to Alexandria in 1905, where she met Ion Dragoumis, then the Vice-Consul of Greece in Alexandria. Dragoumis, like Penelope Delta, also wrote on the subject of the Macedonian Struggle. Personal recollections of his appear throughout his writings. A romantic relationship is said to have developed between the pair. Delta and Dragoumis decided to separate, but continued to correspond passionately until 1912, when Dragoumis started a relationship with the famous stage actress Marika Kotopouli. Penelope had, in the meantime, twice attempted suicide.

== Writing career ==
Delta moved to Frankfurt, Germany in 1906. Her husband had chosen to relocate in order to manage the offices of the Khoremis-Benakis cotton business. Her first novel, Gia tēn Patrida (For the Sake of the Fatherland) was published in 1909. The novel is set during the Byzantine epoch. It was during this time that Delta had started to correspond with the historian Gustave Schlumberger, a renowned specialist on the Byzantine Empire. Their continued interaction provided the material for her second novel, Ton Kairo tou Voulgaroktonou (In the Years of the Bulgar-Slayer), set during the reign of the Emperor Basil II. The Goudi Pronunciamento in 1909 inspired her third novel, Paramythi Hōris Onoma (A Tale with No Name), published in 1911.

In 1913 the Deltas returned to Alexandria yet again, and in 1916, settled permanently in Athens. At this time, her father, Emmanuel Benakis, had been elected Mayor. They soon became close friends with Eleftherios Venizelos, whom they entertained regularly at their opulent mansion in the northern suburb of Kifisia. Penelope's father had been a political associate of Venizelos since his move to Athens in 1910, and had served as Finance Minister in the first Venizelos administration.

Her long correspondence with Bishop Chrysanthos, Metropolitan of Trebizond, provided the material for her 1925 book, The Life of Christ. In 1925, she was diagnosed with polio. In 1927, she started writing the trilogy Rōmiopoules (Young Greek Girls), a thinly veiled autobiography, which she did not finish until 1939. Set in Athens, the first part, To Xypnēma (The Awakening) covers the events from 1895 to 1907, the second part Hē Lavra (The Heat) covers 1907 to 1909, and the final part, To Souroupo (The Dusk), covers 1914 to 1920. Her personal acquaintance with the political events of this tumultuous era provided her with the materials for a convincing and detailed account. Her father was almost executed for treason by the Royalist Party. Ion Dragoumis was assassinated by Venizelos sympathizers in 1920. Following the death of Dragoumis, Delta would appear in nothing but black.

In the meantime she published her three major novels: Trellantōnēs (Crazy Anthony; 1932), which detailed her mischievous elder brother's Antonis Benakis childhood adventures in late 19th century Alexandria, Mangas (1935), which was about the not dissimilar adventures of the family's Fox Terrier dog, and Ta Mystika tou Valtou (The Secrets of the Swamp; 1937), which was set around Giannitsa Lake in the early 20th century, while the Greek struggle for Macedonia was unfolding.

While Penelope Delta received credit for transcribing the memories of that particular war, the actual narratives were collected in 1932–1935 by her secretary Antigone Bellou Threpsiadi - herself a daughter of a Macedonian fighter.

During the daytime, Delta famously forbade her grandchildren from visiting her while writing. She would, however, spend the entire evening with family. It is said that in lieu of bedtime stories, Delta would read to them whatever she had managed to produce during the day.

== Later life ==
During the final year of her life, in the midst of advancing paralysis, she received the diaries and archives of her lost love, Ion Dragoumis. These particular documents had been entrusted to her by Ion's brother, Philip. She managed to dictate approximately 1000 pages of commentary on Dragoumis' work, before deciding to take her own life. She committed suicide by taking poison on 27 April 1941, on the very day which Wehrmacht troops entered into Athens. She died on 2 May 1941. At her request she was interred in the garden of the stately Delta mansion in Kifissia. Chrysanthos, the then Archbishop of Athens, officiated at the funeral. On her grave, in the garden of her house, the word σιωπή, siōpē ("silence") was engraved.

== Descendants ==
The Delta mansion was inherited by her three daughters, Sophia, Virginia, and Alexandra, who added a guesthouse they named "Sovirale", after the initial letters of their first names. Virginia married politician Alexander Zannas, and their daughter Lena was the mother of contemporary politician Antonis Samaras; their son, Pavlos (Paul) Zannas (1929–1989) was a prominent art critic as well as Modern Greek translator of Marcel Proust's "À la recherche du temps perdu". In 1989, Alexandra, then the last living Delta daughter, bequeathed the mansion to the Benaki Museum.

== Works in English translation ==
- Secrets of the Swamp, translated by Ruth Bobick, Peter E. Randall Publisher, Portsmouth, NH 2012, ISBN 978-1931807876
- In the Heroic Age of Basil II: Emperor of Byzantium, translated by Ruth Bobick, Peter E. Randall Publisher, Portsmouth NH 2006, ISBN 978-1931807524
- A tale without a name, translated and illustrated by Mika Provata-Carlone Publisher Pushkin Press, London 2013 ISBN 978-1782270287
