= Hans Zimmer discography =

German film composer and music producer Hans Zimmer has composed and produced over one hundred soundtracks and film scores. Of them, about 50 soundtracks and songs have been nominated for awards. He has won two Academy Awards (The Lion King, Dune), a BAFTA Award (Dune), four Satellite Awards (The Thin Red Line, Gladiator, The Last Samurai, Inception), three Golden Globe Awards (The Lion King, Gladiator, Dune), five Grammy Awards (two prizes for The Lion King, Crimson Tide, The Dark Knight and Dune: Part Two), three Saturn Awards (The Dark Knight, Inception, Interstellar), two Annie Awards (Kung Fu Panda, Secrets of the Furious Five), and two WAFCA Awards (Inception, Dune).

== As composer ==
=== Feature films ===
==== 1980s ====
Year	Album	Director	Studio / Distributor	Notes
1982	Moonlighting	Jerzy Skolimowski	Miracle Films	Composed with Stanley Myers
1984	Success Is the Best Revenge	Jerzy Skolimowski	Gaumont	Composed with Stanley Myers
1984	Story of O – Chapter 2	Éric Rochat	Cannon Film Distributors	Composed with Stanley Myers
1985	My Beautiful Laundrette	Stephen Frears	Working Title Films; Channel Four Films	Composed with Stanley Myers
1985	Insignificance	Nicolas Roeg	Recorded Picture Company; Zenith Productions	Composed with Stanley Myers
1986	The Zero Boys	Nico Mastorakis	Omega Entertainment	Composed with Stanley Myers
1986	Separate Vacations	Michael Anderson	Alliance Communications; Playboy Productions	Composed with Stanley Myers
1987	Terminal Exposure	Nico Mastorakis	Omega Entertainment	Composed with Stanley Myers
1987	Nightmare at Noon	Nico Mastorakis	Omega Entertainment	Composed with Stanley Myers
1987	The Wind	Nico Mastorakis	Omega Entertainment	Composed with Stanley Myers
1988	The Nature of the Beast	Franco Rosso	Channel Four Films; Cannon Film Distributors	Composed with Stanley Myers
1988	The Fruit Machine	Philip Saville	Film4 Productions; Cannon Films	Composed with Stanley Myers
1988	A World Apart	Chris Menges	Atlantic Releasing Corporation	—N/a
1988	Taffin	Francis Megahy	Vestron Pictures; Metro-Goldwyn-Mayer; United Artists	Composed with Stanley Myers
1988	Paperhouse	Bernard Rose	Working Title Films; Vestron Pictures	Composed with Stanley Myers
1988	Rain Man	Barry Levinson	Barris Industries; Guber-Peters Company; United Artists; Metro-Goldwyn-Mayer	Nominated–Academy Award for Best Original Score; 1st of the 4 collaborations with Barry Levinson
1988	Burning Secret	Andrew Birkin	Vestron Pictures	—N/a
1989	Twister	Michael Almereyda	Vestron Pictures	—N/a
1989	Black Rain	Ridley Scott	Paramount Pictures	1st of the 6 collaborations with Ridley Scott
1989	Diamond Skulls	Nick Broomfield	Film4 Productions; Working Title Films	—N/a
1989	Driving Miss Daisy	Bruce Beresford	The Zanuck Company; Warner Bros. Pictures	

==== 1990s ====
Year	Title	Director(s)	Studio / Publisher	Notes
1990	Chicago Joe and the Showgirl	Bernard Rose	LIVE Entertainment; PolyGram Filmed Entertainment; Working Title Films; New Line Cinema	—N/a
1990	Bird on a Wire	John Badham	Interscope Communications; Universal Pictures	—N/a
1990	Fools of Fortune	Pat O'Connor	Channel Four Films	—N/a
1990	Days of Thunder	Tony Scott	Don Simpson/Jerry Bruckheimer Films; Paramount Pictures	1st of the 4 collaborations with Tony Scott
1990	Pacific Heights	John Schlesinger	Morgan Creek Productions; 20th Century Fox (Theatrical); Sony Pictures (Home media)	—N/a
1990	Green Card	Peter Weir	Umbrella Entertainment; Touchstone Pictures	—N/a
1991	Backdraft	Ron Howard	Imagine Entertainment; Universal Pictures	1st of the 9 collaborations with Ron Howard
1991	Thelma & Louise	Ridley Scott	Pathé; Metro-Goldwyn-Mayer	Nominated–BAFTA Award for Best Film Music
1991	Regarding Henry	Mike Nichols	Paramount Pictures	—N/a
1991	Where Sleeping Dogs Lie	Charles Finch	August Entertainment; Columbia TriStar	Composed with Mark Mancina
1991	K2	Franc Roddam	Paramount Pictures	Composed with Chaz Jankel
1992	Radio Flyer	Richard Donner	Columbia Pictures	—N/a
1992	The Power of One	John G. Avildsen	Regency Enterprises; Le Studio Canal+ Village Roadshow Pictures; Warner Bros. Pictures	—N/a
1992	A League of Their Own	Penny Marshall	Columbia Pictures	—N/a
1992	Toys	Barry Levinson	Baltimore Pictures; 20th Century Fox	Composed with Trevor Horn; Nominated–Saturn Award for Best Music
1993	Point of No Return	John Badham	Warner Bros. Pictures	—N/a
1993	Younger and Younger	Percy Adlon	Transmundo Films	—N/a
1993	Calendar Girl	John Whitesell	Columbia Pictures	—N/a
1993	True Romance	Tony Scott	Morgan Creek Productions; Davis Films; Warner Bros. Pictures	—N/a
1993	Cool Runnings	Jon Turteltaub	Walt Disney Pictures	—N/a
1993	The House of the Spirits	Bille August	Constantin Film; Miramax Films	—N/a
1994	I'll Do Anything	James L. Brooks	Gracie Films; Columbia Pictures	—N/a
1994	Renaissance Man	Penny Marshall	Cinergi Pictures; Touchstone Pictures	—N/a
1994	The Lion King	Roger Allers; Rob Minkoff	Walt Disney Feature Animation; Walt Disney Pictures	Original songs by Elton John and Tim Rice; Academy Award for Best Original Score; Golden Globe Award for Best Original Score; Grammy Award for Best Arrangement, Instrumental and Vocals; Grammy Award for Best Musical Album for Children; Nominated–BAFTA Award for Best Film Music; Nominated–Grammy Award for Best Score Soundtrack for Visual Media; First score for an animated film
1994	Drop Zone	John Badham	Paramount Pictures	—N/a
1995	Crimson Tide	Tony Scott	Don Simpson/Jerry Bruckheimer Films; Hollywood Pictures	Nominated–Grammy Award for Best Score Soundtrack for Visual Media; Nominated–Saturn Award for Best Music
1995	Beyond Rangoon	John Boorman	Castle Rock Entertainment; Columbia Pictures	—N/a
1995	Nine Months	Chris Columbus	1492 Pictures; 20th Century Fox	—N/a
1995	Something to Talk About	Lasse Hallström	Warner Bros. Pictures	Composed with Graham Preskett
1995	Two Deaths	Nicolas Roeg	Castle Hill	—N/a
1996	The Whole Wide World	Dan Ireland	Sony Pictures Classics; The Kushner-Locke Company; Cineville	with Harry Gregson-Williams
1996	Broken Arrow	John Woo	20th Century Fox	—N/a
1996	Muppet Treasure Island	Brian Henson	Jim Henson Productions; Walt Disney Pictures	Original songs by Barry Mann and Cynthia Weil
1996	The Rock	Michael Bay	Don Simpson/Jerry Bruckheimer Films; Hollywood Pictures	Composed with Nick Glennie-Smith; Nominated–Saturn Award for Best Music
1996	The Fan	Tony Scott	Mandalay Entertainment; Scott Free Productions; TriStar Pictures	—N/a
1996	The Preacher's Wife	Penny Marshall	The Samuel Goldwyn Company; Touchstone Pictures	Nominated–Academy Award for Best Original Score
1997	Smilla's Sense of Snow	Bille August	Bavaria Film; Constantin Film; Det Danske Filminstitut; Greenland Film Production; Nordisk Film	Composed with Harry Gregson-Williams
1997	The Peacemaker	Mimi Leder	DreamWorks Pictures	—N/a
1997	As Good as It Gets	James L. Brooks	Gracie Films; TriStar Pictures	Nominated–Academy Award for Best Original Score
1998	The Last Days	James Moll	October Films	Documentary film
1998	The Prince of Egypt	Simon Wells; Brenda Chapman; Steve Hickner	DreamWorks Animation; DreamWorks Pictures	Original songs by Stephen Schwartz; Nominated–Academy Award for Best Original Score; Nominated–Golden Globe Award for Best Original Score; Nominated–Saturn Award for Best Music
1998	The Thin Red Line	Terrence Malick	Phoenix Pictures; 20th Century Fox	Nominated–Academy Award for Best Original Score
1999	Chill Factor	Hugh Johnson	Morgan Creek Productions; Warner Bros. Pictures	Composed with John Powell

==== 2000s ====
Year	Title	Director(s)	Studio / Distributor	Notes
2000	An Everlasting Piece	Barry Levinson	DreamWorks Pictures (US); Columbia Pictures (International)	—N/a
2000	Mission: Impossible 2	John Woo	Cruise/Wagner Productions; Paramount Pictures	—N/a
2000	The Road to El Dorado	Eric "Bibo" Bergeron; Don Paul	DreamWorks Animation; DreamWorks Pictures	Composed with John Powell; Original songs by Elton John and Tim Rice; Nominated–Annie Award Outstanding Individual Achievement for Music in an Animated Feature Production; Nominated–Saturn Award for Best Music
2000	Gladiator	Ridley Scott	Scott Free Productions; Red Wagon Entertainment; DreamWorks Pictures (US); Universal Pictures (International)	Composed with Lisa Gerrard; Golden Globe Award for Best Original Score; Nominated–Academy Award for Best Original Score; Nominated–BAFTA Award for Best Film Music; Nominated–Grammy Award for Best Score Soundtrack for Visual Media; Nominated–Saturn Award for Best Music
2001	Black Hawk Down	Ridley Scott	Revolution Studios; Jerry Bruckheimer Films; Scott Free Productions; Columbia Pictures	—N/a
2001	Riding in Cars with Boys	Penny Marshall	Gracie Films; Columbia Pictures	—N/a
2001	Pearl Harbor	Michael Bay	Jerry Bruckheimer Films; Touchstone Pictures	Nominated–Golden Globe Award for Best Original Score
2001	Hannibal	Ridley Scott	Dino De Laurentiis Company; Scott Free Productions; Metro-Goldwyn-Mayer; Universal Pictures	—N/a
2001	Invincible	Werner Herzog	Channel Four Films (UK); Fine Line Features (US)	Composed with Klaus Badelt
2001	The Pledge	Sean Penn	Franchise Pictures; Morgan Creek Productions; Warner Bros.	Composed with Klaus Badelt
2002	Spirit: Stallion of the Cimarron	Kelly Asbury; Lorna Cook	DreamWorks Animation; DreamWorks Pictures	Features lyrics and vocals by Bryan Adams; Nominated–Golden Globe Award for Best Original Score
2002	The Country Bears	Peter Hastings	Walt Disney Pictures	
2002	The Ring	Gore Verbinski	DreamWorks Pictures	Nominated–Fangoria Chainsaw Award for Best Score; 1st of the 6 collaborations with Gore Verbinski
2003	The Last Samurai	Edward Zwick	Radar Pictures; The Bedford Falls Company; Cruise/Wagner Productions; Warner Bros.	Nominated–Golden Globe Award for Best Original Score
2003	Something's Gotta Give	Nancy Meyers	Columbia Pictures (US); Warner Bros. (International)	—N/a
2003	Matchstick Men	Ridley Scott	ImageMovers; Scott Free Productions; Saturn Films; Warner Bros.	—N/a
2003	Tears of the Sun	Antoine Fuqua	Revolution Studios; Cheyenne Enterprises; Columbia Pictures	—N/a
2004	Spanglish	James L. Brooks	Gracie Films; Columbia Pictures	Nominated–Golden Globe Award for Best Original Score
2004	Laura's Star	Piet De Rycker	Warner Bros. Family Entertainment	Composed with Nick Glennie-Smith & Henning Lohner
2004	King Arthur	Antoine Fuqua	Jerry Bruckheimer Films; Touchstone Pictures	—N/a
2004	Thunderbirds	Jonathan Frakes	StudioCanal; Working Title Films; Universal Pictures	
2004	Shark Tale	Vicky Jenson; Bibo Bergeron; Rob Letterman	DreamWorks Animation; DreamWorks Pictures	—N/a
2005	The Weather Man	Gore Verbinski	Escape Artists; Paramount Pictures	Composed with James S. Levine
2005	The Little Polar Bear 2: The Mysterious Island	Piet De Rycker	Rothkirch Cartoon Film; Warner Bros. Family Entertainment	Composed with Nick Glennie-Smith
2005	Madagascar	Eric Darnell; Tom McGrath	DreamWorks Animation; PDI/DreamWorks; DreamWorks Pictures	Nominated–Annie Award for Music in a Feature Production; Replaced Harry Gregson-Williams
2005	Batman Begins	Christopher Nolan	DC Comics; Syncopy Inc. Legendary Pictures; Warner Bros.	First superhero film Composed with James Newton Howard; Nominated–Saturn Award for Best Music; 1st of the 6 collaborations with Christopher Nolan
2006	Pirates of the Caribbean: Dead Man's Chest	Gore Verbinski	Jerry Bruckheimer Films; Walt Disney Pictures	Nominated–Grammy Award for Best Score Soundtrack for Visual Media
2006	The Da Vinci Code	Ron Howard	Imagine Entertainment; Rainmaker Digital Effects; Columbia Pictures	Nominated–Golden Globe Award for Best Original Score; Nominated–Grammy Award for Best Score Soundtrack for Visual Media
2006	The Holiday	Nancy Meyers	Relativity Media; Waverly Films; Columbia Pictures (US); Universal Pictures (International)	—N/a
2007	Pirates of the Caribbean: At World's End	Gore Verbinski	Jerry Bruckheimer Films; Walt Disney Pictures	—N/a
2007	The Simpsons Movie	David Silverman	Gracie Films; Matt Groening Productions; 20th Century Fox Animation; 20th Century Fox	Themes composed by Danny Elfman; Replaced Alf Clausen
2008	Road to Fame	Issa López	Columbia Pictures	—N/a
2008	Kung Fu Panda	John Stevenson; Mark Osborne	DreamWorks Animation; Paramount Pictures	Composed with John Powell; Annie Award for Music in a Feature Production
2008	The Dark Knight	Christopher Nolan	DC Comics; Syncopy Inc. Legendary Pictures; Warner Bros.	Composed with James Newton Howard; Grammy Award for Best Score Soundtrack for Visual Media; Saturn Award for Best Music; Nominated–BAFTA Award for Best Film Music
2008	Madagascar: Escape 2 Africa	Eric Darnell; Tom McGrath	DreamWorks Animation; PDI/DreamWorks; Paramount Pictures	Composed with will.i.am
2008	The Burning Plain	Guillermo Arriaga	Wild Bunch; 2929 Entertainment; Paramount Pictures	Composed with Omar Rodríguez-López
2008	Frost/Nixon	Ron Howard	Imagine Entertainment; Working Title Films; StudioCanal; Universal Pictures	Nominated–Golden Globe Award for Best Original Score
2009	Angels & Demons	Ron Howard	Imagine Entertainment; Columbia Pictures	Features solo violinist Joshua Bell
2009	Sherlock Holmes	Guy Ritchie	Silver Pictures; Village Roadshow Pictures; Warner Bros. Pictures	Nominated–Academy Award for Best Original Score; Nominated–Grammy Award for Best Score Soundtrack for Visual Media; Nominated–Saturn Award for Best Music; 1st collaboration with Guy Ritchie
2009	It's Complicated	Nancy Meyers	Relativity Media; Waverly Films; Dentsu; Universal Pictures	Composed with Heitor Pereira

==== 2010s ====
Year	Title	Director(s)	Studio / Distributor	Notes
2010	Inception	Christopher Nolan	Syncopy; Legendary Pictures; Warner Bros.	Saturn Award for Best Music; Nominated–Academy Award for Best Original Score; Nominated–BAFTA Award for Best Film Music; Nominated–Golden Globe Award for Best Original Score; Nominated–Grammy Award for Best Score Soundtrack for Visual Media
2010	Megamind	Tom McGrath	DreamWorks Animation; PDI/DreamWorks; Paramount Pictures	Composed with Lorne Balfe
2010	How Do You Know	James L. Brooks	Gracie Films; Columbia Pictures	—N/a
2010	Henri 4	Jo Baier	—N/a	Composed with Henry Jackman
2011	Rango	Gore Verbinski	Nickelodeon Movies; GK Films; Industrial Light & Magic; Paramount Pictures	—N/a
2011	Pirates of the Caribbean: On Stranger Tides	Rob Marshall	Jerry Bruckheimer Films; Walt Disney Pictures	Featuring Rodrigo y Gabriela
2011	Kung Fu Panda 2	Jennifer Yuh Nelson	DreamWorks Animation; Paramount Pictures	Composed with John Powell
2011	The Dilemma	Ron Howard	Imagine Entertainment; Spyglass Entertainment; Universal Pictures	Composed with Lorne Balfe
2011	Jealous of the Birds	Jordan Bahat	Orlean Films	Documentary film
2011	Sherlock Holmes: A Game of Shadows	Guy Ritchie	Silver Pictures; Village Roadshow Pictures; Warner Bros. Pictures	2nd collaboration with Ritchie
2012	Madagascar 3: Europe's Most Wanted	Eric Darnell; Tom McGrath; Conrad Vernon	DreamWorks Animation; PDI/DreamWorks; Paramount Pictures	—N/a
2012	The Dark Knight Rises	Christopher Nolan	DC Comics; Syncopy; Legendary Pictures; Warner Bros.	Brit Award for Composer of the Year; Brit Award for Outstanding Contribution to Music; Nominated–Grammy Award for Best Score Soundtrack for Visual Media; Nominated–Saturn Award for Best Music
2013	Rush	Ron Howard	Cross Creek Pictures; Exclusive Films; Working Title Films; Imagine Entertainment; Revolution Films; Universal Pictures (US); StudioCanal (UK); Universum Film (Germany)	—N/a
2013	Man of Steel	Zack Snyder	DC Comics; Syncopy; Legendary Pictures; Warner Bros.	—N/a
2013	The Lone Ranger	Gore Verbinski	Jerry Bruckheimer Films; Walt Disney Pictures	Replaced Jack White
2013	Mr. Morgan's Last Love	Sandra Nettelbeck	Sidney Kimmel Entertainment; RLJE Films	—N/a
2013	12 Years a Slave	Steve McQueen	Regency Enterprises; River Road Entertainment; Plan B Entertainment; Film4; Fox Searchlight Pictures (US); Entertainment One (Canada); Summit Entertainment (UK)	Nominated–BAFTA Award for Best Film Music; Nominated–Golden Globe Award for Best Original Score
2013	Brave Miss World	Cecilia Peck	Netflix; Rocket Girl Productions; Artemis Rising Foundation; Foundation for Jewish Culture; Kroll Documentary Fund; The Fledgling Fund; Reif Entertainment; Channel 2	—N/a
2014	Son of God	Christopher Spencer	Lightworkers Media; 20th Century Fox	Composed with Lorne Balfe and Lisa Gerrard; Feature film version of television series The Bible
2014	The Amazing Spider-Man 2	Marc Webb	Marvel Entertainment; Matt Tolmach Productions; Arad Productions, Inc. Columbia Pictures	Composed with The Magnificent Six (consisting of Pharrell Williams, Michael Einziger, Junkie XL, Johnny Marr, Andrew Kawczynski and Steve Mazzaro)
2014	Winter's Tale	Akiva Goldsman	Village Roadshow Pictures; Weed Road Pictures; Warner Bros.	Composed with Rupert Gregson-Williams
2014	Interstellar	Christopher Nolan	Legendary Pictures; Syncopy; Lynda Obst Productions; Paramount Pictures (US); Warner Bros. (International)	Saturn Award for Best Music; Nominated–Academy Award for Best Original Score; Nominated–BAFTA Award for Best Film Music; Nominated–Golden Globe Award for Best Original Score; Nominated–Grammy Award for Best Score Soundtrack for Visual Media
2015	Chappie	Neill Blomkamp	Media Rights Capital; Columbia Pictures	—N/a
2015	The Little Prince	Mark Osborne	Orange Studio; Paramount Pictures	Composed with Richard Harvey and Camille; Nominated–Annie Award for Music in a Feature Production
2015	Freeheld	Peter Sollett	Endgame Entertainment; Lionsgate	Composed with Johnny Marr
2015	Woman in Gold	Simon Curtis	BBC Films; Origin Pictures	Composed with Martin Phipps
2016	Kung Fu Panda 3	Jennifer Yuh Nelson; Alessandro Carloni	DreamWorks Animation; China Film Group Corporation; Oriental DreamWorks; Zhong Ming You Ying Film; 20th Century Fox	—N/a
2016	Batman v Superman: Dawn of Justice	Zack Snyder	DC Comics; Atlas Entertainment; RatPac Entertainment; Cruel and Unusual Films; Warner Bros.	Composed with Junkie XL
2016	The Last Face	Sean Penn	FilmHaven Productions; Saban Films	—N/a
2016	Inferno	Ron Howard	Imagine Entertainment; Columbia Pictures	—N/a
2016	Hidden Figures	Theodore Melfi	20th Century Fox; Chernin Entertainment	Composed with Pharrell Williams and Benjamin Wallfisch; Nominated–Golden Globe Award for Best Original Score; Nominated–Grammy Award for Best Score Soundtrack for Visual Media
2017	The Boss Baby	Tom McGrath	DreamWorks Animation; 20th Century Fox	Composed with Steve Mazzaro
2017	Pirates of the Caribbean: Dead Men Tell No Tales	Joachim Rønning; Espen Sandberg	Jerry Bruckheimer Films; Walt Disney Pictures	Themes only with Klaus Badelt; Score composed by Geoff Zanelli
2017	Dunkirk	Christopher Nolan	RatPac Entertainment; Syncopy; Warner Bros.	Nominated–Academy Award for Best Original Score; Nominated–BAFTA Award for Best Film Music; Nominated–Golden Globe Award for Best Original Score; Nominated–Grammy Award for Best Score Soundtrack for Visual Media
2017	Blade Runner 2049	Denis Villeneuve	Scott Free Productions; Thunderbird Entertainment; Torridon Films; 16:14 Entertainment; Alcon Entertainment; Warner Bros. (US); Columbia Pictures (International)	Themes by Vangelis; Replaced Jóhann Jóhannsson; Composed with Benjamin Wallfisch; Nominated–BAFTA Award for Best Film Music; Nominated–Critics' Choice Movie Award for Best Score; Nominated–Grammy Award for Best Score Soundtrack for Visual Media; 1st collaboration with Denis Villeneuve
2018	Widows	Steve McQueen	20th Century Fox; Regency Enterprises	—N/a
2019	Dark Phoenix	Simon Kinberg	Marvel Entertainment; 20th Century Fox	—N/a
2019	The Lion King	Jon Favreau	Fairview Entertainment; Walt Disney Pictures	Returning to score from the 1994 animated film Original songs by Elton John & Tim Rice; Nominated–Grammy Award for Best Score Soundtrack for Visual Media

==== 2020s ====
Year	Title	Director	Studio / Distributor	Notes
2020	Rebuilding Paradise	Ron Howard	National Geographic Documentary Films; Imagine Entertainment	Composed with Lorne Balfe
2020	The SpongeBob Movie: Sponge on the Run	Tim Hill	Paramount+ Paramount Pictures; Paramount Animation; Nickelodeon Movies; United Plankton Pictures; MRC	Composed with Steve Mazzaro
2020	Hillbilly Elegy	Ron Howard	Netflix; Imagine Entertainment	Composed with David Fleming
2020	Wonder Woman 1984	Patty Jenkins	DC Comics; Atlas Entertainment; The Stone Quarry; Warner Bros.	Replaced Rupert Gregson-Williams
2021	The Boss Baby: Family Business	Tom McGrath	DreamWorks Animation; Universal Pictures	Composed with Steve Mazzaro
2021	Dune	Denis Villeneuve	Warner Bros. Legendary Entertainment; Villeneuve Films	Academy Award for Best Original Score; BAFTA Award for Best Original Music; Critics' Choice Movie Award for Best Score; Golden Globe Award for Best Original Score; Nominated–Grammy Award for Best Score Soundtrack for Visual Media; 2nd collaboration with Villeneuve
2021	The Survivor	Barry Levinson	HBO Films; Bron Studios; New Mandate Films; Endeavor Content; Creative Wealth Media	
2021	No Time to Die	Cary Joji Fukunaga	United Artists Releasing (North America); Universal Pictures (International); Metro-Goldwyn-Mayer; Eon Productions	Replaced Dan Romer
2021	Army of Thieves	Matthias Schweighöfer	Netflix; The Stone Quarry; Pantaleon Films	Composed with Steve Mazzaro
2021	The Unforgivable	Nora Fingscheidt	Netflix; GK Films; Fortis Films; Construction Film GmbH	Composed with David Fleming
2022	Top Gun: Maverick	Joseph Kosinski	Don Simpson/Jerry Bruckheimer Films; Skydance Media; TC Productions; Paramount Pictures	Composed with Harold Faltermeyer and Lady Gaga
2022	The Son	Florian Zeller	Film4; See-Saw Films; Ingenious Media; Embankment Films; Orange Studio	
2023	Are You There God? It's Me, Margaret.	Kelly Fremon Craig	Lionsgate; Gracie Films	
2023	The Creator	Gareth Edwards	20th Century Studios; Regency Enterprises eOne Films; New Regency	
2024	Dune: Part Two	Denis Villeneuve	Warner Bros. Legendary Entertainment; Villeneuve Films	Grammy Award for Best Score Soundtrack for Visual Media; Nominated–Critics' Choice Movie Award for Best Score; Nominated–Golden Globe Award for Best Original Score; 3rd collaboration with Villeneuve
2024	Kung Fu Panda 4	Mike Mitchell	DreamWorks Animation; Universal Pictures	Composed with Steve Mazzaro
2024	Eden	Ron Howard	Imagine Entertainment; AGC Studios	
2024	Blitz	Steve McQueen	Apple Studios; Regency Enterprises; New Regency; Working Title Films; Lammas Park	
2024	Mufasa: The Lion King	Barry Jenkins	Walt Disney Studios Motion Pictures	Provided the track "And So It's Time"
2025	Fateh	Sonu Sood	Shakti Sagar Productions; Zee Studios	Provided the track "To the Moon"
2025	F1	Joseph Kosinski	Warner Bros. Pictures; Apple Studios; Jerry Bruckheimer Films; Plan B Entertainment; Dawn Apollo Films; Monolith Pictures	Also produced and wrote songs in the film's soundtrack Nominated–Critics' Choice Movie Award for Best Score; Nominated–Golden Globe Award for Best Original Score
2025	Ella McCay	James L. Brooks	20th Century Studios; Gracie Films	
2026	The Last Photograph	Zack Snyder	The Stone Quarry; Telecinco Cinema; Hollywood Gang Productions	Composed with Omer Benyamin and Steven Doar
2026	Ramayana: Part 1	Nitesh Tiwari	Prime Focus Studios; Monster Mind Creations	Indian film Composed with A. R. Rahman
2026	Dune: Part Three	Denis Villeneuve	Warner Bros. Pictures; Legendary Entertainment; Villeneuve Films	
2027	Ramayana: Part 2	Nitesh Tiwari	Prime Focus Studios; Monster Mind Creations	Indian film Composed with A. R. Rahman; Filming

=== Short films ===
Year	Title	Director	Studio / Publisher	Notes
1986	Vardo	Matthew Jacobs	—N/a	—N/a
1990	Arcadia	Paul Bamborough	Channel Four Films; Working Title Films	—N/a
1991	To the Moon, Alice	Jessie Nelson	Chanticleer Films	—N/a
2008	Secrets of the Furious Five	Raman Hui	DreamWorks Animation	Composed with Henry Jackman and John Powell; Annie Award for Best Music in an Animated Television Production or Short Form
2011	Megamind: The Button of Doom	Simon J. Smith	DreamWorks Animation; Pacific Data Images	Composed with Lorne Balfe
2011	Kung Fu Panda: Secrets of the Masters	Tony Leondis	DreamWorks Animation	Composed with Lorne Balfe and John Powell
2012	The Longest Daycare	David Silverman	Gracie Films; Film Roman; 20th Century Fox	The Simpsons animated short Composed with James Dooley
2016	Kung Fu Panda: Secrets of the Scroll	Rodolphe Guenoden	DreamWorks Animation	Composed with Lorne Balfe and John Powell

=== Television ===
Year	Title	Notes
1985	Wild Horses	Television film
1987	Comeback	
1987	Going for Gold	With Sandy McClelland
1988	First Born	Miniseries
1992	Millennium: Tribal Wisdom and the Modern World	Miniseries
1993	Lifepod	Television film Theme music only Score composed by Mark Mancina
1993–1994	Space Rangers	Theme music only Score composed by Mark Mancina and John Van Tongeren
1994–1995	The Critic	Theme music only Score composed by Alf Clausen
2000–2001	Die Motorrad-Cops – Hart am Limit	Theme music only Score composed by Matthias Weber, Justin Burnett, James S. Levine and Geoff Zanelli
2000–present	Sesame Street	Providing instrumental accompaniment for the show since 2000
2010	The Pacific	Miniseries Composed with Geoff Zanelli and Blake Neely; Nominated–Primetime Emmy Award for Outstanding Music Composition for a Miniseries, Movie or a Special
2011–2016	Through the Wormhole	Docuseries; Composed with Jacob Shea
2011	Curiosity	Documentary series; 1 episode
2013	The Bible	Miniseries; Composed with Lisa Gerrard and Lorne Balfe
2015	Premier Boxing Champions	Boxing program
2015	Sons of Liberty	Miniseries; Theme music only Score composed by Lorne Balfe
2015	A.D. The Bible Continues	Music director only Score composed by Lorne Balfe
2016	Planet Earth II	Docuseries; 6 episodes Composed with Jasha Klebe and Jacob Shea; Nominated–BAFTA Award for Best Original Music
2016	The Crown	Theme music only
2017	Genius	Theme music only Score composed by Lorne Balfe; Nominated–Primetime Emmy Award for Outstanding Main Title Theme Music
2017	Blue Planet II	Documentary series; 7 episodes Composed with David Fleming and Jacob Shea
2018	Believer	Documentary film Composed with Dan Reynolds
2019	Seven Worlds, One Planet	Documentary series; 7 episodes Composed with Jacob Shea
2021	Around the World in 80 Days	Theme music only Score composed by Christian Lundberg
2022–2023	Prehistoric Planet	Docuseries; 10 episodes Theme music composed with Andrew James Christie; Score composed with Anže Rozman and Kara Talve; Nominated–Primetime Emmy Award for Outstanding Music Composition for a Documentary Series or Special (Original Dramatic Score)
2022	Frozen Planet II	Documentary series; 6 episodes Theme music composed with Anže Rozman; Score composed with Adam Lukas and James Everingham
2022	The Calling	Composed with Steve Mazzaro
2022	The Night Logan Woke Up	Composed with David Fleming
2023	Planet Earth III	Docuseries; 8 episodes Composed with Jacob Shea and Sara Barone; Nominated–Primetime Emmy Award for Outstanding Music Composition for a Documentary Series or Special (Original Dramatic Score)
2024	The Tattooist of Auschwitz	Composed with Kara Talve; Nominated–Primetime Emmy Award for Outstanding Music Composition for a Limited or Anthology Series, Movie or Special (Original Dramatic Score); Nominated–Primetime Emmy Award for Outstanding Original Music and Lyrics – "Love Will Survive"
2024	Virdee	Theme music composed with James Everingham
2024	Twilight of the Gods	Composed with Omer Benyamin and Steven Doar
2025	The Americas	Docuseries; 11 episodes Theme music composed with Andrew James Christie; Score composed with Anže Rozman and Kara Talve
2025	Chief of War	Composed with James Everingham
2026	Euphoria (season 3)	
2026	Lord of the Flies	Theme music composed with Kara Talve Score composed by Cristobal Tapia de Veer
2026	The Bear	Score producer: season 5; 8 episodes Score composed by Christian Lundberg of Bleeding Fingers Music
2026–present	Harry Potter	Composed with Kara Talve and Anže Rozman
TBA	All the Sinners Bleed	Composed with Kara Talve and Anže Rozman

=== Video games ===
Year	Title	Studio / Publisher	Notes
2007	The Simpsons Game	Electronic Arts	Composed with James Dooley, Christopher Lennertz and Tim Wynn
2009	Call of Duty: Modern Warfare 2	Activision	Main themes only Score composed by Lorne Balfe
2011	Crysis 2	Electronic Arts	Theme music only Score composed by Lorne Balfe, Tilman Sillescu and Borislav Slavov
2011	Skylanders: Spyro's Adventure	Activision	Main themes only Score composed by Lorne Balfe
2015	Arena of Valor	TiMi Studios	Composed with Jeff Broadbent and Matthew Carl Earl
2018	FIFA 19	Electronic Arts	Composed with Lorne Balfe
2024	Dragon Age: The Veilguard	Electronic Arts	Composed with Lorne Balfe
TBA	Ashfall	NetEase Games	Composed with Inon Zur and Steve Mazzaro

== As soundtrack producer ==
=== 1980s ===
Year	Title	Composer(s)	Director	Notes
1987	The Last Emperor	Cong Su, Ryuichi Sakamoto & David Byrne	Bernardo Bertolucci	—N/a

=== 1990s ===
Year	Title	Composer(s)	Director(s)	Notes
1992	Memoirs of an Invisible Man	Shirley Walker	John Carpenter	Synthesist
1993	Batman: Mask of the Phantasm	Shirley Walker	Bruce Timm; Eric Radomski	Synthesist
1994	Speed	Mark Mancina	Jan de Bont	—N/a
1996	Twister	Mark Mancina	Jan de Bont	—N/a
1996	White Squall	Jeff Rona	Ridley Scott	—N/a
1997	Face/Off	John Powell	John Woo	—N/a
1997	The Borrowers	Harry Gregson-Williams	Peter Hewitt	—N/a
1998	Antz	Harry Gregson-Williams; John Powell	Eric Darnell; Tim Johnson	—N/a
1998	Armageddon	Trevor Rabin; Harry Gregson-Williams; Steve Jablonsky; Don L. Harper; John Van Tongeren; Paul Linford	Michael Bay	—N/a
1998	With Friends Like These...	John Powell	Philip Frank Messina	—N/a
1999	Endurance	John Powell	Leslie Woodhead; Bud Greenspan	—N/a

=== 2000s ===
Year	Title	Composer(s)	Director(s)	Notes
2001	I Am Sam	John Powell	Jessie Nelson	—N/a
2002	Live from Baghdad	Steve Jablonsky	Mick Jackson	Executive score producer
2004	House of D	Geoff Zanelli	David Duchovny	Executive score producer
2004	Ella Enchanted	Nick Glennie-Smith	Tommy O'Haver	Executive score producer
2005	All the Invisible Children	Ramin Djawadi	Jordan Scott; Ridley Scott	Segment: "Jonathan"
2005	The Island	Steve Jablonsky	Michael Bay	—N/a
2005	Blood+	Mark Mancina	Junichi Fujisaku	Volumes 1 and 2
2005	Wallace & Gromit: The Curse of the Were-Rabbit	Julian Nott	Nick Park; Steve Box	—N/a
2006	Ask the Dust	Heitor Pereira & Ramin Djawadi	Robert Towne	—N/a
2006	Curious George	Heitor Pereira	Matthew O'Callaghan	Executive score producer
2006	Over the Hedge	Rupert Gregson-Williams	Tim Johnson; Karey Kirkpatrick	Executive score producer
2006	The Prestige	David Julyan	Christopher Nolan	Executive score producer
2006	Urmel Aus Dem Eis	James Dooley	Reinhard Klooss; Holger Tappe	—N/a
2007	August Rush	Mark Mancina	Kirsten Sheridan	—N/a
2007	Bee Movie	Rupert Gregson-Williams	Simon J. Smith	—N/a
2008	Vantage Point	Atli Örvarsson	Pete Travis	—N/a
2008	Babylon A.D.	Atli Örvarsson	Mathieu Kassovitz	Executive score producer
2008	Running the Sahara	Heitor Pereira	James Moll	Documentary
2008	Iron Man	Ramin Djawadi	Jon Favreau	Executive music producer
2009	Monsters vs. Aliens	Henry Jackman	Conrad Vernon; Rob Letterman	Executive music producer
2009	Henri 4	Henry Jackman	Jo Baier	Executive music producer

=== 2010s ===
Year	Title	Composer(s)	Director(s)	Notes
2010	Despicable Me	Heitor Pereira & Pharrell Williams	Pierre Coffin; Chris Renaud	—N/a
2013	Hansel & Gretel: Witch Hunters	Atli Örvarsson	Tommy Wirkola	—N/a
2013	Beyond: Two Souls	Lorne Balfe	David Cage	Video game
2013	Bullet to the Head	Steve Mazzaro	Walter Hill	—N/a
2014	Divergent	Junkie XL	Neil Burger	—N/a
2015	Auschwitz	Benjamin Wallfisch	James Moll	Documentary short
2015	Terminator Genisys	Lorne Balfe	Alan Taylor	Executive music producer
2016	13 Hours: The Secret Soldiers of Benghazi	Lorne Balfe	Michael Bay	Executive music producer
2016	The Edge of Seventeen	Atli Örvarsson	Kelly Fremon Craig	—N/a
2017	Rings	Matthew Margeson	F. Javier Gutiérrez	Executive music producer
2018	Smallfoot	Heitor Pereira	Karey Kirkpatrick	Executive music producer

=== 2020s ===
Year	Title	Composer	Director	Notes
2020	The Rhythm Section	Steve Mazzaro	Reed Morano	Executive music producer
2020	Scoob!	Tom Holkenborg	Tony Cervone	—N/a
2022	The Ride To Happiness	Tomorrowland	—N/a	This is a roller coaster in Belgium.
2025	Fixed	Tyler Bates; Joanne Higginbottom	Genndy Tartakovsky	Executive music producer

== As other ==
=== 1980s ===
Year	Title	Composer(s)	Director	Notes
1983	Eureka	Stanley Myers	Nicolas Roeg	Composer: Additional music
1986	Castaway	Stanley Myers	Nicolas Roeg	Composer: Additional music
1988	Prisoner of Rio	Luiz Bonfá & Luciano Perrone	Lech Majewski	Composer: Additional music

=== 1990s ===
Year	Title	Composer	Director	Notes
1991	White Fang	Basil Poledouris	Randal Kleiser	Composer: Additional music
1993	Sniper	Gary Chang	Luis Llosa	Composer: Additional music
1996	White Squall	Jeff Rona	Ridley Scott	Composer: Additional music
1997	Smilla's Sense of Snow	Harry Gregson-Williams	Bille August	Composer: Additional music

=== 2000s ===
Year	Title	Composer(s)	Director	Notes
2003	Johnny English	Edward Shearmur	Peter Howitt	Composer: 'A Man for All Seasons'
2005	The Ring Two	Henning Lohner & Martin Tillman	Hideo Nakata	Composer: Themes
2007	August Rush	Mark Mancina	Kirsten Sheridan	Composer: Additional music
2009	Transformers: Revenge of the Fallen	Steve Jablonsky	Michael Bay	Composer: Additional music

=== 2010s ===
Year	Title	Composer	Director	Notes
2014	Transformers: Age of Extinction	Steve Jablonsky	Michael Bay	Composer: Additional music

== Live albums ==
Year	Title	Label	Notes
2001	The Wings of a Film	Decca	Recorded at the Flanders International Film Festival, October 2000.
2017	Live in Prague	Eagle Records	Recorded May 2016. SNEP: Gold
2023	Hans Zimmer Live	Sony Music	Recorded during his 2022 European concert tour of the same name.
2027	Hans Zimmer Live – The Next Level	Sony Classical	

== Charted and certified songs ==
List of charted and certified songs, with selected chart positions and certifications, showing year released and album name
Title	Year	Peak chart positions										Certifications	Album
Title	Year	GER	AUS	CAN	FRA	IRE	NZ	SWE	UK	US Bub.	WW	Certifications	Album
"God Yu Tekem Laef Blong Mi"	1999	—	—	—	60	—	—	—	—	—	—		The Thin Red Line
"Chevaliers de Sangreal"	2006	—	—	—	158	—	—	—	—	—	—		The Da Vinci Code
"Hoist the Colors"	2007	—	—	—	—	—	—	—	—	7	—		Pirates of the Caribbean: At World's End
"Drink Up Me Hearties Yo Ho"	2007	90	—	—	—	—	—	—	81	—	—		Pirates of the Caribbean: At World's End
"Spider-Pig"	2007	—	—	—	—	3	8	53	23	—	—		The Simpsons Movie: The Music
"Time"	2010	—	—	—	—	—	—	—	—	—	—	BPI: Platinum; RMNZ: Gold	Inception
"Rise"	2012	—	—	—	196	97	—	—	—	—	—		The Dark Knight Rises
"Aurora"	2012	—	—	—	—	97	—	—	—	19	—		Non-album single
"What Are You Going to Do When You Are Not Saving the World?"	2013	—	—	—	—	75	—	—	96	—	—		Man of Steel
"Cornfield Chase"	2016	—	—	—	123	—	—	—	—	—	—	RIAA: Gold; BPI: Gold; RMNZ: Gold	Interstellar
"S.T.A.Y."	2016	—	—	—	93	—	—	—	—	—	—		Interstellar
"No Time for Caution"	2016	—	—	—	196	—	—	—	—	—	—		Interstellar
"Time (Alan Walker Remix)" (with Alan Walker)	2020	—	—	—	—	—	—	—	— (Note: "Time (Alan Walker Remix)" did not enter the UK Singles Chart, but peaked at number 100 on the UK Singles Downloads chart.)	— (Note: "Time (Alan Walker Remix)" did not enter the Bubbling Under Hot 100, but peaked at number 35 on the Hot Dance/Electronic Songs chart.)	—		Non-album single
"Main Titles (You've Been Called Back to Top Gun)" (with Lorne Balfe, Harold Faltermeyer, and Lady Gaga)	2022	—	—	—	—	—	— (Note: "Main Titles (You've Been Called Back to Top Gun)" did not enter the Official Top 40 Singles Chart, but peaked at number 33 on the Hot Singles Sales chart.)	—	— (Note: "Main Titles (You've Been Called Back to Top Gun)" did not enter the UK Singles Chart, but peaked at number 27 on the UK Singles Sales chart.)	— (Note: "Main Titles (You've Been Called Back to Top Gun)" did not enter the Bubbling Under Hot 100, but peaked at number 29 on the Digital Song Sales chart.)	—		Top Gun: Maverick
"Top Gun Anthem" (with Lorne Balfe, Harold Faltermeyer, and Lady Gaga)	2022	—	—	—	—	—	—	—	— (Note: "Top Gun Anthem" did not enter the UK Singles Chart, but peaked at number 77 on the UK Singles Sales chart.)	— (Note: "Top Gun Anthem" did not enter the Bubbling Under Hot 100, but peaked at number 11 on the Rock Digital Song Sales chart.)	—		Top Gun: Maverick
"Click Clack Symphony" (Raye featuring Hans Zimmer)	2026	53	42	63	116	16	40	55	11	2	68	BPI: Silver	This Music May Contain Hope
"—" denotes a recording that did not chart.

== As contributor ==
Albums by other musicians, featuring guest appearances by Zimmer. Sorted chronologically.

- 1980: The Damned, "The History of the World (Part 1)" single, included on The Black Album (additional synthesizers and engineering)
- 1985: Shriekback, Oil and Gold (additional synthesizers and engineering)
- 1985: Who Cares?, "Doctor in Distress" single (synthesizer performance)
- 2024: Andrea Bocelli, "Time to Say Goodbye" single, included on Duets (30th Anniversary) (featured artist and producer)
- 2026: Raye, "Click Clack Symphony" single, included on This Music May Contain Hope (featured artist, composer and producer)
