= Defiance (soundtrack) =

Defiance (Original Motion Picture Soundtrack)

Film score by James Newton Howard
- Released: January 6, 2009
- Recorded: 2008
- Studio: Abbey Road Studios, London; James Newton Howard Studios, Santa Monica, California
- Genre: Film score
- Length: 49:47
- Label: Sony Classical
- Producer: James Newton Howard; Jim Weidman

James Newton Howard chronology
The Dark Knight (2008)	Defiance (2009)	Confessions of a Shopaholic (2009)

Defiance (Original Motion Picture Soundtrack) is the film score to the 2008 film Defiance directed by Edward Zwick, starring Daniel Craig, Liev Schreiber, Jamie Bell and George MacKay. The film score is composed by James Newton Howard and consists of orchestral performances by the London Symphony Orchestra and violin solos performed by Joshua Bell. The score was released under the Sony Classical Records label on January 6, 2009.

== Development ==
James Newton Howard, who previously collaborated with Zwick on Blood Diamond (2006), composed the score for Defiance. Howard noted that the film was also a reflection of his story, recalling his identity as Jews was concealed until his mid-30s, and "as [he] became more immersed in the movie, it became more meaningful as it went on". He noted that most composers were scared to score an emotionally specific film due to the skepticism regarding its sentimentality and noted on the use of melody to construct the score which became the basis of the film's sound.

Initially, he was concerned about constructing the sound for the film, where he wanted a violin. Hence, he contacted violinist Joshua Bell to play as a soloist. Reminiscent of how John Williams wrote the score for Schindler's List (1993) only with solo violin, Howard was inspired to write the score with the same approach albeit doing in a way that "won't feel like I'm stealing from Schindler's List". With both Defiance and Schindler's List, having different plot, he noted the use of violin served as the core of the soul of the three brothers, and it established the emotional bond between them. He recorded the score at the Abbey Road Studios in London.

== Release ==
Prior to the soundtrack release, the complete score featuring fifteen tracks was released as a promotional CD by Paramount Vantage as a part of their For Your Consideration campaign for the 2008–09 film awards season. The album was released through Sony Classical Records on January 6, 2009.

== Reception ==
Christian Clemmensen of Filmtracks wrote "the only general weakness of Howard's score is the fragmentation of the score's themes; with so many identities at work in Defiance, he doesn't quite wrap them into a package that would allow one to truly define the spirit of the picture. The theme performed by Bell is the closest such identity, though its placement on album is perhaps too slight to make a memorable punch. Otherwise, Defiance is a gorgeous score that requires close attention, excessive volume for many of its softer cues, and an appreciation of emotionally charged violin ostinatos and thematic performances that may border on cliche (but function well nevertheless)." Thomas Glorieux of Maintitles wrote "It's dramatic, at times heartfelt and works wonders in the film, but without the remainder of the score (and action sound), it tends to lose its dramatic effect."

Jonathan Broxton of Movie Music UK wrote "Defiance is a truly outstanding score, easily of the best ten of 2008, and is a worthy recipient of the critical praise it has received. Whether the casual listener can withstand just under an hour of solemn, somber string writing depends on what they expect their film scores to provide; personally, I find Bell's performances intoxicating, and Howard's thematic strength exceptionally appealing." Adrian Edwards of Gramophone wrote "The music as a whole is restrained and respectful of its story but the heart is seldom touched in the manner that Perlman, Williams and Spielberg conveyed to us in their compassionate response to similar terrible events."

Chris Bumbray of JoBlo.com wrote "Probably my only beef with Defiance is the over the top musical score by James Newton Howard, who's usually one of my favorite composers, but here delivers your typical War movie score, meaning that it's alternately too bombastic, melodramatic, or both. Still, this is a relatively small problem, and the score was never bad enough to interfere with my enjoyment of the film." Josh Rosenblatt of The Austin Chronicle wrote "Standing in for the first impulse is composer James Newton Howard, who never met a tender moment he didn't want to choke to death and who nearly drowns Defiance in symphonic syrup". Todd McCarthy of Variety wrote "James Newton Howard's violin-dominated score provides mournfully moody dramatic backing."

David Denby of The New Yorker noted that the film "could have done with less of James Newton Howard's music, which pounds away at us when the action starts up and turns cloyingly plaintive at times of mourning (Joshua Bell plays a lachrymose violin theme)." Niall Browne of Collider wrote "James Newton Howard's musical score is excellent and haunting—but it sounds too much like his music from The Village". R. L. Shaffer of IGN wrote "James Newton Howard's poetically impacting score is perfectly blended, adding much emotion to the picture."

== Track listing ==
No.	Title	Length
1.	"Defiance Main Titles"	2:27
2.	"Survivors"	2:11
3.	"Make Them Count"	2:40
4.	"Your Wife"	3:07
5.	"The Bielski Otriad"	5:17
6.	"Bella and Zus"	2:16
7.	"Exodus"	4:30
8.	"Camp Montage"	2:22
9.	"The Wedding"	1:36
10.	"Winter"	2:02
11.	"Escaping the Ghetto"	1:34
12.	"Police Station"	4:33
13.	"Tuvia Kisses Lilka"	3:17
14.	"Nothing is Impossible"	7:33
15.	"The Bielski Brothers/Ikh Bin A Mame"	4:22
Total length:		49:47

== Personnel ==
Credits adapted from liner notes:

- Music composer – James Newton Howard
- Music producer – James Newton Howard, Jim Weidman
- Recording – Simon Rhodes
- Mixing – Joel Iwataki
- Mastering – David Lai
- Supervising music editor – Jim Weidman
- Music editor – David Olson
- Supervising technical score advisor – Chris P. Bacon
- Technical score advisor – Dave Holden, Matt Ward, Stuart Michael Thomas
- Auricle control systems – Chris Cozens, Richard Grant
- Scoring coordinator – Pamela Sollie
- Copyist – JoAnn Kane Music Service
- Music librarian – Dakota Music, Dave Hage
- Package design – Natalia Nezhdanova

Orchestra

- Orchestrators – Brad Dechter, Jeff Atmajian, Randy Kerber
- Leader – Rosemary Warren-Green
- Conductor – Nick Ingram
- Contractor – Isobel Griffiths
- Assistant contractor – Charlotte Matthews
- Scoring crew – Janik Rajapakse, Pete Hutchings, Richard Lancaster

Instruments

- Bass – Allen Walley, Chris Laurence, Mary Scully, Patrick Lannigan, Stacey Watton, Steve Mair, Steve McManus, Steve Rossell
- Bassoon – Gavin McNaughton, Richard Skinner, Stephen Maw
- Cello – Anthony Lewis, Anthony Pleeth, Chris Worsey, Dave Daniels, Frank Schaefer, Jo Knight, Jonathan Williams, Martin Loveday, Melissa Phelps, Nick Cooper, Paul Kegg
- Clarinet – Anthony Pike, Dave Fuest, Nicholas Bucknall
- Flute – Anna Noakes, Jonathan Snowden, Karen Jones
- Harp – Skaila Kanga
- Horn – David Pyatt, Laurence Davies, Nigel Black, Richard Berry, Richard Bissill, Richard Clews, Richard Watkins, Simon Rayner
- Oboe – David Theodore, Matthew Draper, Sue Bohling
- Percussion – Frank Ricotti, Gary Kettel, Tristan Fry
- Trombone – Andy Wood, Dave Stewart, David Vines, Peter Davies, Richard Edwards
- Trumpet – Dan Newell, Ian Balmain, Kate Moore, Maurice Murphy
- Viola – Andy Parker, Bruce White, Chris Pitsillides, Don McVay, Garfield Jackson, George Robertson, Gustav Clarkson, Jon Thorne, Katie Wilkinson, Morgan Goff, Nick Barry, Peter Lale, Rachel Bolt, Ruşen Güneş, Vicci Wardman
- Violin – Bea Lovejoy, Boguslaw Kostecki, Cathy Thompson, Chris Clad, Chris Tombling, Dai Emanuel, Debbie Widdup, Dermot Crehan, Liz Edwards, Emlyn Singleton, Everton Nelson, Gaby Lester, Jim McLeod, John Bradbury, Jonathan Evans-Jones, Jonathan Rees, Jonathan Strange, Julian Leaper, Kathy Gowers, Maciej Rakowski, Mark Berrow, Mike McMenemy, Natalia Bonner, Patrick Kiernan, Paul Willey, Perry Montague-Mason, Peter Hanson, Ralph De Souza, Rita Manning, Roger Garland, Rolf Wilson, Rose Warren-Green, Simon Baggs, Steve Morris, Thomas Bowes, Tom Pigott-Smith, Warren Zielinski

Soloists

- Cimbalom – Greg Knowles
- Violin – Joshua Bell

== Accolades ==
Award	Category	Recipient	Result	Ref.
Academy Awards	Best Original Score	James Newton Howard	Nominated	
Golden Globe Awards	Best Original Score	James Newton Howard	Nominated	
International Film Music Critics Association	Best Original Score for a Drama Film	James Newton Howard	Nominated	
