= Ambient music design =

Ambient music design is a fusion of original film score and sound design. It has elements of Ambient music and Drone music and is supposed to complement a specific scene or the entire movie, TV-series or video game.

The term was invented by Mel Wesson and Hans Zimmer in early 2000 when working on Hannibal and has since become a niche for Mel Wesson's sound. Mel has also made numerous production music CD's for Extreme Music which feature loosely some of the atmospheric textures in his world of ambient music design.

== Ambient music design featuring Mel Wesson ==
=== Feature films ===
2012

- The Bourne Legacy
- The Dark Knight Rises
- Snow White and the Huntsman

2011

- Green Lantern
- Season of the Witch

2010

- The Tourist
- Inception

2009

- Angels & Demons

2008

- Frost/Nixon
- The Dark Knight
- The Happening

2007

- Michael Clayton
- Transformers
- Pirates of the Caribbean: At World's End

2006

- Blood Diamond
- The Texas Chainsaw Massacre: The Beginning
- Lady in the Water
- Pirates of the Caribbean: Dead Man's Chest
- The Da Vinci Code
- Freedomland

2005

- King Kong
- The Island

2005

- Batman Begins
- The Interpreter

2004

- Thunderbirds
- King Arthur
- Man on Fire

2003

- The Texas Chainsaw Massacre
- The Rundown
- Matchstick Men
- Bad Boys II
- Pirates of the Caribbean: The Curse of the Black Pearl
- Phone Booth
- Tears of the Sun

2002

- Spirit: Stallion of the Cimarron

2001

- Black Hawk Down
- Hannibal

2000

- Mission: Impossible 2

=== Video games ===
2010

- LIMBO

2009

- inFAMOUS

2007

- Call of Duty 4: Modern Warfare

=== Other projects ===
- Inception Live Premiere Performance
- Inception: The App
- Inception: The Soundscape
- The Dark Knight: 2-CD Special Edition
- SOS Short Films: Electroland
- Shrek 4-D Universal Studios Theme Park Ride
- Various TV-series, theatrical teaser trailers, production music CD's, music albums, music videos and commercials

== See also ==
- Mel Wesson (Wikipedia)
