= List of awards and nominations received by Hans Zimmer =

Hans Zimmer awards and nominations
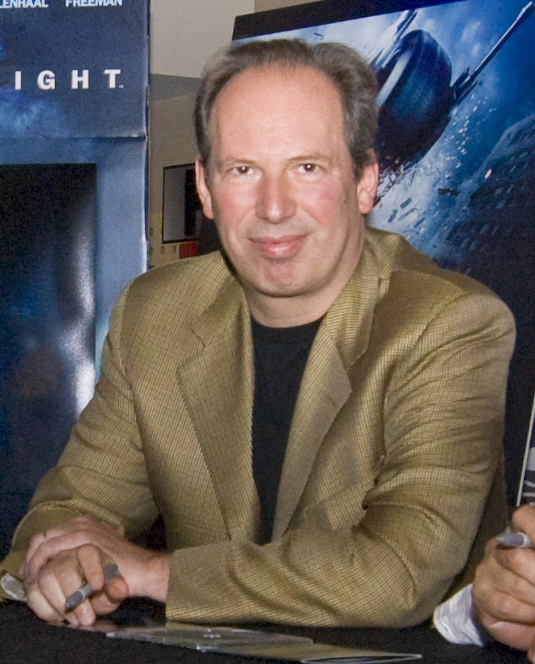
- Zimmer at The Dark Knight premiere in 2008
Awards and nominations
Award	Wins	Nominations
Academy Awards	2	12
Annie Awards	3	6
British Academy Film Awards	1	10
British Academy Games Awards	0	1
British Academy Television Craft Awards	0	1
Classical Brit Awards	4	4
Critic's Choice Movie Awards	2	11
Golden Globe Awards	3	15
Grammy Awards	5	24
Hollywood Music in Media Awards	5	20
Primetime Emmy Awards	0	8
Saturn Awards	3	12
Satellite Awards	5	12
Tony Awards	0	1
Various	5	8
Critics associations	20	70

Totals (Note: Certain award groups do not simply award one winner. They acknowledge several different recipients, have runners-up, and have third place. Since this is a specific recognition and is different from losing an award, runner-up mentions are considered wins in this award tally. For simplification and to avoid errors, each award in this list has been presumed to have had a prior nomination.)
- Wins: 58
- Nominations: 213

Hans Zimmer is a German film composer and record producer. Throughout his career, he has received numerous accolades, including two Academy Awards (out of twelve nominations), a BAFTA Award, two Critics' Choice Movie Award, three Golden Globe Awards, five Grammy Awards as well as nominations for eight Primetime Emmy Awards and a Tony Award.

His first Academy Award nomination came in 1988 for his work in Barry Levinson's drama film Rain Man. In 1994, he scored the animated film The Lion King, for which he won his first Academy Award. He also won the Golden Globe Award for Best Original Score and two Grammy Awards, Best Musical Album for Children for the film's soundtrack and Best Instrumental Arrangement with Accompanying Vocals for the song "Circle of Life". He also received a nomination for the Tony Award for Best Original Score for the musical based on the film.

In 2000, he scored Ridley Scott's historical drama Gladiator alongside Lisa Gerrard. For the film, he received nominations for the Academy Awards, BAFTA Awards and won the Critics' Choice Movie Award for Best Composer, as well as his second Golden Globe Award. In 2008, he collaborated with James Newton Howard for Christopher Nolan's The Dark Knight; their work received several nominations and won a Classical Brit Award and a Grammy Award. He continued collaborating with Nolan, scoring Inception (2009), Interstellar (2014) and Dunkirk (2017); the films gave Zimmer his ninth, tenth and eleventh Academy Award nominations for Best Original Score.

Zimmer has also collaborated with Steve McQueen, in 12 Years a Slave (2013), and Widows (2018), receiving Golden Globe nominations for both films. In 2017, he scored Denis Villeneuve's Blade Runner 2049 alongside Benjamin Wallfisch, receiving a BAFTA Award nomination for the film. In 2019, Zimmer scored the 2019 remake of The Lion King, receiving two Grammy Award nominations. In 2021, he collaborated again with Villeneuve in Dune. For his work, he won various awards from critics associations, including his second Academy Award and his first BAFTA Award; he was also nominated for a Grammy Award.

== Major associations ==
=== Academy Awards ===
The Academy Awards are a set of awards given by the Academy of Motion Picture Arts and Sciences annually for excellence of cinematic achievements. Zimmer has won twice out of twelve nominations.

Year	Category	Nominated work	Result	Ref.
1989	Best Original Score	Rain Man	Nominated	
1995	Best Original Score	The Lion King	Won	
1997	Best Original Score	The Preacher's Wife	Nominated	
1998	Best Original Score	As Good as It Gets	Nominated	
1999	Best Original Score	The Prince of Egypt (shared with Stephen Schwartz)	Nominated	
1999	Best Original Score	The Thin Red Line	Nominated	
2001	Best Original Score	Gladiator	Nominated	
2010	Best Original Score	Sherlock Holmes	Nominated	
2011	Best Original Score	Inception	Nominated	
2015	Best Original Score	Interstellar	Nominated	
2018	Best Original Score	Dunkirk	Nominated	
2022	Best Original Score	Dune	Won	

=== BAFTA Awards ===
The British Academy Film Award is an annual award show presented by the British Academy of Film and Television Arts. The British Academy Television Craft Awards is an annual award show presented by the British Academy of Film and Television Arts to recognize the best in crafts for television productions. The British Academy Games Awards is an annual award show presented by the British Academy of Film and Television Arts to recognize the best in the video game industry.

Year	Category	Nominated work	Result	Ref.
British Academy Film Awards
1992	Best Original Film Score	Thelma & Louise	Nominated	
1995	Anthony Asquith Award for Film Music	The Lion King	Nominated	
2001	Anthony Asquith Award for Film Music	Gladiator (shared with Lisa Gerrard)	Nominated	
2009	Best Music	The Dark Knight (shared with James Newton Howard)	Nominated	
2011	Best Original Music	Inception	Nominated	
2014	Best Original Music	12 Years a Slave	Nominated	
2015	Best Original Music	Interstellar	Nominated	
2018	Best Original Music	Blade Runner 2049 (shared with Benjamin Wallfisch)	Nominated	
2018	Best Original Music	Dunkirk	Nominated	
2022	Best Original Music	Dune	Won	
British Academy Television Awards
2017	Best Original Music	Planet Earth II (shared with Jacob Shea and Jasha Klebe)	Nominated	
British Academy Games Awards
2009	Best Original Score	Call of Duty: Modern Warfare 2 (shared with Lorne Balfe)	Nominated	

=== Emmy Awards ===
The Primetime Emmy Awards are presented annually by the Academy of Television Arts & Sciences, also known as the Television Academy, to recognize and honor achievements in the television industry.

Year	Category	Nominated work	Result	Ref.
Primetime Emmy Awards
2010	Outstanding Music Composition for a Miniseries, Movie, or a Special	The Pacific: Part 10 (shared with Blake Neely and Geoff Zanelli)	Nominated	
2017	Outstanding Original Main Title Theme Music	Genius (shared with Lorne Balfe)	Nominated	
2023	Outstanding Music Composition for a Documentary Series or Special (Original Dramatic Score)	Prehistoric Planet: Badlands (shared with Anže Rozman and Kara Talve)	Nominated	
2024	Outstanding Music Composition for a Documentary Series or Special (Original Dramatic Score)	Planet Earth III: Extremes (shared with Jacob Shea and Sara Barone)	Nominated	
2024	Outstanding Music Composition for a Limited or Anthology Series, Movie or Special (Original Dramatic Score)	The Tattooist of Auschwitz: Episode 1 (shared with Kara Talve)	Nominated	
2024	Outstanding Original Music and Lyrics	"Love Will Survive" from The Tattooist of Auschwitz: Episode 6 (shared with Kara Talve, Walter Afanasieff and Charlie Midnight)	Nominated	
2025	Outstanding Music Composition for a Documentary Series or Special (Original Dramatic Score)	The Americas: Andes (shared with Anže Rozman and Kara Talve)	Nominated	
2026	Outstanding Music Composition for a Documentary/Nonfiction or Reality Program (Original Dramatic Score)	Prehistoric Planet: Ice Age: The Big Freeze (shared with Anže Rozman and Kara Talve)	Nominated	

=== Golden Globe Awards ===
The Golden Globe Award is an accolade bestowed by the 93 members of the Hollywood Foreign Press Association (HFPA) recognizing excellence in film and television, both domestic and foreign.

Year	Category	Nominated work	Result	Ref.
1995	Best Original Score	The Lion King	Won	
1999	Best Original Score	The Prince of Egypt (shared with Stephen Schwartz)	Nominated	
2001	Best Original Score	Gladiator (shared with Lisa Gerrard)	Won	
2002	Best Original Score	Pearl Harbor	Nominated	
2003	Best Original Song	"Here I Am" from Spirit: Stallion of the Cimarron (shared with Gretchen Peters and Bryan Adams)	Nominated	
2004	Best Original Score	The Last Samurai	Nominated	
2005	Best Original Score	Spanglish	Nominated	
2007	Best Original Score	The Da Vinci Code	Nominated	
2009	Best Original Score	Frost/Nixon	Nominated	
2011	Best Original Score	Inception	Nominated	
2014	Best Original Score	12 Years a Slave	Nominated	
2015	Best Original Score	Interstellar	Nominated	
2017	Best Original Score	Hidden Figures (shared with Pharrell Williams and Benjamin Wallfisch)	Nominated	
2018	Best Original Score	Dunkirk	Nominated	
2022	Best Original Score	Dune	Won	
2025	Best Original Score	Dune: Part Two	Nominated	
2026	Best Original Score	F1	Nominated	

=== Grammy Awards ===
The Grammy Award is an annual award show presented by The Recording Academy.

Year	Category	Nominated work	Result	Ref.
1991	Best Instrumental Composition Written for a Motion Picture or for Television	Driving Miss Daisy (End Titles)	Nominated	
1995	Best Instrumental Composition Written for a Motion Picture or for Television	The Lion King	Nominated	
1995	Best Musical Album for Children	The Lion King	Won	
1995	Best Instrumental Arrangement with Accompanying Vocals	"Circle of Life" (shared with Lebo M)	Won	
1996	Best Instrumental Composition Written for a Motion Picture or for Television	Crimson Tide	Won	
2000	Best Soundtrack Album	The Prince of Egypt	Nominated	
2001	Best Score Soundtrack for Visual Media	Gladiator (shared with Lisa Gerrard)	Nominated	
2007	Best Score Soundtrack for Visual Media	The Da Vinci Code	Nominated	
2007	Best Score Soundtrack for Visual Media	Pirates of the Caribbean: Dead Man's Chest	Nominated	
2009	Best Score Soundtrack for Visual Media	The Dark Knight (shared with James Newton Howard)	Won	
2011	Best Score Soundtrack for Visual Media	Inception	Nominated	
2011	Best Score Soundtrack for Visual Media	Sherlock Holmes	Nominated	
2012	Best Score Soundtrack for Visual Media	The Dark Knight Rises	Nominated	
2016	Best Score Soundtrack for Visual Media	Interstellar	Nominated	
2018	Best Score Soundtrack for Visual Media	Dunkirk	Nominated	
2018	Best Score Soundtrack for Visual Media	Hidden Figures (shared with Pharrell Williams and Benjamin Wallfisch)	Nominated	
2019	Best Score Soundtrack for Visual Media	Blade Runner 2049	Nominated	
2020	Best Score Soundtrack for Visual Media	The Lion King	Nominated	
2020	Best Compilation Soundtrack for Visual Media	The Lion King	Nominated	
2022	Best Score Soundtrack for Visual Media	Dune	Nominated	
2023	Best Score Soundtrack for Visual Media	No Time to Die	Nominated	
2023	Best Compilation Soundtrack for Visual Media	Top Gun: Maverick (shared with Lorne Balfe, Harold Faltermeyer and Lady Gaga)	Nominated	
2025	Best Score Soundtrack Album for Visual Media	Dune: Part Two	Won	
2025	Best Song Written for Visual Media	"Love Will Survive" (shared with Walter Afanasieff, Charlie Midnight and Kara Talve)	Nominated	

=== Tony Awards ===
The Tony Awards are presented annually by the American Theatre Wing and The Broadway League to recognize the excellence in live Broadway theatre.

Year	Category	Nominated work	Result	Ref.
1998	Best Original Score	The Lion King (shared with Elton John, Tim Rice, Lebo M, Mark Mancina, Jay Rifkin and Julie Taymor)	Nominated	

== Miscellaneous awards ==
=== Annie Awards ===
The Annie Awards are presented annually by ASIFA-Hollywood to recognize excellence in animation.

Year	Category	Nominated work	Result	Ref.
2000	Outstanding Achievement for Music in a Feature Production	The Road to El Dorado (shared with Elton John, Tim Rice and John Powell)	Nominated	
2005	Outstanding Achievement for Music in a Feature Production	Madagascar	Nominated	
2008	Outstanding Achievement for Music in a Feature Production	Kung Fu Panda (shared with John Powell)	Won	
2008	Outstanding Achievement for Music in an Animated Television/Broadcast Production	Secrets of the Furious Five (shared with Henry Jackman and John Powell)	Won	
2010	Outstanding Achievement for Music in an Animated Television/Broadcast Production	Kung Fu Panda Holiday (shared with Henry Jackman and John Powell)	Nominated	
2016	Outstanding Achievement for Music in a Feature Production	The Little Prince (shared with Richard Harvey and Camille)	Won	

=== Classic Brit Awards ===
The Classic Brit Awards are presented by the British Phonographic Industry.

Year	Category	Nominated work	Result	Ref.
2001	Album of the Year	Gladiator (shared with Lisa Gerrard)	Won	
2009	Album of the Year	The Dark Knight (shared with James Newton Howard)	Won	
2013	Composer of the Year	Himself	Won	
2013	Outstanding Contribution to Music	Himself	Won	

=== Critics' Choice Movie Awards ===
The Critics' Choice Movie Awards are presented annually since 1995 by the Broadcast Film Critics Association for outstanding achievements in the cinema industry.

Year	Category	Nominated work	Result	Ref.
2000	Best Score	Gladiator (shared with Lisa Gerrard); The Road to El Dorado	Won	
2003	Best Score	The Last Samurai	Nominated	
2006	Best Score	The Da Vinci Code	Nominated	
2008	Best Score	The Dark Knight (shared with James Newton Howard)	Nominated	
2009	Best Score	Sherlock Holmes	Nominated	
2010	Best Score	Inception	Nominated	
2013	Best Score	12 Years of Slave	Nominated	
2014	Best Score	Interstellar	Nominated	
2017	Best Score	Blade Runner 2049 (shared with Benjamin Wallfisch)	Nominated	
2017	Best Score	Dunkirk	Nominated	
2021	Best Score	Dune	Won	
2024	Best Score	Dune: Part Two	Nominated	
2025	Best Score	F1	Nominated	

=== Hollywood Music in Media Awards ===
The Hollywood Music in Media Awards (HMMA) in an organization that honours the best in original music for media.

Year	Category	Nominated work	Result	Ref.
2010	Best Original Score in a Feature Film	Inception	Won	
2014	Best Original Score in a Feature Film	Interstellar	Nominated	
2016	Best Original Score in an Animated Film	The Little Prince (shared with Richard Harvey)	Nominated	
2016	Best Main Title Theme – TV Show/Digital Streaming Series	The Crown	Nominated	
2016	Best Song/Score - Mobile Video Game	Ngame (shared with Lorne Balfe)	Nominated	
2017	Best Original Score in a Sci-Fi/Fantasy/Horror Film	Blade Runner 2049 (shared with Benjamin Wallfisch)	Nominated	
2017	Best Main Title Theme – TV Show/Limited Series	Genius (shared with Lorne Balfe)	Nominated	
2017	Best Original Score in an Animated Film	The Boss Baby (shared with Steve Mazzaro)	Nominated	
2018	Best Original Score in a Feature Film	Widows	Nominated	
2019	Best Original Score in a Sci-Fi/Fantasy Film	Dark Phoenix	Nominated	
2020	Best Original Score in a Sci-Fi/Fantasy Film	Wonder Woman 1984	Nominated	
2020	Best Original Song/Score — Trailer	Dune (shared with Stephanie Koury and Roger Waters)	Won	
2020	Best Original Song in a TV Show/Limited Series	"Out There" from Seven Worlds, One Planet (shared with Christopher Braide and Sia)	Nominated	
2021	Best Original Score in a Feature Film	No Time to Die	Nominated	
2021	Best Original Score in a Sci-Fi/Fantasy Film	Dune	Won	
2022	Best Original Song/Score — Documentary Series - TV/Digital	Prehistoric Planet (shared with Anze Rozman and Kara Talve)	Won	
2022	Best Original Song/Score — Trailer	"Take Me Back Home" from Frozen Planet II (shared with Camila Cabello, Anže Rozman and Russell Emanuel)	Won	
2022	Best Soundtrack Album	Top Gun: Maverick (shared with Lady Gaga, OneRepublic, Harold Faltermeyer, Lorne Balfe, Kenny Loggins and Miles Teller)	Nominated	
2024	Best Original Score in a Feature Film	Blitz	Nominated	
2024	Best Original Score in a Sci-Fi/Fantasy Film	Dune: Part Two	Won	
2024	Best Original Score in a TV Show/Limited Series	The Tattooist of Auschwitz (shared with Kara Talve)	Nominated	
2024	Best Original Song in a TV Show/Limited Series	"Love Will Survive" from The Tattooist of Auschwitz (shared with Kara Talve, Walter Afanasieff and Charlie Midnight)	Won	
2024	Best Original Song/Score – Mobile Video Game	Call of Duty: Mobile (shared with Yan Xiaonan, Qishan Zhang, and Liu Siqing; Production Team: TiMi J３ Studio/TiMi Audio Lab)	Nominated	

=== Saturn Awards ===
The Saturn Awards are presented by the Academy of Science Fiction, Fantasy and Horror Films.

Year	Category	Nominated work	Result	Ref.
1992	Best Music	Toys (shared with Trevor Horn)	Nominated	
1995	Best Music	Crimson Tide	Nominated	
1996	Best Music	The Rock (shared with Nick Glennie-Smith and Harry Gregson-Williams)	Nominated	
1998	Best Music	The Prince of Egypt	Nominated	
2000	Best Music	Gladiator (shared with Lisa Gerrard)	Nominated	
2000	Best Music	The Road to El Dorado (shared with John Powell)	Nominated	
2005	Best Music	Batman Begins (shared with James Newton Howard)	Nominated	
2008	Best Music	The Dark Knight (shared with James Newton Howard)	Won	
2009	Best Music	Sherlock Holmes	Nominated	
2010	Best Music	Inception	Won	
2012	Best Music	The Dark Knight Rises	Nominated	
2014	Best Music	Interstellar	Won	
2025	Best Music	Dune: Part Two	Nominated	

=== Satellite Awards ===
The Satellite Awards are a set of annual awards given by the International Press Academy.

Year	Category	Nominated work	Result	Ref.
1998	Best Original Score	The Thin Red Line	Won	
2000	Best Original Score	Gladiator	Won	
2001	Best Original Score	Hannibal	Nominated	
2003	Best Original Score	The Last Samurai	Won	
2006	Best Original Score	The Da Vinci Code	Nominated	
2010	Best Original Score	Inception	Won	
2013	Best Original Score	12 Years a Slave	Nominated	
2014	Best Original Score	Interstellar	Nominated	
2016	Best Original Score	Hidden Figures (shared with Pharrell Williams and Benjamin Wallfisch)	Nominated	
2017	Best Original Score	Dunkirk	Nominated	
2018	Best Original Score	Widows	Nominated	
2021	Best Original Score	Dune	Won	
2024	Best Original Score	Dune: Part Two	Nominated	

== Various awards and nominations ==
Year	Association	Category	Nominated work	Result	Ref.
2001	ARIA Music Awards	Best Original Soundtrack Production Recording	Gladiator (shared with Lisa Gerrard)	Nominated	
2003	National Board of Review Awards	Career Achievement - Music Composition	Himself	Won	
2013	Stockholm International Film Festival	Best Film Score	12 Years a Slave	Won	
2014	Black Reel Awards	Best Original Score	12 Years a Slave	Won	
2014	Huading Awards	Lifetime Achievement Award	Himself	Won	
2015	Black Reel Awards	Best Original or Adapted Song	"It's On Again" from The Amazing Spider-Man 2 (shared with Pharrell Williams, Alicia Keys, Kendrick Lamar)	Nominated	
2016	Stephen Hawking Medal for Science Communication		Himself	Won	
2017	Black Reel Awards	Best Original Score	Hidden Figures (shared with Pharrell Williams and Benjamin Wallfisch)	Nominated	

== Critics associations ==
Year	Association	Category	Nominated work	Result	Ref.
1994	Chicago Film Critics Association Awards	Best Original Score	The Lion King	Won	
1998	Online Film Critics Society Awards	Best Original Score	The Prince of Egypt	Nominated	
2000	Chicago Film Critics Association Awards	Best Original Score	Gladiator (shared with Lisa Gerrard)	Nominated	
2000	Online Film Critics Society Awards	Best Original Score	Gladiator (shared with Lisa Gerrard)	Nominated	
2004	Phoenix Film Critics Society Awards	Best Original Score	The Last Samurai	Nominated	
2004	Online Film Critics Society Awards	Best Original Score	The Last Samurai	Nominated	
2005	Chicago Film Critics Association Awards	Best Original Score	Batman Begins (shared with James Newton Howard)	Nominated	
2005	Online Film Critics Society Awards	Best Original Score	Batman Begins (shared with James Newton Howard)	Nominated	
2008	Austin Film Critics Association Awards	Best Original Score	The Dark Knight (shared with James Newton Howard)	Won	
2008	Chicago Film Critics Association Awards	Best Original Score	The Dark Knight (shared with James Newton Howard)	Nominated	
2008	Houston Film Critics Society Awards	Best Original Score	The Dark Knight (shared with James Newton Howard)	Nominated	
2008	Online Film Critics Society Awards	Best Original Score	The Dark Knight (shared with James Newton Howard)	Nominated	
2008	St. Louis Gateway Film Critics Association Awards	Best Music	The Dark Knight (shared with James Newton Howard)	Nominated	
2009	Houston Film Critics Society Awards	Best Original Score	Sherlock Holmes	Nominated	
2010	Alliance of Women Film Journalists Awards	Best Film Music or Score	Inception	Nominated	
2010	Chicago Film Critics Association	Best Original Score	Inception	Nominated	
2010	Houston Film Critics Society	Best Original Score	Inception	Won	
2010	Las Vegas Film Critics Society Awards	Best Original Score	Inception	Nominated	
2010	Phoenix Film Critics Society Awards	Best Original Score	Inception	Won	
2010	St. Louis Gateway Film Critics Association Awards	Best Music	Inception	Runner-up	
2010	Washington D.C. Area Film Critics Association	Best Score	Inception	Won	
2012	Denver Film Critics Society Awards	Best Original Score	The Dark Knight Rises	Won	
2012	St. Louis Gateway Film Critics Association Awards	Best Music	The Dark Knight Rises	Nominated	
2013	Indiana Film Journalists Awards	Best Score	Rush	Nominated	
2013	San Diego Film Critics Society Awards	Best Original Score	Rush	Nominated	
2013	Denver Film Critics Society Awards	Best Original Score	Man of Steel	Nominated	
2013	Georgia Film Critics Association Awards	Best Original Score	Man of Steel	Nominated	
2013	Houston Film Critics Society Awards	Best Original Score	Man of Steel	Nominated	
2013	Houston Film Critics Society Awards	Best Original Score	12 Years a Slave	Nominated	
2013	Alliance of Women Film Journalists Awards	Best Music or Score	12 Years a Slave	Nominated	
2013	Chicago Film Critics Association Awards	Best Original Score	12 Years a Slave	Won	
2013	San Diego Film Critics Society Awards	Best Original Score	12 Years a Slave	Nominated	
2013	St. Louis Gateway Film Critics Association Awards	Best Musical Score	12 Years a Slave	Won	
2013	Washington D.C. Area Film Critics Association Awards	Best Score	12 Years a Slave	Won	
2014	Chicago Film Critics Association Awards	Best Original Score	Interstellar	Nominated	
2014	Dallas–Fort Worth Film Critics Association Awards	Best Original Score	Interstellar	Won	
2014	Florida Film Critics Circle Awards	Best Score	Interstellar	Nominated	
2014	Houston Film Critics Society Awards	Best Original Score	Interstellar	Nominated	
2014	St. Louis Gateway Film Critics Association Awards	Best Musical Score	Interstellar	Nominated	
2014	Washington D.C. Area Film Critics Association Awards	Best Score	Interstellar	Nominated	
2017	Austin Film Critics Association Awards	Best Original Score	Dunkirk	Nominated	
2017	Chicago Film Critics Association Awards	Best Original Score	Dunkirk	Nominated	
2017	Dallas–Fort Worth Film Critics Association Awards	Best Musical Score	Dunkirk	Runner-up	
2017	Florida Film Critics Circle Awards	Best Score	Dunkirk	Runner-up	
2017	Georgia Film Critics Association Awards	Best Original Score	Dunkirk	Won	
2017	Houston Film Critics Society Awards	Best Original Score	Dunkirk	Nominated	
2017	London Film Critics Circle Awards	Technical Achievement Award	Dunkirk	Nominated	
2017	San Francisco Film Critics Circle Awards	Best Original Score	Dunkirk	Nominated	
2017	Seattle Film Critics Society Awards	Best Original Score	Dunkirk	Nominated	
2017	St. Louis Gateway Film Critics Association Awards	Best Score	Dunkirk	Runner-up	
2017	Washington D.C. Area Film Critics Association Awards	Best Score	Dunkirk	Nominated	
2017	Washington D.C. Area Film Critics Association Awards	Best Score	Blade Runner 2049 (shared with Benjamin Wallfisch)	Nominated	
2017	Chicago Film Critics Association Awards	Best Original Score	Blade Runner 2049 (shared with Benjamin Wallfisch)	Nominated	
2017	Houston Film Critics Society Awards	Best Original Score	Blade Runner 2049 (shared with Benjamin Wallfisch)	Nominated	
2017	San Francisco Film Critics Circle Awards	Best Original Score	Blade Runner 2049 (shared with Benjamin Wallfisch)	Won	
2017	Seattle Film Critics Society Awards	Best Original Score	Blade Runner 2049 (shared with Benjamin Wallfisch)	Nominated	
2017	St. Louis Gateway Film Critics Association Awards	Best Score	Blade Runner 2049 (shared with Benjamin Wallfisch)	Nominated	
2018	Washington D.C. Area Film Critics Association Awards	Best Score	Widows	Nominated	
2021	Atlanta Film Critics Circle Awards	Best Score	Dune	Won	
2021	Washington D.C. Area Film Critics Association Awards	Best Score	Dune	Won	
2021	Boston Online Film Critics Association Awards	Best Score	Dune	Won	
2021	Las Vegas Film Critics Society Awards	Best Score	Dune	Nominated	
2021	St. Louis Gateway Film Critics Association Awards	Best Music Score	Dune	Won	
2021	Chicago Film Critics Association Awards	Best Original Score	Dune	Nominated	
2021	Dallas–Fort Worth Film Critics Association Awards	Best Musical Score	Dune	Won	
2021	Florida Film Critics Circle Awards	Best Score	Dune	Won	
2021	Houston Film Critics Society Awards	Best Original Score	Dune	Won	
2021	San Francisco Bay Area Film Critics Circle Awards	Best Original Score	Dune	Nominated	
2021	Austin Film Critics Association Awards	Best Original Score	Dune	Nominated	
2021	Seattle Film Critics Society Awards	Best Original Score	Dune	Won	
2024	Austin Film Critics Association Awards	Best Original Score	Dune: Part Two	Nominated	
2024	Chicago Film Critics Association Awards	Best Original Score	Dune: Part Two	Nominated	
2024	Florida Film Critics Circle Awards	Best Score	Dune: Part Two	Nominated	
2024	Georgia Film Critics Association Awards	Best Original Score	Dune: Part Two	Runner-up	
2024	Houston Film Critics Society Awards	Best Original Score	Dune: Part Two	Nominated	
2024	International Film Music Critics Association	Best Original Score for a Fantasy/Science Fiction Film	Dune: Part Two	Nominated	
2024	Kansas City Film Critics Circle	Best Original Score	Dune: Part Two	Nominated	
2024	Online Film Critics Society Awards	Best Original Score	Dune: Part Two	Nominated	
2024	St. Louis Film Critics Association Awards	Best Score	Dune: Part Two	Nominated	
