= The Thin Red Line (soundtrack) =

Soundtrack album by Hans Zimmer
- Released: January 12, 1999
- Genre: Soundtrack
- Length: 58:56
- Label: RCA Victor
- Producer: Hans Zimmer

Hans Zimmer chronology
The Prince of Egypt	The Thin Red Line	Chill Factor

Professional ratings
Review scores
Source	Rating
Soundtrack.net	4/5 stars
Filmtracks	3/5 stars

The Thin Red Line is the soundtrack of the 1998 Terrence Malick film of the same name. It was released on January 12, 1999, by RCA Victor. German film composer Hans Zimmer is credited for scoring most of the score along with his studio partner John Powell. The soundtrack was nominated at the 71st Academy Awards for Original Dramatic Score, but lost out to Life Is Beautiful. "Journey to the Line" has become very popular and was used in trailers for Pearl Harbor (Original version of the trailers), Man of Steel (Comic-Con trailer), 12 Years a Slave, and X-Men: Days of Future Past.

== Production ==
Zimmer wrote several hours of music, with several different themes, even before Malick started to shoot the film. The director then played the music on the set, while filming, to get himself, and the rest of the crew and actors in the right frame of mind. Zimmer and collaborator John Powell composed over four hours of music on this film, presumably for the director's original cut of the film. However, when director Terrence Malick re-cut the film down to its current running time of 170 minutes, he chose only a few select pieces of music from Zimmer's and Powell's musical contributions, along with original source music, and much of Zimmer's compositions were cut. The film also features several Melanesian choral songs and chants, performed by the Choir of All Saints from Honiara, only one of which ("God Yu Tekem Laef Blong Mi") is featured on the soundtrack. In addition to the choral music, Zimmer added to his tracks the use of Asian instruments, like the Shakuhachi and the Koto.

In February 2019, an expanded edition of the soundtrack was released by La La Land Records, Fox Music and Sony Music. It consisted of two discs of the music as heard in the film, plus remastered editions of the original score album and the Melanesian choral album. This new edition was limited to 3500 copies.

== Track listing ==
1. The Coral Atoll (8:00)
2. The Lagoon (8:36)
3. Journey to the Line (9:21)
4. Light (7:19)
5. Beam (3:44) (Composed by John Powell)
6. Air (2:21)
7. Stone in My Heart (4:28)
8. The Village (5:52)
9. Silence (5:06)
10. God Yu Tekem Laef Blong Mi (1:58)
11. Sit Back and Relax (2:06) (Composed by Francisco Lupica)
