= Mel Wesson =

- Born: Mel Wesson; 12 February 1952 (age 74)
- Origin: London, England
- Genres: Ambient music design, Film score, Video game score
- Occupations: Ambient Music Designer, Composer
- Instrument: Synthesizer
- Website: MelWesson.com

Mel Wesson (born 12 February 1958) is a British film, TV and video game composer and ambient music designer. He is a highly influential 'musical sound designer' in Hollywood having worked on many blockbuster films, yet his sound is often hard to describe or even identify. He is probably best known for his collaboration work with Hans Zimmer and has contributed with both ambient music design and music to some of last decades biggest Hollywood blockbusters. He has also made numerous production music CDs for Extreme Music which loosely feature some of the atmospheric textures in his world of ambient music design.

On the Inception premiere in Hollywood, Wesson and Zimmer designed an outdoor sound installation using the atmosphere and soundscapes from the movie itself, exclusively for the audience. In Wesson's own words: "Hans wanted the audience to remain within the Inception dreamscape as they left the LA Inception Premiere. In order to achieve this I put together a 40-minute soundscape designed to surround the audience as they followed the mirrored walkway from the Gaumans Chinese Theatre in Hollywood to the nearby after-show reception. The soundscape comprised of ambience from the movie, together with a few well chosen FX from Inception sound designer Richard King."

== Early life and career ==
Wesson was born and raised in London, England. Despite numerous efforts to persuade him to follow a more conventional musical path he gravitated towards the synthesizer as his instrument of choice.

After leaving art college the formative stages of Wesson's career saw him touring and recording with a number of new wave bands. Wesson also began working out of Hans Zimmers' Lillie Yard Studio where he began to explore the studio and experiment with sound and picture as well working with such artists as Siouxsie and The Banshees, producer Mike Hedges and musician Youth. He received a multi platinum award for his contributions to The Verve's Urban Hymns album and their single "Bitter Sweet Symphony". It was this album Zimmer was listening to in 2000 when he spotted Wesson's credit and invited him to work on the score for Mission: Impossible 2.

Since that time Wesson has created his own niche within the movie score genre as an ambient music designer. This area of atmospheric sound has weaved its way through many of Zimmer's' scores including Ridley Scott's Hannibal and Black Hawk Down. Christopher Nolan's Batman Begins, The Dark Knight, and most recently Inception.

Outside of his feature film work, Wesson composes scores for commercials, television and video games; some of his television scores include work for the BBC, ITV, Discovery, MTV, CNN News broadcasts, Sky.

== Ambient Music Design / Additional Music ==
=== Feature films ===
2013

- Olympus Has Fallen
- Pacific Rim
- Captain Phillips
- The Secret Life of Walter Mitty

2012

- Snow White and the Huntsman
- The Dark Knight Rises
- The Bourne Legacy

2011

- The Art of Flight
- Green Lantern

2010

- The Tourist
- Inception
- Season of the Witch

2009

- Angels & Demons

2008

- Frost/Nixon
- The Dark Knight
- The Happening

2007

- Michael Clayton
- Transformers
- Pirates of the Caribbean: At World's End
- The Lookout

2006

- Blood Diamond
- The Texas Chainsaw Massacre: The Beginning
- Lady in the Water
- Pirates of the Caribbean: Dead Man's Chest
- The Da Vince Code
- Freedomland

2005

- King Kong
- The Island
- The Ring Two
- Batman Begins
- The Interpreter

2004

- Thunderbirds
- King Arthur
- Man on Fire

2003

- The Texas Chainsaw Massacre
- The Rundown
- Matchstick Men
- Bad Boys II
- Pirates of the Caribbean: The Curse of the Black Pearl
- Phone Booth
- Tears of the Sun

2002

- Spirit: Stallion of the Cimarron
- Beat The Devil
- Phone Booth
- Spirit: Stallion of the Cimarron

2001

- Black Hawk Down
- Hannibal

2000

- Mission: Impossible 2

1992

- Dakota Road

1988

- Paperhouse

=== Video games ===
2013

- Titanfall

2009

- Infamous

2007

- Call of Duty 4: Modern Warfare

=== Other projects ===
- Inception Live Premiere Performance
- Inception: The App
- Inception: The Soundscape
- The Dark Knight: 2-CD Special Edition
- SOS Short Films: Electroland
- Shrek 4-D Universal Studios Theme Park Ride
- Various TV-series, theatrical teaser trailers, production music CD's, music albums, music videos and commercials

== Awards ==
Wesson received a multi-platinum award for his contributions to The Verve's Urban Hymns album and the anthemic single "Bitter Sweet Symphony".

== See also ==
Ambient music design
