= Francisco Lupica =

American, California-based musician

Francesco Lupica is an American, California-based musician. Frank Lupica went to play with the likes of the Sound Machine, Lee Michaels, West Coast Pop Art Experimental Band, Travel Agency, Shanti, and the Steven Seagal Band, before goes solo too. Once part of the band Shanti, he moved into a solo career, releasing one album, Francesco's Cosmic Beam Experience. Lupica is the first musician to widely make use of the Cosmic Beam Experience, first in live shows, then composing and performing Cosmic Beam Experience Music, Sound Design and Additional Music for film scores such as Terrence Malick's The Thin Red Line, The New World, Tree of Life (winner of The Palm dOR at Cannes Film Festival 2011), To the Wonder, Knight of Cups and Voyage of Time, Last Hours and Carbon, plus Martin Scorsese's Silence, Jordan Vogt-Roberts's Kong: Skull Island, and Andrew Wakefield's VAXXED from Cover Up to Catastrophe.
