= The Dark Knight (soundtrack) =

2008 soundtrack album by Hans Zimmer and James Newton Howard

The Dark Knight: Original Motion Picture Soundtrack

Soundtrack album by Hans Zimmer and James Newton Howard
- Released: July 15, 2008 (CD); August 12, 2008 (LP); December 9, 2008 (special edition)
- Recorded: April 4–30, 2008
- Studios: AIR Lyndhurst, London; Remote Control Productions, Santa Monica; James Newton Howard Studios, Santa Monica
- Genre: Film score
- Length: 73:24
- Labels: Warner Sunset; Warner Bros.
- Producers: Hans Zimmer; James Newton Howard

Alternative cover
- Collectors Edition cover

The Dark Knight: Original Motion Picture Soundtrack is the soundtrack album to the 2008 film of the same name, which is a sequel to Christopher Nolan's 2005 film Batman Begins. The soundtrack was released on July 15, 2008, in three editions: CD, limited edition CD digipak, and digital download. The 2-CD Special Edition was released on December 9, along with the DVD. A limited edition 180-gram vinyl LP was released on August 12. The soundtrack was composed and arranged by Hans Zimmer and James Newton Howard, performed by the Hollywood Studio Symphony and recorded in April.

Just like Batman Begins and later The Dark Knight Rises, the main motif always consists in just two notes, played by horns and accompanied by strings, representing Batman's pain and guilt.

In many tracks is also reprised Batman's main action theme ("Molossus"), first used in Batman Begins and later in The Dark Knight Rises.

Zimmer was responsible for creating Joker's theme, while James Newton Howard focused on Harvey Dent/Two-Face theme.

The score won the Grammy Award for Best Score Soundtrack for Visual Media, "Best Music" at the Saturn Awards and "Best Soundtrack" at the Brit Awards, while it was nominated in the category "Best Film Music" at the BAFTA Awards.

== Composition ==
Zimmer originally said the main Batman theme was purposely introduced at the end of Batman Begins, and would be fleshed out in the sequel as the character develops. Zimmer and Howard both believed that creating a heroic theme that a viewer could hum would ignore the complexity and darkness of the character. The Batman theme (audible twice early in the film, once towards the end and a final time at the beginning of the end credits) creates what Zimmer described as a "red herring", a kind of musical foreshadowing, which was played by a cello.

The nine-minute suite for the Joker ("Why So Serious") was based around two notes played by electric cello, solo violin, guitars and a string section. Zimmer compared its style to the band Kraftwerk, who come from his native Germany, as well as his work with bands like The Damned. Throughout the piece, Zimmer used razor blades on string instruments to achieve the tortured, twisted sound to accompany the character on the screen. When Ledger died, Zimmer stated that he felt like scrapping his original material and composing a new theme, but decided that to do so would compromise the "evil [performance] projects". James Newton Howard composed the "elegant and beautiful" themes for Harvey Dent/Two-Face, to work as an aural contrast. The suite contains ten thousand musical bars.

The heroic brass theme which plays when Batman leaves Ra's al Ghul to die in Batman Begins makes a reappearance when Batman hurls the Joker off the building in the film's climax. It also makes its third and final appearance in The Dark Knight Rises when Batman fires a missile at Miranda Tate, while her truck driver was killed, sending her and the truck to a crashing halt. The cue was released on the two-disc special edition, and can be found on the track, "We Are Tonight's Entertainment". The second disc can also be found for digital download under the album name The Dark Knight (Bonus Digital Release) with artwork featuring the Joker instead of Batman.

== Sales ==
The soundtrack debuted on the Billboard 200 list at No. 20, with 25,000 copies sold in the first week. During its second week in release, the track fell to No. 23, with an estimated 20,000 copies sold. It dropped out of top 100 on its third week, but held the position of No. 192 selling 2,100. On its fourth week it fell out of the Top 200.

A 2-CD Special Edition of The Dark Knight soundtrack was released on December 9, 2008. In addition to the 14 tracks on the regular release, an additional 10 tracks of score were added to the second disc, along with four remixes by The Crystal Method, Paul van Dyk, Mel Wesson, and Ryeland Allison, packaged as a digibook in a semi-artificial leather slipcase with the Bat-Signal cut out. The Digibook features several movie scenes, production details and a few words from Christopher Nolan on the collaboration with Hans Zimmer and James Newton Howard. The first disc is exactly the same as the original release, with additional tracks and remixes on the latter disc. Between the two of them, the two discs of the special edition form most of the film's score, though the tracks are arranged in an order different from the scenes in the film.

== Reception ==
Professional ratings
Review scores
Source	Rating
AllMusic	3.5/5 stars
Empire	4/5 stars
Film Music Magazine	B
Filmtracks	2/5 stars
iTunes	Favorable
SoundtrackNet	3.5/5 stars
Tracksounds	4/5 stars

The score received favorable responses. Websites like tracksounds.com and Soundtrack.net have released mostly positive reviews, commending the score's blend of electronic and orchestral elements as well as its continued departure from the tone of Tim Burton's Batman and Batman Returns set by Danny Elfman. Other sites, like Movie Music UK and especially Filmtracks.com found the score to be bland and uncreative, with many elements borrowed from the previous scores of both composers, especially previous scores by Zimmer. Filmtracks.com reviewer Christian Clemmensen found the track "Why so Serious" unlistenable and referred to it as "nine minutes of your life that you'll never get back", but praised the cue "Harvey Two-Face" which was composed by James Newton Howard. Other complaints were about Batman's new heroic theme, featured most heavily in Like a Dog Chasing Cars, which Clemmensen considered "a murky blend of The Last Samurai, The Thin Red Line, The Da Vinci Code, and Crimson Tide".

== Awards ==
The soundtrack was awarded the Grammy Award for Best Score Soundtrack for Visual Media in February 2009. Later in May, the soundtrack won a Classical BRIT Award for Best Soundtrack. It was first disqualified for consideration for that year's Oscars, as the Academy ruled there were more names listed as composers than they permit, a decision that then later was reversed. The score won several other awards, including "Best Music" at the Saturn Awards.

== Track listing ==
Disc One

#	Title	Length	Key Scenes/Notes
1	"Why So Serious?"	9:14	Suite of the Joker's various themes. This track is named after the line the Joker tells Gambol. Hans Zimmer was the composer of this piece and tried using different experiments on instruments to create a wide variety of distinctive noises for the piece. Various sections of the track are played several times across the movie.
2	"I'm Not a Hero"	6:34	Directly after the bank robbery (when Mike Engel is interviewing the Mayor), when Chechen meets Scarecrow about the drugs that Crane sold to him, when the plane lands in the water to pick up Bruce and when Batman is in Hong Kong retrieving Lau. It is edited slightly when Mr. Reese tries blackmailing Lucius Fox. This cue is named when Batman says "Because I'm not a hero. Not like Dent". It is played in sections throughout movie and was also used in the opening logos. It's the first time that the two-note motif is heard in the soundtrack.
3	"Harvey Two-Face"	6:16	Harvey Dent and Two-Face's theme. This track is named for when Gordon tells Harvey's nickname which is "Harvey-Two-Face". James Newton Howard was the composer. Part of the track is played when the police arrests Maroni and Chechen.
4	"Aggressive Expansion"	4:35	The first part is played at the end of movie: the scene when Batman escapes on his Batpod from the police. The middle is during Fox's meeting with Lau in Hong Kong. At the 2:08 mark, the track transitions into when detective Ramirez tells Gordon about the Joker Card containing three sets of DNA - targeted people by the Joker. Commissioner Loeb and Judge Surillo being 2 of 3 while dying moments later and the Joker personally comes for Harvey Dent at the party saying, "We made it!" upon arrival.. The name comes from the Joker line: "There's a lot of potential for aggressive expansion".
5	"Always a Catch"	1:39	The beginning is while the Joker wildly guns down other cars demanding Batman hit him. The second half of the track (from 0:45 to the end) is unused in the film. This line is not said in the film, but would have been placed during the scene where Gordon and Batman discuss the Joker's ferry situation. The script has Gordon yelling to Batman: "Then he'll blow them both up! There's no time- we have to go in now-" and Batman responds: "There's always a catch with him-" before getting ready to rescue the hostages from the hospital.
6	"Blood on My Hands"	2:16	During Harvey Dent and Gordon's first scene together and when Bruce asks Fox to make a new Batsuit. This one is named for when Bruce says: "Maybe, but I have enough blood on my hands".
7	"A Little Push"	2:42	While Harvey threatens a thug using his coin and a revolver. This one is named from when the Joker says his last line in the film: "Madness, as you know, is like gravity. All it needs is a little push".
8	"Like a Dog Chasing Cars"	5:02	Theme suite composed by Hans Zimmer. The first half of the track is played when Batman and Gordon discuss on the rooftop before the SWAT unit storms the building; the second half (differently edited in the movie) is played when Batman fights the SWAT unit in order to save the hostages dressed as clowns. The title comes from a Joker's line in the hospital.
9	"I Am the Batman"	1:59	While Alfred tells Bruce a story of his time in Burma. The cue is titled after the press conference scene when Harvey says that he's Batman.
10	"And I Thought My Jokes Were Bad"	2:28	When Bruce is driving around making sure Mr. Reese is not killed. The title is from when the Joker appears to the mobsters and says "And I thought my jokes were bad".
11	"Agent of Chaos"	6:55	Batman goes to rescue Rachel after the interrogation with the Joker, the Joker escapes, Rachel's death and Harvey's disfigurement, and aftermath. It is named when Joker says, "I'm an agent of chaos" during the hospital scene.
12	"Introduce a Little Anarchy"	3:42	Begins as Batman realizes that the Joker has dressed the hostages as his henchmen, "Clowns". It finishes when the Joker pushes Batman through a net. The line is said during the hospital scene.
13	"Watch the World Burn"	3:47	Plays as Harvey Dent/Two-Face holds Gordon and his family at gunpoint and concludes with Batman tackling Dent. The title is from when Alfred describes the Joker by saying, "Some men just want to watch the world burn". It was composed by James Newton Howard.
14	"A Dark Knight"	16:14	Hans Zimmer was the composer of this particular track.The first part of the track is a longer version of the melody heard in the final scene of the film (when Batman decides to take the blame to protect the city), while other parts are used in the end credits or ultimately unused in the film. The title comes from Gordon's final monologue when he describes Batman as, "a silent guardian, a watchful protector, a dark knight".

Disc Two- (Bonus Special Edition)

#	Title	Length	Key Scenes/Notes
1	"Bank Robbery (Prologue)"	5:24	During the opening scene when the Joker and his clown goons are robbing the mob bank.
2	"Buyer Beware"	2:56	When Batman breaks up the meeting between the Chechen and the Scarecrow. The title comes from a line said during the meeting by the Scarecrow in response to the Chechen yelling at him about his toxin. The track contains hints of the Scarecrow's theme from Batman Begins.
3	"Halfway to Hong Kong"	3:43	The first scene in the new "Batcave" and Sal Maroni's trial. The title comes from a line said by Harvey when Lau escapes.
4	"Decent Men in an Indecent Time"	2:51	When Gordon returns home, when Batman tortures Sal Maroni, when Dent threatens Thomas Schiff (before 'A Little Push') and the opening titles. The title comes from the scene where Two-Face, confronted by Batman, says, "You thought we could be decent men in an indecent time!"
5	"You're Gonna Love Me"	4:51	During Dent's conversation with the Mayor in his office when the hanged Batman imposter slams on the window. Also when the Joker is at the penthouse party, Batman arrives, and Rachel is thrown off of the building. Also the end is where Bruce kisses Rachel in his apartment. The title comes from a line said by Batman before he fights the Joker and his men at the fundraiser.
6	"Chance"	3:34	The aftermath of the Joker's attempt to kill the mayor, Harvey claims to be Batman, and when he gives Rachel the coin. The title comes from the scene when Two-Face is confronted by Batman and says, "And the only morality in a cruel world is chance".
7	"You Complete Me"	4:51	During the interrogation between Batman and the Joker, when the Joker kills the Chechen, when Gordon is preparing to ambush the Joker after that, when the Joker places the threat on Mr. Reese and when the Batpod bursts out of the Tumbler. The title comes from a line said by the Joker in the interrogation scene.
8	"The Ferries"	9:57	The scene with the Joker and Harvey in the hospital, the end of the death threat on Reese, the bar scene with Two-Face and Wuertz, when the Joker threatens the ferries, and when Two-Face interrogates Ramirez.
9	"We Are Tonight's Entertainment"	5:38	The climax of the ferry scene, when Batman throws the Joker out of the building and the Joker tells Batman that he had corrupted Harvey. The title comes from a line said by the Joker when he crashes the fundraiser.
10	"A Watchful Guardian"	6:45	From the part where Batman tackles Two-Face until the beginning of the credits (editor Lee Smith A.C.E.), and the very end of the credits. The title comes from combining "A watchful protector" and "silent guardian" in Gordon's monologue, mentioned in "A Dark Knight".
11	"Why So Serious?"	5:30	The Crystal Method Remix.
12	"Poor Choice of Words"	6:15	Paul van Dyk Remix. The title comes from when the Joker drops Rachel, saying, "A very poor choice of words".
13	"Gunpowder and Gasoline"	4:34	Mel Wesson Remix. The title comes from the scene where the Joker confronted the Chechen and sets the mob's money and Lau on fire, saying, "I enjoy dynamite and gunpowder and gasoline!"
14	"Rory's First Kiss"	6:04	Ryeland Allison Remix. The title comes from a fake working title for The Dark Knight.

Tracks not included within the release of the soundtrack:

#	Title	Performer(s)	Key Scenes/Notes
1	"Balmoral"	The Pipes and Drums of Chicago Police Department	Played during Commissioner Loeb's funeral.
2	"Scatterin' Monkey"	Boom Boom Satellites	Played in Maroni's night club.
3	"4 A Moment of Silence"	Boom Boom Satellites	Played outside of Maroni's night club.

== Chart positions ==
Chart (2008)	Peak position
U.S. Billboard 200	20
Top Internet Albums	23
Top Soundtracks	3
