= Paulhan =

Paulhan may refer to:

== People ==
- Frédéric Paulhan (1856–1931), French philosopher
- Jean Paulhan (1884–1968), French writer
- Louis Paulhan (1883–1963), French aviator

== Other uses ==
- Paulhan, Hérault department, Occitanie, France, a commune
- Paulhan biplane, a French experimental aircraft designed in 1910
