= Desclos =

Desclos is a surname. Notable people with the surname include:

- Anne Desclos (1907–1998), French journalist and novelist
- Laurent Desclos, American electrical engineer
