= Labia =

Parts of the vulva

Labia majora with trimmed pubic hair; labia minora and vaginal opening visible

The labia are the major externally visible structures of the vulva. In humans and other primates, there are two pairs of labia: the labia majora (outer lips) are large and thick folds of skin that cover the vulva's other parts, while the labia minora (inner lips) are the folds of skin between the outer labia that surround and protect the urethral and vaginal openings, as well as the glans clitoridis.

In other mammals, the labia majora are not present and the labia minora are instead referred to as the labia vulvae.

== Etymology ==
Labium (plural labia) is a Latin-derived term meaning "lip". Labium and its derivatives (including labial, labrum) are used to describe any lip-like structure, but in the English language, labia often specifically refers to parts of the vulva.

== Structure ==
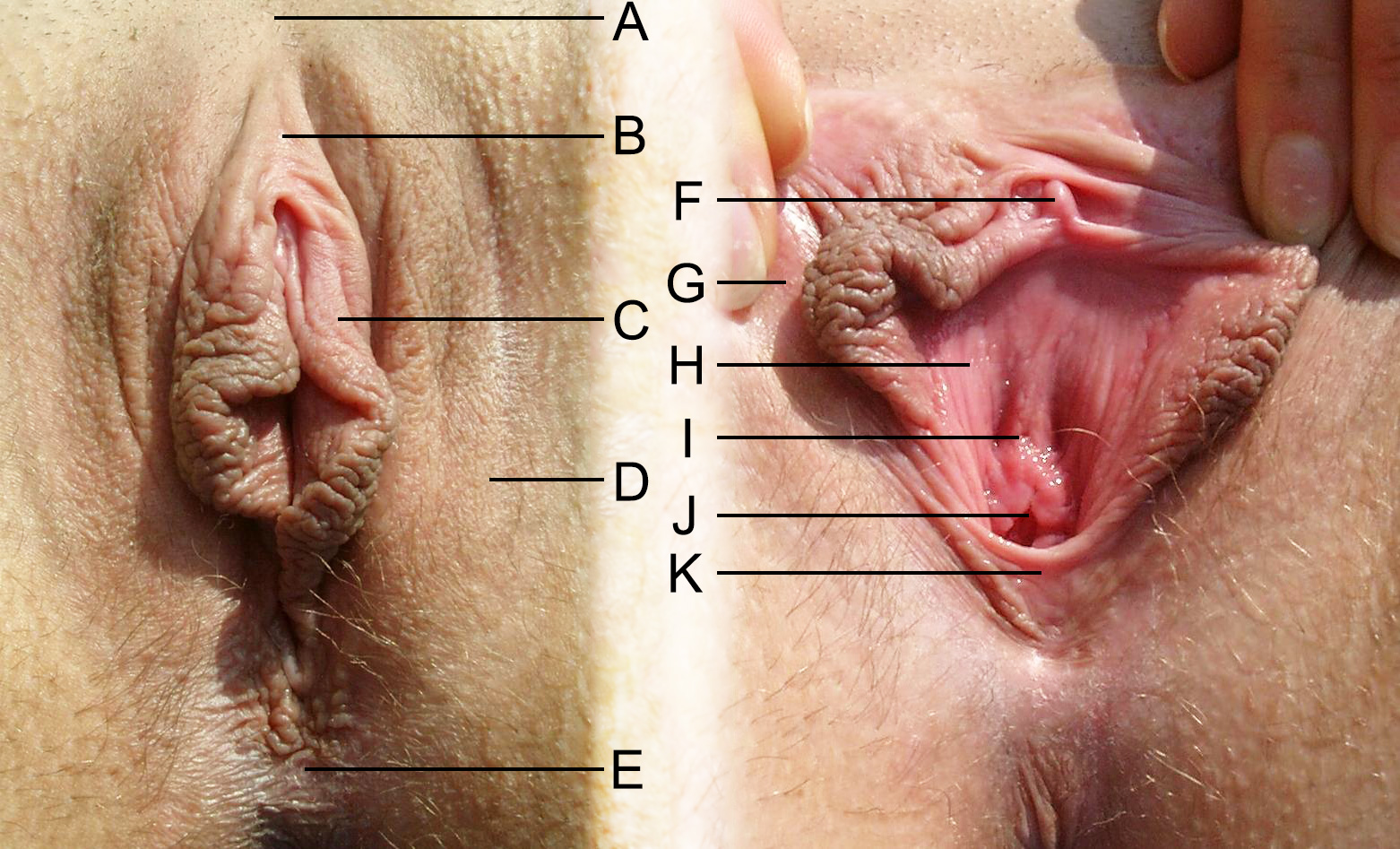
Left: In their resting state, the labia protect the inner areas of the vulva. Right: Spreading the labia apart exposes inner areas of the vulva. A) Anterior commissure of labia majora B) Clitoral hood C) Labia minora D) Labia majora E) Posterior commissure of labia majora F) Clitoral glans G) Inner surface of labia majora H) Vulvar vestibule I) External urethral orifice J) Vaginal orifice K) Fourchette

The labia majora are lip-like structures consisting mostly of skin and adipose (fatty) tissue, which extend on either side of the vulva to form the pudendal cleft through the middle. They enclose and protect the other tissues of the vulva. The labia majora often have a plump appearance, and are thicker towards the anterior. The anterior junction of the labia majora is called the anterior commissure, which is below the mons pubis and above the clitoris. To the posterior, the labia majora join at the posterior commissure, which is above the perineum and below the frenulum of the labia minora. The grooves between the labia majora and labia minora are known as the interlabial sulci or interlabial folds.

The labia minora are two soft folds of fat-free, hairless skin between the labia majora. They enclose and protect the vulvar vestibule, urethra and vagina. The upper portion of each of the labia minora splits to join both the clitoral glans, and the clitoral hood. The labia minora meet posteriorly at the frenulum of the labia minora (also known as the fourchette), which is a fold of skin below the vaginal orifice. The fourchette is more prominent in younger women, and often recedes after sexual activity and childbirth. When standing or with the legs together, the labia majora usually entirely or partially cover the moist, sensitive inner surfaces of the vulva, which indirectly protects the vagina and urethra, much like the lips protect the mouth. The outer surface of the labia majora is pigmented skin, and develops pubic hair during puberty. The inner surface of the labia majora is smooth, hairless skin, which resembles a mucous membrane, and is only visible when the labia majora and labia minora are drawn apart.

Both the inner and outer surfaces of the labia majora contain sebaceous glands (oil glands), apocrine sweat glands, and eccrine sweat glands. The labia majora have fewer superficial nerve endings than the rest of the vulva, but the skin is highly vascularized. The internal surface of the labia minora is a thin moist skin, with the appearance of a mucous membrane. They contain many sebaceous glands, and occasionally have eccrine sweat glands. The labia minora have many sensory nerve endings, and have a core of erectile tissue.

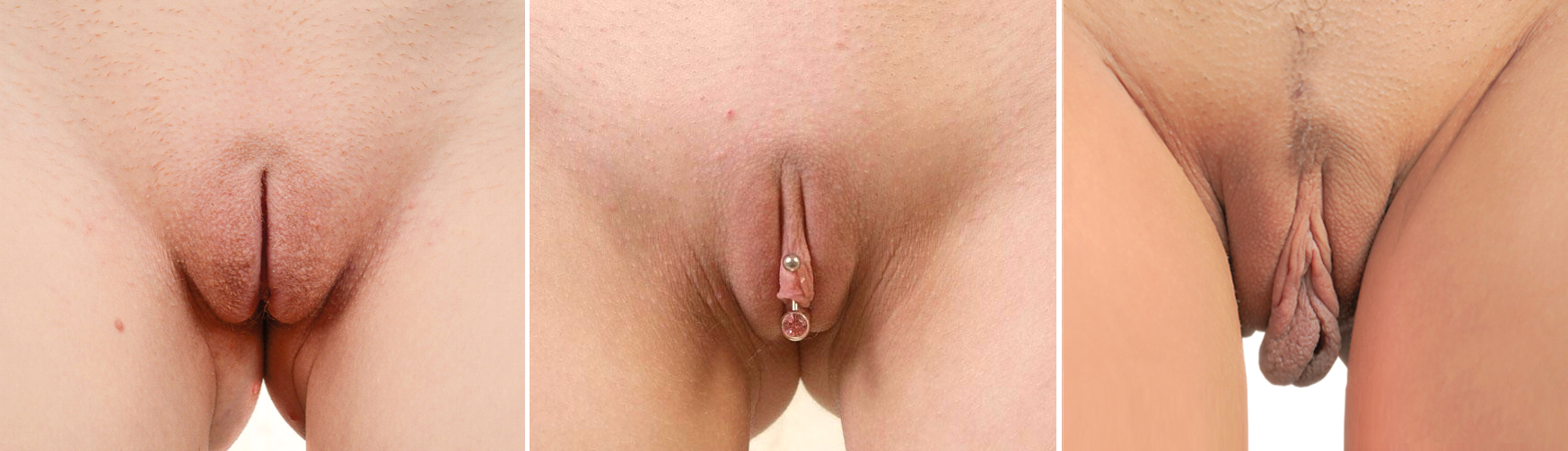
Labia minora are pronounced differently in different women. This natural variation is completely normal. Depending on the length, the labia minora are visible or completely covered in a standing posture.

=== Diversity ===
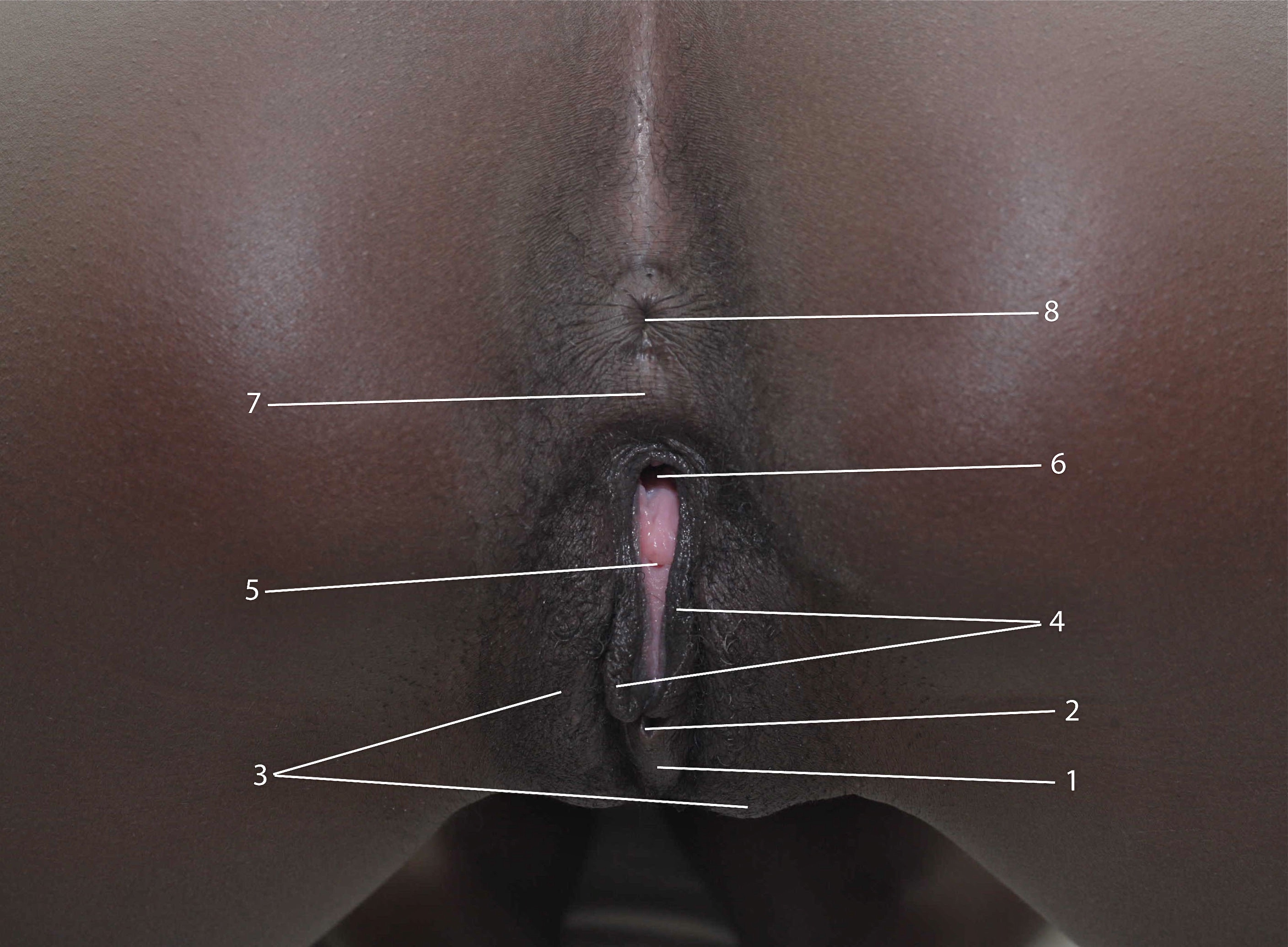
Black genitalia showing black-skinned labia, with the labia majora labeled as number 3 and labia minora labeled as number 4.

The color, size, length, and shape of the inner labia can vary extensively from woman to woman. In some women, the labia minora are almost non-existent, and in others, they can be fleshy and protuberant. They can range in color from a light pink to brownish black, and texturally can vary between smooth and very rugose.

=== Embryonic development and changes over time ===
The urogenital folds form the labia minora while the labioscrotal swellings become the labia majora.

Illustration of the Tanner scale for females, which is a scale for tracking physical changes that occur during puberty. Progression of pubic hair growth can be seen on the right.

The genital tissues are greatly influenced by natural fluctuations in hormone levels, which lead to changes in labia size, appearance, and elasticity at various life stages. At birth, the labia minora are well-developed, and the labia majora appear plump due to being exposed to maternal hormones in the womb. The labia majora have the same color as the surrounding skin. Labial adhesions can occur between the ages of 3 months and 2 years, and may make the vulva look flat. These adhesions are not usually a cause for concern, and usually disappear without treatment. Treatment options may include estrogen cream, manual separation with local anesthesia, or surgical separation under sedation.

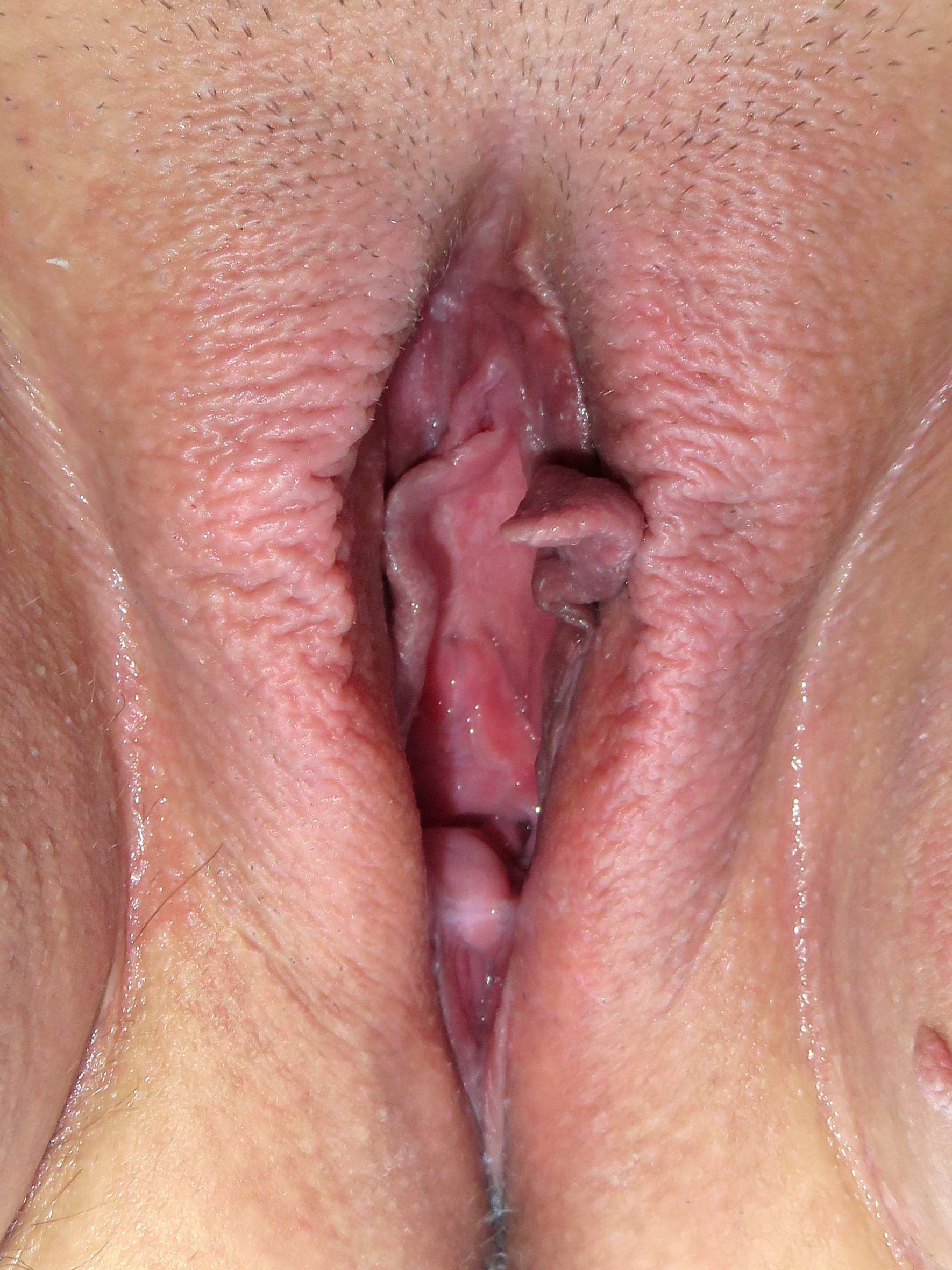
Aroused labia majora with wrinkles

During early childhood, the labia majora look flat and smooth because of decreasing levels of body fat, and the diminished effects of maternal hormones. The labia minora become less prominent.

During puberty, increased hormone levels often significantly change the appearance of the labia. The labia minora become more elastic, prominent, and wrinkled. The labia majora regain fat, and begin growing pubic hair close to the pudendal cleft. Hair is initially sparse and straight, but gradually becomes darker, denser, and curlier as growth spreads outward and upward toward the thighs and mons pubis. At the end of puberty, pubic hair will be coarse, curly, and fairly thick. The patch of pubic hair covering the genitals will eventually often form a triangle shape.

By adulthood, the outer surface of the labia majora may be darker than the surrounding skin, and may have wrinkles. During the reproductive years, if a woman delivers a child, the fourchette will flatten. Pregnancy may cause the labia minora to darken in color.

Later in life, the labia majora once again gradually lose fat, becoming flatter and more wrinkled, and pubic hair turns grey. Following menopause, falling hormone levels cause further changes to the labia. The labia minora atrophy, making them become less elastic, and pubic hair on the labia majora becomes more sparse.

== Sexual arousal and response ==
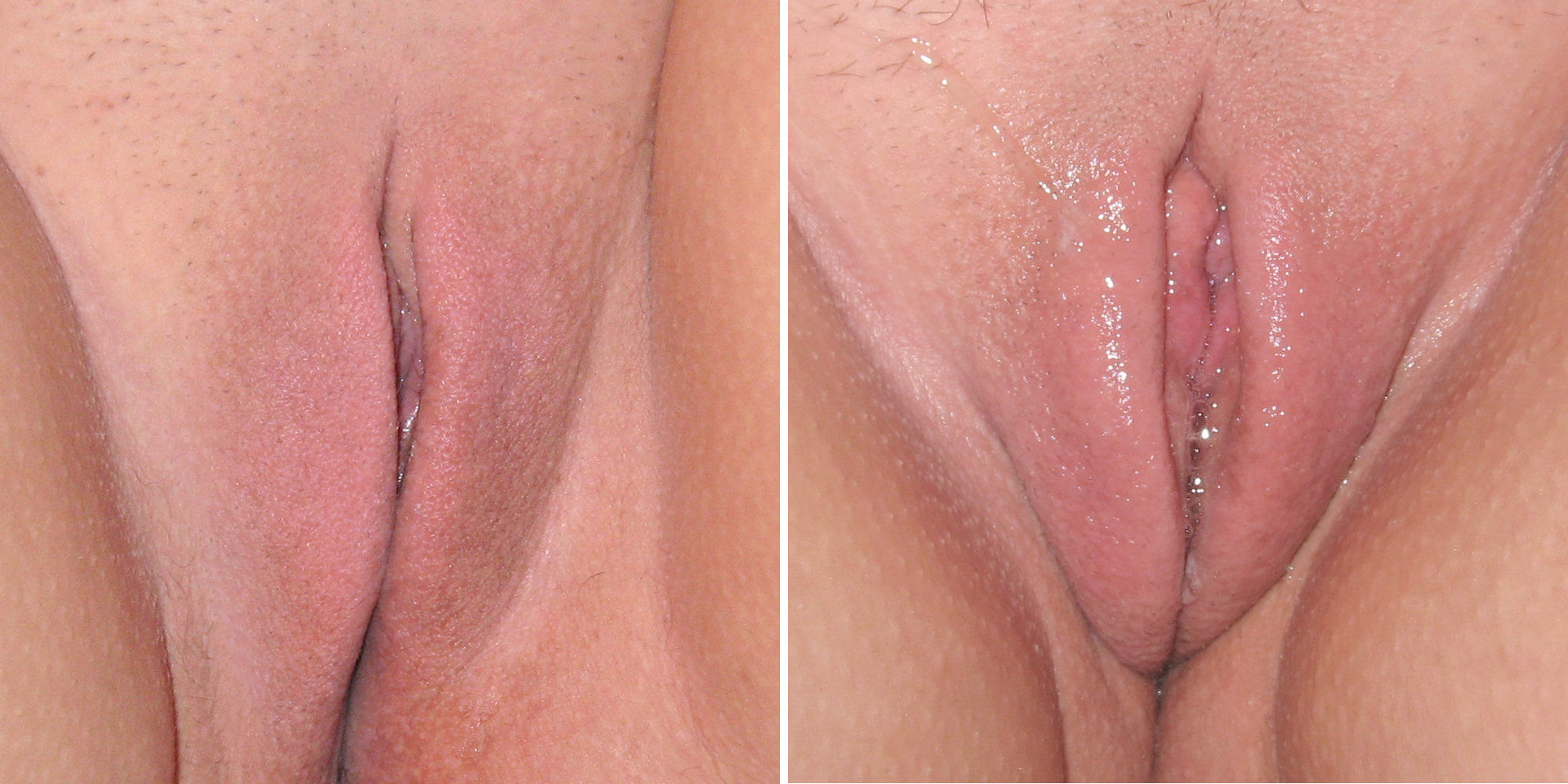
Left: A vulva in the resting, unaroused state. Right: During sexual arousal, the inner and outer labia swell, the labia majora recede slightly, and the vulva becomes lubricated.

The labia are an erogenous zone. In particular, the labia minora are sexually responsive, and sensitivity varies greatly. In some, they are so sensitive that anything other than light touch may be uncomfortable, whereas stimulation may elicit no sexual response in others. The labia may be sexually stimulated as part of masturbation or with a sex partner, such as by fingering or oral sex. Moving the labia minora can also stimulate the extremely sensitive clitoris.

During sexual arousal, the labia majora swell due to increased blood flow to the region, and slightly draw back, revealing the inner labia. The labia minora become engorged with blood, causing them to expand in diameter by two to three times, and darken or redden in color. Because pregnancy and childbirth increase genital vascularity, the inner and outer labia will engorge faster in women who have had children.

After a period of sexual stimulation, the labia minora will become further engorged with blood approximately 30 seconds to 3 minutes before orgasm, causing them to redden further. In those who have had children, the labia majora may also swell significantly during this period, becoming dark red. Continued stimulation can result in an orgasm, and the orgasmic contractions help remove blood trapped in the inner and outer labia, as well as the clitoris and other parts of the vulva, which causes pleasurable orgasmic sensations.

Following orgasm or when no longer sexually aroused, the labia gradually return to their unaroused state. The labia minora return to their original color within 2 minutes, and engorgement dissipates in about 5 to 10 minutes. The labia majora return to their pre-arousal state in approximately 1 hour.

== Society and culture ==
In many cultures and locations all over the world, the labia, as part of the genitalia, are considered private, or intimate parts, whose exposure (especially in public) is governed by fairly strict socio-cultural mores. In many cases, public exposure is limited, and often prohibited by law.

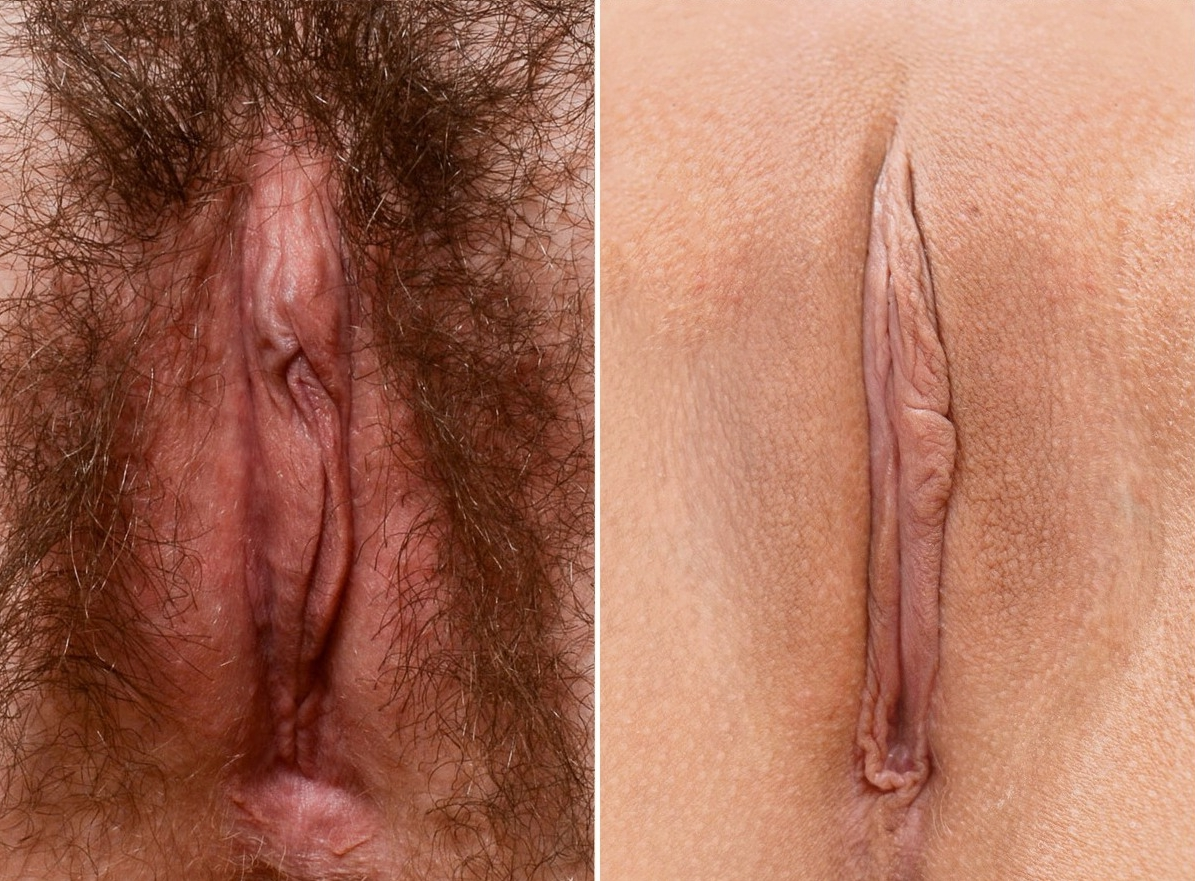
Left: Vulva with pubic hair. Right: Vulva with hair removed by waxing.

Views on pubic hair differ between people and between cultures. Some women prefer the look or feel of pubic hair, while others may choose to remove some or all of it. Temporary methods of removal include shaving, trimming, waxing, sugaring and depilatory products while permanent hair removal can be accomplished using electrolysis or laser hair removal. In Korea, pubic hair is considered a sign of fertility, leading some women to have pubic hair transplants. Some women are self-conscious about the size, color or asymmetry of their labia. Viewing pornography may influence a woman's view of her genitals. Models in pornography frequently have small or non-existent labia minora, and images are often airbrushed, so pornographic images do not depict the full range of natural variations of the vulva. This can lead viewers of pornography to have unrealistic expectations about how the labia should look. Similar to how some women develop self-esteem issues from comparing their faces and bodies to airbrushed models in magazines, women who compare their vulvas to idealized pornographic images may believe their own labia are abnormal. This can have a negative impact on a woman's life, since genital self-consciousness makes it more difficult to enjoy sexual activity, see a gynecologist, or perform a genital self-examination. Developing an awareness for how much the labia truly differ between individuals may help to overcome this self-consciousness.

In several countries in Africa and Asia, the vulva is routinely altered or removed for reasons related to ideas about tradition, purity, hygiene and aesthetics. Known as female genital mutilation (FGM), the procedures include clitoridectomy and so-called "pharaonic circumcision," whereby the inner and outer labia are removed and the vulva is sewn shut. FGM is mostly outlawed around the world, even in countries where the practice is widespread.

Labiaplasty is a controversial plastic surgery procedure that involves the creation or reshaping of the labia. Labia piercing is a cosmetic piercing, usually with a special needle under sterile conditions, of the inner or outer labia. Jewelry is worn in the resulting opening. Reconstructive surgery is a type of surgery on the labia to repair or reconstruct vulvar tissue after an injury, medical condition, or a surgery.

== See also ==
- Femalia
- Labia stretching
- Vulva activism
