= Posterior labial =

Posterior labial may refer to:

- Posterior labial arteries
- Posterior labial nerves
- Posterior labial veins
