= Éric Rochat =

French producer, screenwriter and director

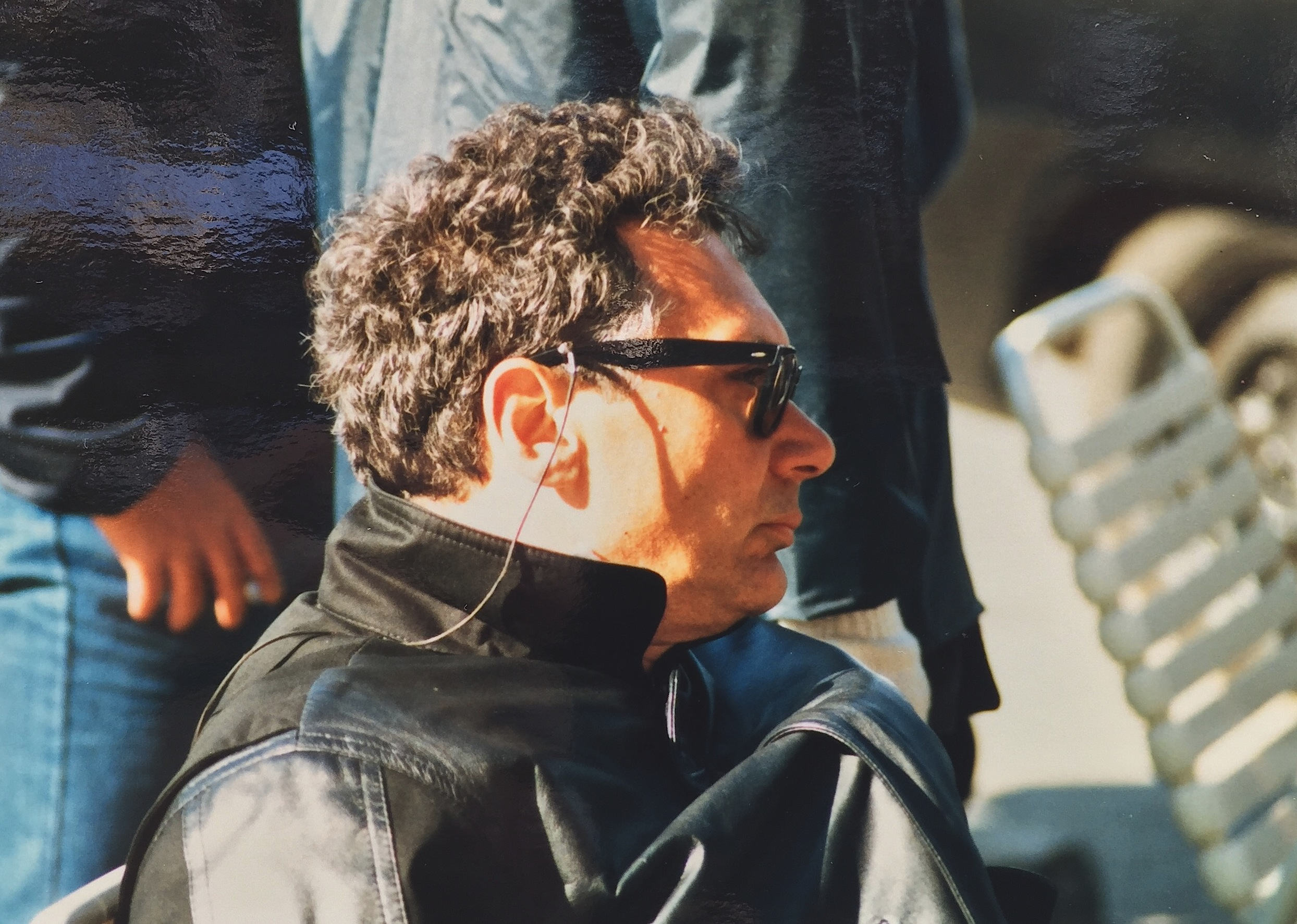
- Born: 18 October 1936; Paris
- Died: 5 August 2003; Rio de Janeiro
- Citizenship: French
- Occupation(s): Film producer, director, screenwriter

Éric Rochat (October 18, 1936 in Paris – October 5, 2003 in Rio de Janeiro) was a French film producer, director and scriptwriter. He is mostly known for his success in producing erotic films.

== Biography ==
He started his cinematographic career as a producer with François Reichenbach portraying musicians such as Arthur Rubinstein in 1969, and Yehudi Menuhin in 1971.

In 1972, Rochat partnered with Claude Giroux to produce his first feature film, The Killer, starring Jean Gabin as the chief of police Le Guen. The movie casting also gave Gerard Depardieu his first movie role. In 1973 they produced The Dominici Affair starring Jean Gabin as Gaston Dominici.

In 1975, after buying the rights of Story of O, a book written by Pauline Reage, from his partner Claude Giroux, Rochat produced the erotic cult film Story of O, directed by Just Jaeckin and starring Corinne Clery.

In 1976, Rochat produced Sex O'Clock USA, a French non-fiction feature documentary directed by François Reichenbach. The feature film reviews the hidden sexuality of a highly puritanical US society.

Then in 1980, Rochat produced Tusk, directed by surrealist Alejandro Jodorowsky, and based on the novel Poo Lorn of the Elephants, by Reginald Campbell.

In 1981, the story of the icon of the times, Coco Chanel, was brought to the screen in Chanel Solitaire, directed by George Kaczender, starring Marie-France Pisier, Lambert Wilson and Timothy Dalton.

In 1984, Rochat wrote, produced, and directed the Story of O sequel, Story of O - Chapter 2, starring Sandra Wey.

In 1987, Rochat wrote and directed in Japan the feature film Too Much, produced by Menahem Golan and Yoram Globus. This futuristic feature film for kids uses Japanese technology to tell a story between a little girl and a robot.

In 1990, Rochat produced The 5th Monkey. This feature film, starring Ben Kingsley, is an adaptation from the eponymous novel by Jacques Zibi, who co-wrote the script with Rochat.

In 1992, the ten-hour series Story of O - The Series was written, produced and directed by Rochat. Its DVD box received great commercial success.

In 2002, Rochat wrote, produced and co-directed Living O with his spouse Chrystianne Rochat. This TV feature film tells the story of a movie producer who desires to live the experiences of O's Sir Stephen. The film was shot in Rio de Janeiro.

== Filmography ==
=== As a producer ===
- 1972: The Killer
- 1973: The Dominici Affair
- 1975: Story of O
- 1976: Sex O'Clock USA
- 1980: Tusk
- 1983: Chanel Solitaire
- 1984: Story of O - Chapter 2
- 1987: Too Much
- 1990: The 5th Monkey
- 2002: Living O

=== As a director ===
- 1984: Story of O - Chapter 2
- 1987: Too Much
- 1990: The 5th Monkey
- 1992: Story of O - The Séries
- 2002: Living O

=== As a scriptwriter ===
- 1984: Story of O - Chapter 2
- 1987: Too Much
- 1990: The 5th Monkey
- 1992: Story of O - The Séries
- 2002: Living O
