= Story of O (film) =

1975 film by Just Jaeckin

- Theatrical release poster
- French: Histoire d'O
- Directed by: Just Jaeckin
- Screenplay by: Sébastien Japrisot
- Based on: Story of O by Pauline Réage
- Produced by: Gérard Lorin; Eric Rochat
- Starring: Corinne Cléry; Udo Kier; Anthony Steel; Jean Gaven; Christiane Minazzoli; Martine Kelly; Jean-Pierre Andréani; Gabriel Cattand; Li Sellgren; Albane Navizet; Henri Piégay; Alain Noury
- Cinematography: Robert Fraisse; Yves Rolladec
- Edited by: Francine Pierre
- Music by: Pierre Bachelet
- Production companies: S.N. Prodis; Yang Films; A.D. Creation; Terra-Filmkunst GmbH
- Distributed by: S.N. Prodis (France); Constantin Film (West Germany)
- Release dates: 28 August 1975 (France); 27 November 1975 (West Germany)
- Running time: 97 minutes; 104 minutes (extended cut)
- Countries: France; West Germany
- Languages: French; English; Polish

Story of O (French: Histoire d'O, IPA: [istwaʁ do]) is a 1975 erotic drama film directed by Just Jaeckin from a screenplay by Sébastien Japrisot, based on the 1954 novel of the same name by Pauline Réage. It stars Corinne Cléry and Udo Kier.

A sequel titled Story of O: Chapter 2 was released in 1984.

== Plot ==
A young woman fashion photographer, known only as O, is taken by her lover René to Château Roissy, where she is subject to various sexual and sadomasochistic acts as part of her training to serve the members of the club.

O meets a vain model named Jacqueline, whom she photographs and grows enamored with. René introduces O to his much older step-brother, Sir Stephen, and the two men share O, as René wishes O to learn to obey and serve someone whom she does not love. While Sir Stephen proves to be a more severe and strict master than René, O soon believes he is in love with her.

At Sir Stephen's direction, O is sent to an all-female country house in Samois, run by a woman named Anne-Marie, where she undergoes further beatings and training in submission. O's visit concludes with having rings pierced into her labia at the request of Sir Stephen, and receiving a brand with his initials.

Sir Stephen tells O that René is in love with Jacqueline, and that O must seduce her and get her to undergo training at Roissy. While at first resistant to getting Jacqueline to go to Roissy, O eventually agrees. Jacqueline moves into O's flat, and is seduced by her. O reveals her BDSM lifestyle and describes her stay at Roissy to Jacqueline, who is initially repulsed and disbelieving.

Sir Stephen shares O with two other men of his acquaintance, one simply known as "the commander" and the other a young man named Ivan. After one sexual encounter with O, Ivan believes himself to be in love with her and requests that Sir Stephen release her. However, O refuses to leave Sir Stephen.

O takes Jacqueline to Roissy where she will be trained to serve René. Later Sir Stephen and O visit the commander's home in Brittany for a party, where O is treated as a visual spectacle, wearing nothing but chains and an owl mask. Watching O at the party, Sir Stephen feels that his ownership of her is complete.

Some time after that, O asks Sir Stephen if he would endure the same punishments and experiences that she has undergone to show her unconditional love for him. When he says "I suppose so", she suddenly burns his hand with a hot cigarette holder, leaving there a circle, or an O.

== Cast ==
- Corinne Cléry as O
- Udo Kier as René
- Anthony Steel as Sir Stephen
- Jean Gaven as Pierre
- Li Sellgren as Jacqueline
- Albane Navizet as Andree
- Christiane Minazzoli as Anne-Marie
- Alain Noury as Ivan
- Martine Kelly as Therese
- Jean-Pierre Andréani as Eric, maître
- Gabriel Cattand as The commander
- Henri Piégay as Maître
- Florence Cayrol as Yvonne

== Production ==
Story of O was the first in a series of sex-oriented films for Anthony Steel, although he was always clothed.

== Reception ==
The film was refused a UK theatrical release certificate from the BBFC in 1975, but was eventually passed without cuts for DVD in 2000. In 2002 the film was given an NC-17 for "sexual content".

On Rotten Tomatoes, the film holds an approval rating of 40% based on ten reviews, with an average rating of 4.9 out of 10.
