= Oring =

Oring may refer to:

- O-ring, a gasket or seal with an O-shaped cross-section
- O-ring chain, a specialized type of roller chain
- Oring language, in Nigeria
- Orienteering
  - Fox Oring
- OR-ing as an operation of logical disjunction, in logic, electronics, or computer science
- Ring of O, the BDSM jewelry
- O-Ring theory of economic development
- O-Ring failure as a cause of the Space Shuttle Challenger disaster
- O ring (smoke), trick while exhaling smoke
