= Labia piercing =

Female genital piercing

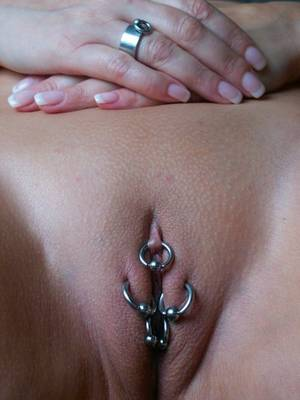
- Labia majora, labia minora and clitoral hood piercings with captive bead rings

Labia piercings are a type of female genital piercing. This piercing can be placed either through the labia minora (inner labia) or the labia majora (outer labia). They are one of the simpler and more common genital piercings performed on vulvas, and are often arranged in symmetrical single or multiple pairs. Like all genital piercings, depending on jewelry and placement, they may provide additional stimulation to one or both partners during sexual intercourse.

This piercing appears in the 1954 French erotic novel, Story of O by Anne Desclos.

== History and culture ==
There is little direct evidence of pre-contemporary practice of labia piercings, outside of anecdotal reports of the use of these piercings as chastity devices. Like many genital piercings, the contemporary origin of labia piercing resides in the BDSM culture that gave rise to the resurgence of body piercing in contemporary society. In contemporary practice, these piercings often simply fill a decorative role, rather than a purely sexual one.

This piercing appears in the 1954 French erotic novel, Story of O by Anne Desclos. The heroine, O, has a hole pierced through a labium, through which a stainless-steel ring is inserted. Another ring is linked to it, and to that, a metal disk with identifying information on it, including the name of her Master, Sir Stephen.

Labia piercings are one of the most popular vulva piercings, along with clitoral hood piercings. The prevalence of vulva piercings is estimated at 0.2% of the female population, and they are more common in younger age groups. The reasons for having labia piercings are often reported as erotic agency and sexual self-expression. Some people have labia piercings as a ritual to reclaim their bodies after sexual trauma.

== Comparison of different types ==
The labia minora run from the clitoral hood to the fourchette, and the tissue of the labia minora is similar to that of the clitoral hood. Clitoral hood piercings can allow jewellery to continually stimulate the clitoris and labia minora piercings can similarly stimulate the clitoris if they are placed high enough on the vulva. Some vulvas allow labia majora piercings to stimulate the clitoris if they can be positioned either side of it. The fourchette piercing passes through the frenulum of labia minora. Both labia major and minora piercing are done primarily for visual enhancement, and they are more visible if they are placed further forward.

Labia minora piercing is usually less painful than labia majora piercing because the skin tissue of the labia minora has relatively high elasticity making it easier to stretch and because there is less tissue to pierce through. The stretching of labia minora piercings occurs on its own in most cases, but this is much less likely to happen with labia majora piercings.

Tenderness, swelling or bleeding can occur after the procedure. The healing process lasts between four and ten weeks, and requires significant attention to hygiene. Labia majora piercings tend to heal more slowly than labia minora piercings as they pass through denser tissue. Possible complications include cellulitis and trauma during sexual activity.

== Jewellery ==
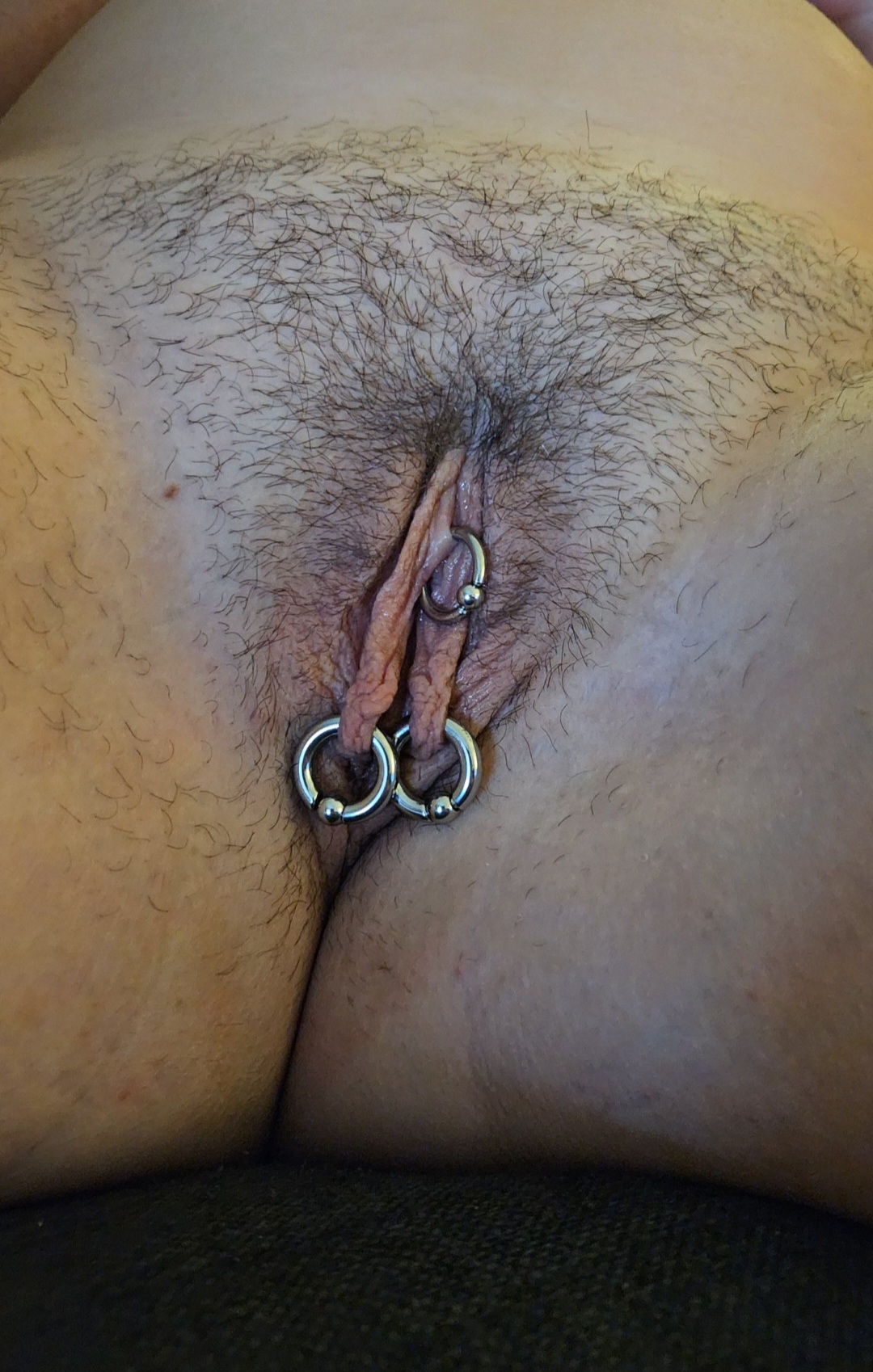
Two labia minora and one vertical clitoral hood piercing

The most common type of jewellery used in labia piercings is rings, though curved barbells are not uncommon. Weights, bells or charms are sometimes added. After enough time has passed – often around a year – labia piercings can be stretched to accommodate larger jewellery. The wearing of heavy jewellery in these piercings may be a form of ongoing or temporary sexual stimulation. Both types can also be stretched to accommodate flesh tunnel or flesh plug style jewellery.

Jewellery worn in labia piercings may have a fetish purpose. Rings or other specialised jewellery may be worn to block access to the vagina, as a form of short-term or long-term chastity piercing. Other chastity devices might also be worn that make use of the piercing, sometimes incorporating locks.

If heavy metal jewellery is worn inserted through pierced labia, the weight can result in labial asymmetry or labial hypertrophy.

== See also ==
- Body piercing
- Labia stretching
