= Story of O: Chapter 2 =

1984 film by Eric Rochat

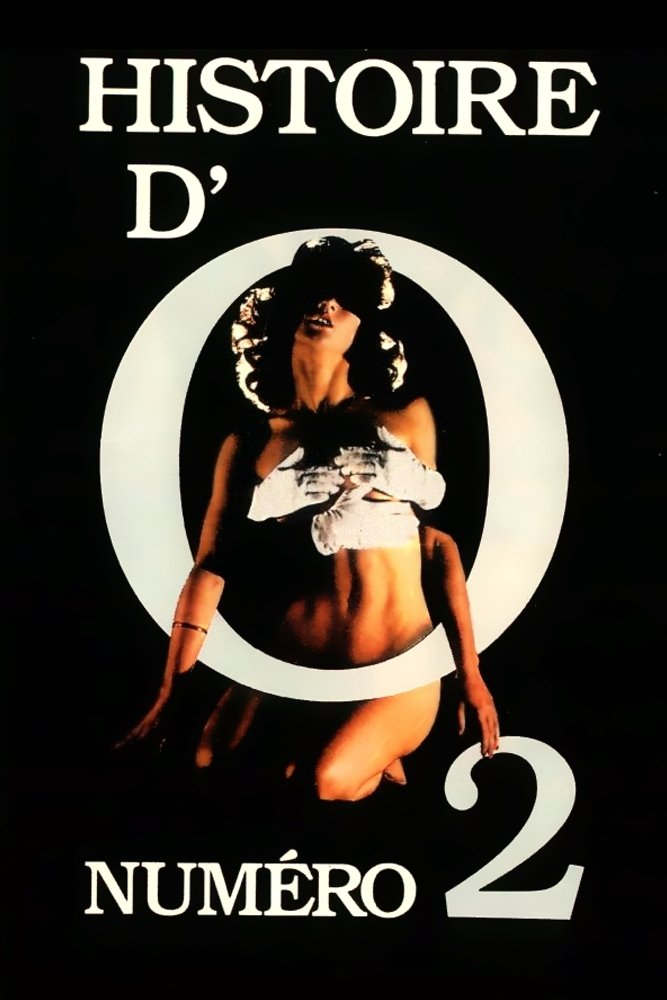
- French-language poster
- French: Histoire d'O: Chapitre 2
- Directed by: Eric Rochat
- Screenplay by: Eric Rochat; Jeffrey O'Kelly
- Based on: Story of O by Pauline Réage
- Produced by: Eric Rochat
- Starring: Sandra Wey; Manuel de Bias; Rosa Valenty; Carole James; Christian Cid; Frank Braña; Elmer Modling
- Cinematography: Andrés Berenguer
- Edited by: Alfonso Santacana
- Music by: Stanley Myers; Hans Zimmer
- Production companies: Bedrock Holding; Image Communication
- Distributed by: AMLF
- Release dates: 8 August 1984 (France); 31 August 1985 (Spain)
- Running time: 95 minutes (France); 107 minutes (Australia)
- Countries: France; Spain; Panama
- Languages: French; English; Spanish

Story of O: Chapter 2 (French: Histoire d'O: Chapitre 2) is a 1984 erotic drama film co-written, produced and directed by Eric Rochat. The script is a continuation of the film Story of O (1975), an adaptation of the 1954 novel of the same name by Pauline Réage.

== Synopsis ==
O, initiated by Sir Stephen to all subtleties of eroticism, takes control of her powers. A powerful industry group engages O to discredit the leader of an American competitor's financial empire, James Pembroke. Upon Pembroke's arrival in a splendid castle in France, O has the role of compromising his entire family: father, wife, son and daughter will succumb to the perverse and seductive talents of O who will meet only little resistance.

== Cast ==
- Sandra Wey as "O"
- Manuel de Blas as James Pembroke
- Rosa Valenty as Rosa Pembroke
- Carole James as Carol Pembroke
- Christian Cid as Larry Pembroke
- Frank Braña
- Elmer Modling
- Eduardo Bea
- Alicia Principe
- Tomás Picó
- Rubén Bianco
- Frank Sussman
- Walter Finley
- Emilio Linder
- Luis Suárez
- Irene Teppa
- Catherine Basseti
- Agustín Bravo
- Malgozarta Dobosz
- Pepita Full James
- Mariano Vidal Molina

== Sources ==
- The film was adapted in comics book Histoire d'O N°2, scenario d'Eric Rochat, drawing by Guido Crepax.
- Film music Histoire d'O N°2 in composer biography Hans Zimmer
- The Encyclopedia of Film Composers. By Thomas S. Hischak. Credits: all films USA *for best song
- Livres Hebdo, Issues 336–339. Editions professionnelles du livre, 1999 – France. Avant Critiques. Page 16 Histoire d'O et sa suite Retour à Roissy
- Le Nouvel Observateur (1986), Issues 1120–1138; Volume 1120. Page 211
- La Revue du cinéma (1984), Issues 396–400. Ligue française de l'enseignement et de l'éducation permanente – Motion pictures – Page 18, 20
- The Pleasures of the Text: Violette Leduc and Reader Seduction. By Elizabeth Locey. Notes page 167. ref 19 cf "as treated in chapter 2"
- Telepro Bruxelles – Rubrique Cinéma. Histoire d'O N°2
- Première Magazine cinéma / films / film érotique / Histoire D'O Chapitre 2
- Ecran Large – films érotique photo et critiques Histoire d'O numéro 2
- Sens Critique – films drame – Histoire d'O Chapitre 2
- Ciné cinéfil – films info – Histoire d'O Chapitre II
- Rotten Tomatoes – Histoire d'O Chapitre 2
- Challenges – Tout le ciné – Histoire d'O Numéro 2
- Public Ados – Ciné films – Histoire d'O Numéro 2
