= Dominici affair =

1952 French murder case

Coordinates: 43°58′35″N 5°54′33″E

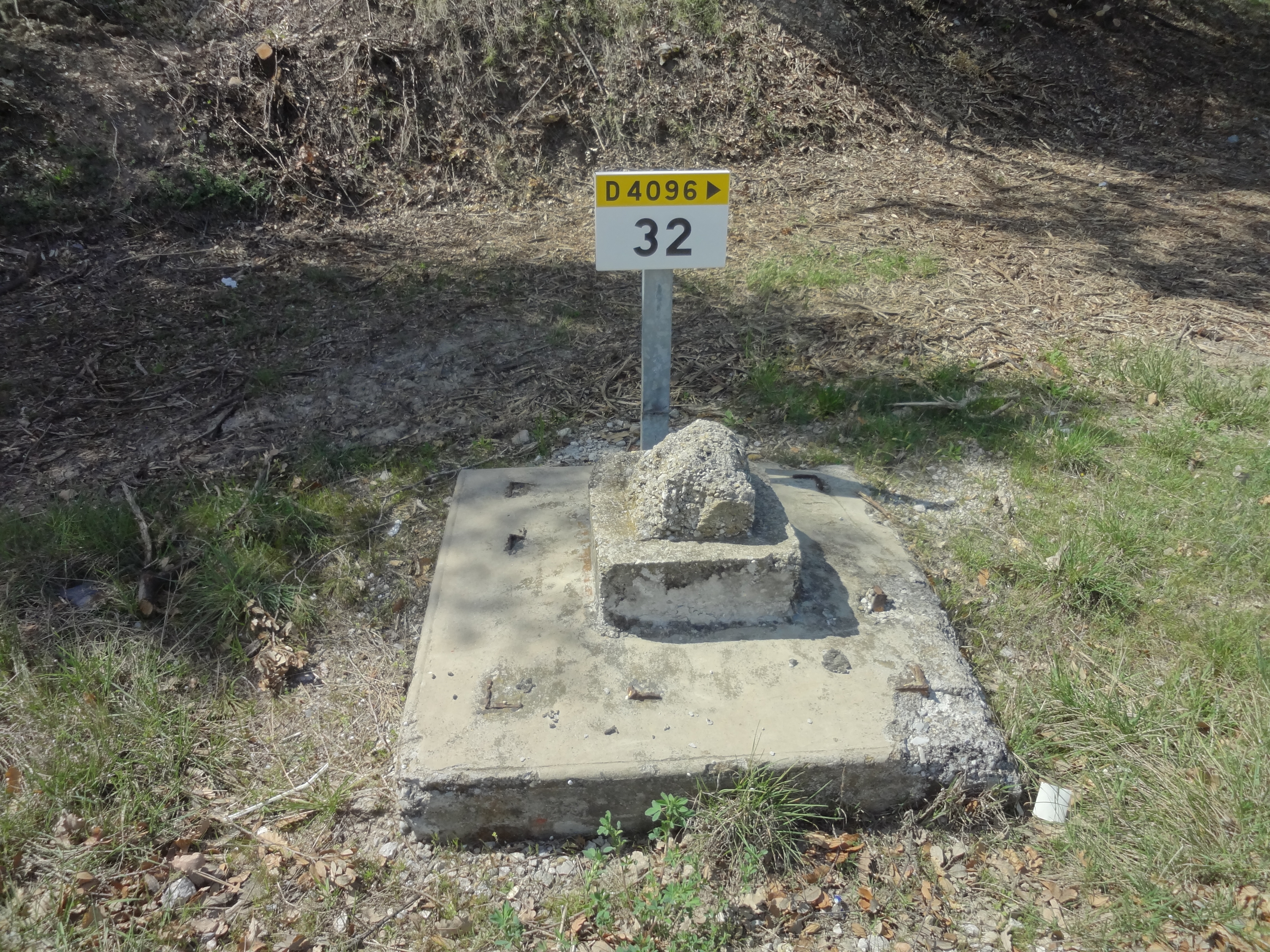
Kilometre post where the crime occurred

The Dominici affair was the criminal investigation into the murder of three Britons in France. During the night of 4/5 August 1952, Sir Jack Drummond, a 61-year-old scientist; his 44-year-old wife Anne (née Wilbraham); and their 10-year-old daughter Elizabeth were murdered next to their car, a green Hillman, with registration NNK 686 which was parked in a lay-by near La Grand'Terre, the farm belonging to the Dominici family, located near the village of Lurs in the département of Basses-Alpes (now Alpes-de-Haute-Provence). Gaston Dominici was convicted of the three murders in 1957 and sentenced to death. In 1957, with lingering questions about Dominici's guilt, President René Coty commuted the sentence to life imprisonment, and on 14 July 1960, President Charles de Gaulle ordered Dominici's release on humanitarian grounds due to his poor health. Dominici was never pardoned or given a re-trial and died on 4 April 1965.

The case was discussed by the literary theorist Roland Barthes in his book Mythologies. Barthes argues that Dominici was denied a fair trial because the Provençal dialect in which he spoke was incomprehensible to the judges, resulting in a verdict based on preconceptions and speculation; such an unfair judgment, in which the accused is condemned due to the incompatibility of their own language with that of their accuser, is identified by Barthes as an omnipresent risk.

The trial was the basis of the 1973 film The Dominici Affair directed by Claude Bernard-Aubert and starring Jean Gabin and Gérard Depardieu.
