= Prisoner of Rio =

1988 film directed by Lech Majewski

- DVD cover
- Directed by: Lech Majewski
- Written by: Lech Majewski; Ronald Biggs; Julia Frankel
- Produced by: Juliusz Kossakowski; Mark Slater
- Starring: Steven Berkoff; Paul Freeman; Peter Firth
- Cinematography: George Mooradian
- Edited by: Darren Kloomok
- Music by: Luiz Bonfá
- Distributed by: Palace Pictures (UK)
- Release date: 1988
- Running time: 104 minutes
- Countries: United Kingdom; Poland; Switzerland; Brazil
- Language: English

Prisoner of Rio is a 1988 drama film directed by Lech Majewski and starring Steven Berkoff, Paul Freeman and Peter Firth. It shows the flight of the Great Train Robber Ronnie Biggs to Brazil and the attempts of Scotland Yard detectives to re-capture him. It was a co-production between several countries.

== Plot ==
After escaping from Wandsworth prison for his part in the Great Train Robbery, Ronald "Ronnie" Biggs (Paul Freeman) goes on the run to Rio de Janeiro and becomes the world's most wanted man. Hot on his trail however is committed copper Jack McFarland (Steven Berkoff), who will stop at nothing to bring him back to justice – even if that means stepping outside the law.

== Cast ==
- Steven Berkoff ... Jack McFarland
- Paul Freeman ... Ronald Biggs
- Peter Firth ... Clive Ingram
- Florinda Bolkan ... Stella
- Desmond Llewelyn ... Commissioner Ingram
- José Wilker ... Salo
- Zezé Motta ... Rita
- Breno Moroni ... Gil
- Ronald Biggs ... Mickey
- Dennis Bourke ... Reporter at Phonebooth
- Wilza Carla ... Woman in red
- Claudia Cepeda ... Girl in Car
- Amauri Guarilha ... Policeman in Slum
- Chris Hieatt ... John
- Elke Maravilha ... Frank
- Roy Pepperell ... British Consular

== Release ==
The film was released in the United Kingdom by Palace Pictures and later on VHS by Palace Video. It was later released on DVD in the UK by Anchor Bay Entertainment.

It was released on VHS in the United States by Imperial Entertainment.

== Production ==
The real-life Ronald Biggs, the focus of the film, co-wrote the screenplay.

Steven Berkoff wrote a book about his experiences on this film, called "A Prisoner in Rio". He hated making this film and on many occasions he had to stop himself from walking away from production.
