= Cláudia Cepeda =

Brazilian actress

Cláudia Cepeda (born 1967) is an erotic (as distinct from pornographic) Brazilian actress, mostly known for playing the role of "O" in the 1992 Brazilian erotic series História de O.

== Filmography ==
- 1994 Você Decide (TV series) – Sombras do Passado
- 1992 História de O Story of O, the Series (TV series) as title character
- 1991 Manobra Radical
- 1990 Gente Fina (TV series) – Episode #1.1 - Gilda
- 1989 Pacto de Sangue (TV series) – Episode dated 8 May 1989 (1989) - Angélica
- 1988 Prisoner of Rio - Girl in Car
