= The Dominici Affair (film) =

1973 film

- Directed by: Claude Bernard-Aubert
- Written by: Daniel Boulanger; Louis-Emile Galey; Claude Bernard-Aubert
- Produced by: Sergio Bonotti; Eric Geiger; Claude Giroux; Éric Rochat; Jean Gabin
- Starring: Jean Gabin; Victor Lanoux; Gérard Depardieu
- Cinematography: Ricardo Aronovich
- Edited by: Louisette Hautecoeur
- Music by: Alain Goraguer
- Production companies: Bocaccio Films; COFCI; Mondial Televisione Film; Société Nouvelle de Cinématographie
- Distributed by: Société Nouvelle de Cinématographie
- Release date: 7 March 1973
- Running time: 105 minutes
- Countries: France; Italy
- Language: French

The Dominici Affair (French: L'affaire Dominici, Italian: L'affare Dominici) is a 1973 French-Italian crime drama film directed by Claude Bernard-Aubert and starring Jean Gabin, Victor Lanoux and Gérard Depardieu. It is based on the Dominici affair of 1952.

Location shooting took place in Ribiers (Hautes-Alpes) and Peipin (Alpes-de-Haute-Provence) where the real events occurred.

== Synopsis ==
After a British family are found murdered on the road near his family's farm in rural Provence, the old villager Gaston Dominici is arrested and apparently confesses to the crime. He is tried and sentenced to death, but his punishment is commuted on health grounds amid growing doubts about his guilt.

== Cast ==
- Jean Gabin as Gaston Dominici
- Victor Lanoux as Gustave Dominici
- Gérard Depardieu as Zeze Perrin
- Gérard Darrieu as Clovis Dominici
- Paul Crauchet as Le commissaire Sébeil
- Geneviève Fontanel as Yvette Dominici
- Evi Maltagliati as Marie Dominici
- Jacques Rispal as Paul Maillet
- Daniel Ivernel as Le président de la cour d'Assises
- Jacques Richard as L'adjoint du commissaire
- Michel Bertay as Périez, le juge d'instruction
- Jeanne Allard as Augusta Callat
- Max Amyl as L'avocat Emile Pollack
- Jean-Pierre Castaldi as Le premier journaliste
- Colin Drake as Sir Jack Drummond
- Henri Vilbert as Le président de la correctionnelle
- Alberto Farnese as Un journaliste italien
- Pierre Forget as Le père d'Yvette
- Annick Fougery as Germaine Perrin
- Nicole Giroux as Elizabeth Drummond
- Rafael Hernández as Lopez
- Jane Martel as Lady Drummond
- Jean-Claude Massoulier as Le second journaliste
- Jean-Paul Moulinot as Le médecin légiste
- Michel Robin as Perrin
- Jack Berard as Le captaine de gendarmerie
- Fernand Berset as L'homme qui félicite le commissaire
- Marie-Pierre Casey as La femme qui félicite le commissaire
- Raoul Curet as Le maire
- Hubert de Lapparent as A former Resistance fighter
- Jacques Debary as Le commissaire divisionnaire
- Christiane Delorme as L'avocate
- Gabrielle Doulcet as La vieille dame
- Marcel Gassouk as Un membre de la famille Dominici
- Jean-Yves Gautier as Le planton
- Marco Perrin as Le cuisinie

== Bibliography ==
- Harriss, Joseph. Jean Gabin: The Actor Who Was France. McFarland, 2018.
- Kitchen, Martin. The Dominici Affair: Murder and Mystery in Provence. University of Nebraska Press, 2017.
