= Patrouille de choc =

- Film poster
- Directed by: Claude Ogrel as Claude Bernard-Aubert
- Written by: Claude Bernard-Aubert
- Starring: Alain Bouvette; Jean-Claude Michel; Jean Pontoizeau
- Cinematography: Walter Wottitz
- Edited by: Gabriel Rongier
- Music by: Daniel White
- Distributed by: Films Ajax; Les Films Fernand Rivers
- Release date: 11 July 1957
- Running time: 90 minutes
- Country: France
- Languages: French; Vietnamese

Shock Patrol (French: Patrouille de choc, Vietnamese: Hai cô gái Việt) is a 1957 French war film set during the First Indochina War that was written and directed by Claude Ogrel under the name Claude Bernard-Aubert Ogrel was a war correspondent in French Indochina from 1949 to 1954 and this was his film debut. The film was the first French film about the First Indochina War. The original title Patrol Without Hope (Patrouille sans espoir) was changed along with the original pessimistic ending.

== Plot ==
During the Indochina War in the late 1940s, Lieutenant Perrin is in charge of a small battalion of French troops at a remote outpost in Vietnam.

The soldiers are on the best of terms with the locals and provide them with both education and essential medical supplies. In return, the grateful villagers keep an eye out for any sign of a possible attack by the Viet Minh. For a while, the region enjoys an almost unreal tranquillity. The soldiers are glad of the peace but boredom soon sets in amid expectations of an impending assault. When the peace ends, it ends with a brutal suddenness.

One night, the Vietnamese insurrectionists converge on the garrison and launch a fierce, all-out attack. Such are the scale and ferocity of the onslaught that Perrin and his men are caught completely off-guard and can only put up a token resistance. The French soldiers are vastly out-numbered by their Viet Minh attackers, and the grim outcome is all too certain.

== Starring ==
- Alain Bouvette ... French soldier
- Jean-Claude Michel ... French soldier
- Jean Pontoizeau ... French soldier
- Hoàng Vĩnh Lộc ... Vietnamese soldier
