= Ring of O =

Ring design with BDSM meaning

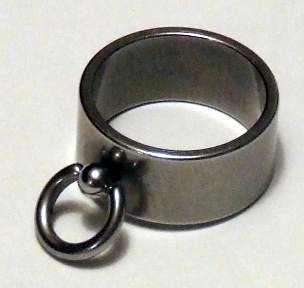
The Ring of O in its current most common shape.

The Ring of O is a specially designed ring which has been worn as a distinctive mark among BDSM practitioners, mainly in continental Europe — and especially the German-speaking countries — since the 1990s. Its use is relatively widespread within this subculture. Its name derives from the name of the central character in the classic BDSM novel Story of O (written by Anne Desclos using the name Pauline Réage), who wore an analogous ring.

The first image of this jewellery design was published in the September issue (No.4) of the German BDSM magazine Schlagzeilen in 1989.

== Description in literature ==
Simplified depiction of the Triskelion ring as described in the original book

The ring mentioned in the BDSM novel Story of O was quite different from what is most commonly known as the "Ring of O" today. The novel describes the ring as shaped similarly to a signet ring (with a seal disk on top which was relatively large for a woman's ring), made out of dull-gray polished iron, lined with gold on the inside, and with a golden Triskelion on its top area.

The ring's symbolic meaning in the novel differs quite a bit from the one commonly used among BDSM practitioners today. In the book, such a ring is worn by a female "slave" after she has finished her training at Roissy. Those wearing the ring are obliged to be obedient to any man who belongs to the secret society of Roissy (whose emblem is the triskelion), and must allow him to do absolutely everything with them that he pleases. This stands in strong contrast to the ring's meaning today. People indicate by wearing such rings that they are interested in BDSM, and sometimes by the hand they wear it on whether they are a Dom (Dominant) or a Sub (Submissive); usually right for Submissive, left for Dominant.

== Actual use ==
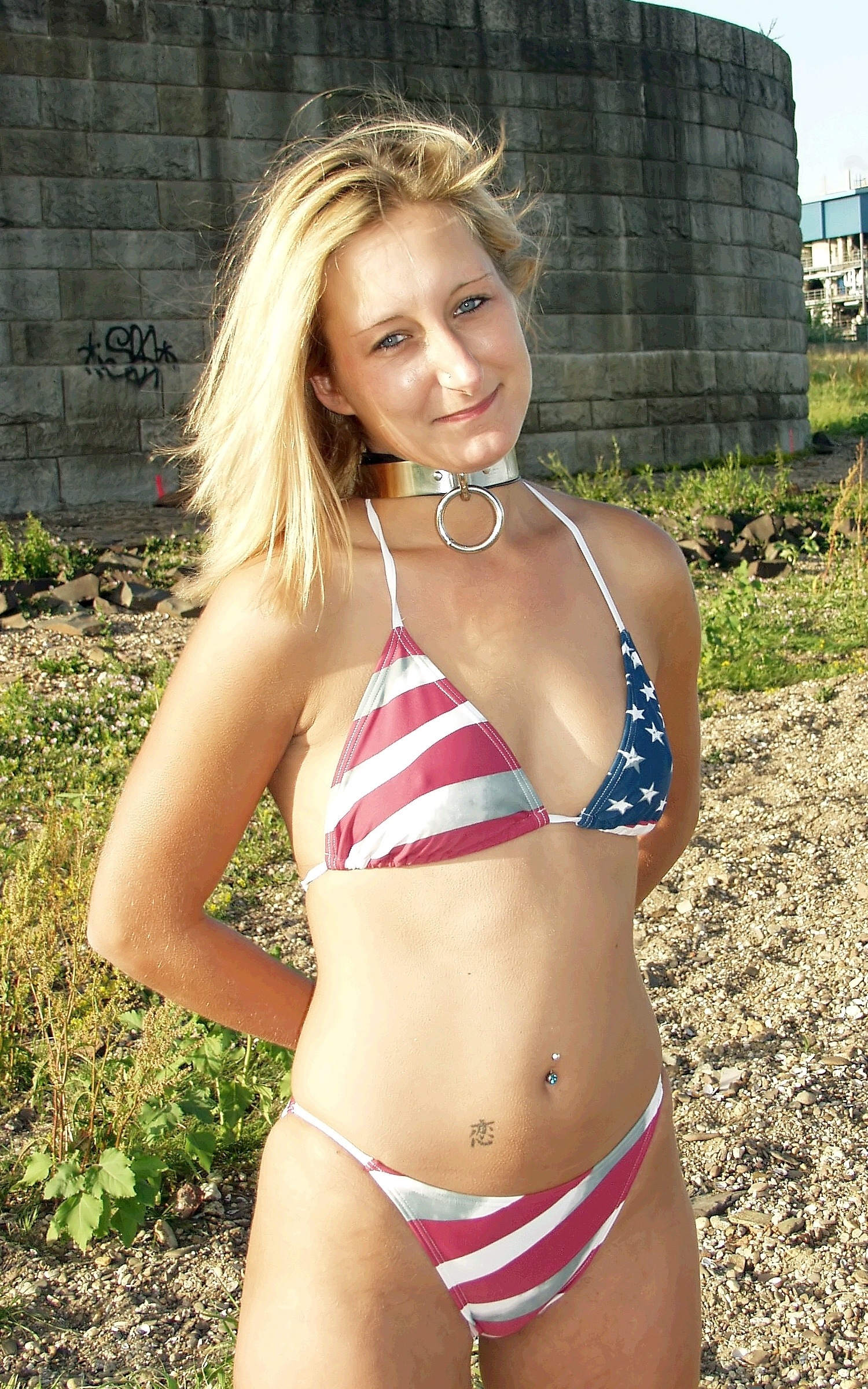
Female model posed as a submissive wearing a collar in the design of the Ring of O

The first film adaptation of the novel Story of O showed a design consisting of a cylindrical steel ring with an attached ball holding an even smaller toroidal ring (which could swivel in one direction). This alluded to the leather collar and bracelets, each with a metal ring, that had been locked onto O during her training.

The first image of this jewellery design was published in the September issue (No.4) of the German BDSM magazine Schlagzeilen in 1989.

People indicate by wearing rings like the Ring of O that they are interested in BDSM, and sometimes by the hand they wear it on whether they are a Dom (Dominant) or a Sub (Submissive); usually right for Submissive, left for Dominant.

The BDSM rights flag with triskelion-type emblem (not copyrighted); the usage of the triskelion-type shape within a circle as a BDSM symbol derives from the Ring of O.

A common symbol in the BDSM community is a derivation of a triskelion shape within a circle; its BDSM usage derives from the Ring of O. The BDSM Emblem Project claims copyright over one particular specified form of the triskelion symbol; other variants of the triskelion are free from such copyright claims.

== As a collar ==
The term O Ring is sometimes used to refer to collars as well (contrasting with D-ring collars). In this context it can describe a collar with one large ring for fastening. Collars featuring such rings are often worn by submissives to indicate that they are in a steady relationship.

== Literature ==
- Kathrin Passig and Ira Strübel: Die Wahl der Qual. Rowohlt-Verlag 2004, ISBN 3-499-61692-0 (German)
- Matthias T. J. Grimme: Das SM-Handbuch. Charon-Verlag 2002, ISBN 3-931406-01-6 (German)
