= The 5th Monkey =

1990 film by Éric Rochat

- Theatrical release poster
- Directed by: Éric Rochat
- Screenplay by: Éric Rochat
- Based on: Le Cinquieme Singe by Jacques Zibi
- Produced by: Menahem Golan
- Starring: Ben Kingsley; Silvia De Carvalho; Mika Lins; Vera Fischer
- Cinematography: Gideon Porath
- Edited by: Alain Jakubowicz; Fabien D. Tordjmann
- Music by: Robert O. Ragland
- Production company: 21st Century Film Corporation
- Distributed by: Columbia Pictures
- Release date: October 5, 1990
- Running time: 93 minutes
- Countries: United States; Brazil
- Language: English

The 5th Monkey is a 1990 drama film directed and written by Éric Rochat and starring Ben Kingsley. The film was based on the novel Le Cinquieme Singe by Jacques Zibi. The Cannon Group founder Menahem Golan produced via his 21st Century Film Corporation, following the demise of Cannon.

The original music score was composed by Robert O. Ragland.

== Plot ==
Cunda (Kingsley) lives deep in the Brazilian rainforest and is intent on making enough money so he can marry a widow in his village. However, his trade - capturing snakes for scientists - pays very little money, and he is in direct competition with other suitors.

One day, Cunda is bitten by a snake, and he crawls to the river to recover. While going through the agonizing recovery, he has an hallucination of four chimpanzees sitting in the river. Recovered, he returns home and finds the four chimpanzees waiting for him, and his efforts to shoo them away fail. Knowing that chimpanzees are not native to Brazil, he decides that they are a kind of supernatural gift for him. Believing this, he decides to take them to "the city" to sell them.

The journey isn't easy from the start; he discovers that he can't tie them on a rope and drag them, and the only way is to coax them. They stumble into a gold-panning camp, where Cunda is forced to work in order to pay off an old debt. When one of the "monkeys" (chimpanzees) is taken as payment, Cunda must figure how to retrieve him and escape. Later, he, the chimps and the adults of a village are kidnapped by mercenaries. Cunda and the chimps escape, along with a village woman who refuses to leave his side. Arriving at a small town, a confusing sequence results in one of the chimps disappearing, and Cunda becoming the servant of the local rich woman who has taken it upon herself to take care of the chimps. Cunda now has to solve these two problems, and deal with the fact of the village woman's attraction to him plus his growing fondness for the chimpanzees he holds captive.

== Cast ==
- Ben Kingsley as Cunda
- Silvia De Carvalho as Maria
- Mika Lins as Octavia
- Vera Fischer as Mrs. Watts
