= Story of O =

1954 erotic novel by Anne Desclos

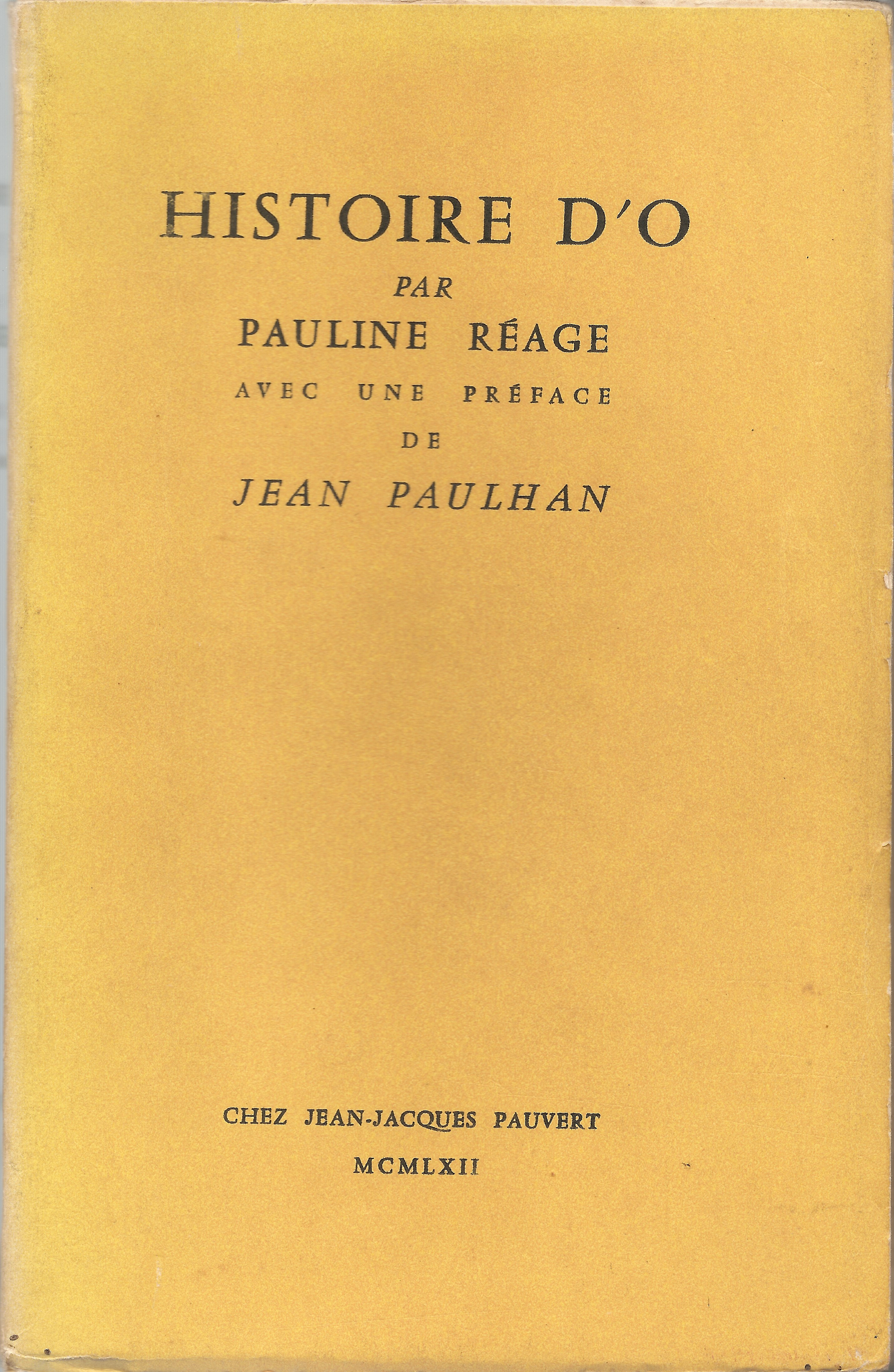
- Cover of the 1962 edition
- Author: Pauline Réage
- Language: French
- Genre: Erotic novel
- Publisher: Jean-Jacques Pauvert
- Publication date: 1954
- Publication place: France
- Media type: Print

Story of O (French: Histoire d'O [istwaʁ do]) is an erotic novel written by French author Anne Desclos under the pen name Pauline Réage, with the original French text published in 1954 by Jean-Jacques Pauvert.

Desclos did not reveal herself as the author until 1994, 40 years after the initial publication. Desclos stated she wrote the novel as a series of love letters to her lover Jean Paulhan, who had admired the work of the Marquis de Sade. The novel shares with the latter themes such as love, dominance, and submission.

== Plot ==
Story of O is a tale of female submission involving a beautiful Parisian fashion photographer named O, who is taught to be constantly available for oral, vaginal, and anal intercourse, offering herself to any male who belongs to the same secret society as her lover. She is regularly stripped, blindfolded, chained, and whipped; her anus is widened by increasingly large plugs; her labium is pierced and her buttocks are branded.

The story begins when O's lover, René, brings her to the château in Roissy, where she is trained to serve the members of an elite club. After this initial training, as a demonstration of their bond and his generosity, René hands O to his elder stepbrother Sir Stephen, a more severe master. René wants O to learn to serve someone whom she does not love, and someone who does not love her. Over the course of this training, O falls in love with Sir Stephen and believes him to be in love with her as well. During the summer, Sir Stephen sends O to an old mansion in Samois solely inhabited by women for advanced training and body modifications related to submission. There she agrees to receive permanent marks of Sir Stephen's ownership, in the form of a brand and a steel tag hanging from a labia piercing.

Meanwhile René has encouraged O to seduce Jacqueline, a vain fashion model, and lure her to Roissy. Jacqueline is repulsed when she first sees O's chains and scars, although O herself is proud of her condition as a willing slave. But Jacqueline's younger half-sister becomes enamored of O, and begs to be taken to Roissy.

At the climax, O is presented as a sexual slave, nude but for an owl-like mask and a leash attached to her piercing, before a large party of guests who treat her solely as an object. Afterward, she is shared by Sir Stephen and an associate of his who is referred to only as "The Commander".

Some early editions included several different variations of an epilogue which note that Sir Stephen later abandoned O, though there is debate as to whether Desclos intended it to be included in the finished work; in one such version, O is so distraught by the threat of this abandonment that she insists she would rather die and asks for permission to commit suicide, which is granted.

One version of the Roissy triskelion ring described in the book

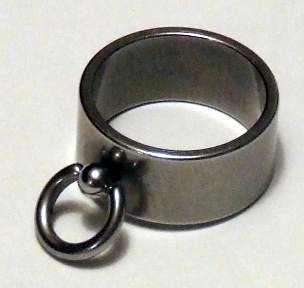
Movie-style Ring of O, as sold in Europe.

== Publishing history ==
In February 1955, Story of O won the French literature prize Prix des Deux Magots, but the French authorities still brought obscenity charges against the publisher. The charges were rejected by the courts, but a publicity ban was imposed for a number of years.

Olympia Press published the first English edition in 1965. Eliot Fremont-Smith (of The New York Times) called its publication "a significant event".

== Criticism ==
A critical view of the novel is that it is about, and derives its erotic power from, the ultimate objectification of a woman. The heroine has the shortest possible name. Though this is in fact a shortening of "Odile", it could also stand for "object" or "orifice", an O being a symbolic representation of any "hole". The novel was strongly criticized by many feminists for glorifying abuse of women. An article by Susan Griffin that appears in Against Sadomasochism: A Radical Feminist Analysis (reprinted from Griffin’s book Pornography and Silence with an introduction) criticizes the novel; Griffin argues that Story of O shows "how a pornographic society turns a woman's heart against herself."

When the film Story of O was released, L'Express magazine ran a feature on the novel and film. This resulted in L'Express being picketed by feminists from the group Mouvement de libération des femmes, who found the novel and film objectionable. Journalist François Chalais also criticized Story of O, claiming the novel glorified violence; he described the novel as "bringing the Gestapo into the boudoir".

== Hidden identities ==
The book's author Anne Desclos used a pen name, then later used another pen name, before finally, just before her death, revealing her true identity. Her lover, Jean Paulhan, wrote the preface as if the author were unknown to him.

According to Geraldine Bedell, writing in 2004, "Pauline Réage, the author, was a pseudonym, and many people thought that the book could only have been written by a man. The writer's true identity was not revealed until ten years ago, when, in an interview with John de St. Jorre, a British journalist and sometime foreign correspondent of The Observer, an impeccably dressed 86-year-old intellectual called Dominique Aury acknowledged that the fantasies of castles, masks and debauchery were hers." According to several other sources, however, Dominique Aury was itself a pseudonym of Anne Desclos, born 23 September 1907 in Rochefort-sur-Mer, France, and deceased 26 April 1998 (at age 90) in Paris.

The Grove Press edition (U.S., 1965) was translated by editor Richard Seaver (who had lived in France for many years) under the pseudonym Sabine d'Estrée.

=== Jean Paulhan ===
Jean Paulhan, the author's lover and the person to whom she wrote Story of O in the form of love letters, wrote the preface, "Happiness in Slavery". Paulhan admired the Marquis de Sade's work and told Desclos that a woman could not write like de Sade. Desclos took this as a challenge and wrote the book. Paulhan was so impressed that he sent it to a publisher. In the preface, he goes out of his way to appear as if he does not know who wrote it. In one part he says, "But from the beginning to end, the story of O is managed rather like some brilliant feat. It reminds you more of a speech than of a mere effusion; of a letter rather than a secret diary. But to whom is the letter addressed? Whom is the speech trying to convince? Whom can we ask? I don't even know who you are. That you are a woman I have little doubt." Paulhan also explains his own belief that the themes in the book depict the true nature of women. At times, the preface (when read with the knowledge of the relationship between Paulhan and the author), seems to be a continuation of the conversation between them.

In an interview Paulhan explained that O, in a religious-like obsession, was seeking the loss of responsibility for her body and mind much like many religious women seek to surrender themselves to the mercy of God. In both cases it is the joy of destruction. Paulhan was also quoted: "To be killed by someone you love strikes me as the epitome of ecstasy". Discussing the ending, Paulhan states, "I too was surprised by the end. And nothing you can say will convince me that it is the real end. That in reality (so to speak) your heroine convinces Sir Stephen to consent to her death."

One critic has seen Paulhan's essay as consistent with other themes in his work, including his interest in erotica, his "mystification" of love and sexual relationships, and a view of women that is arguably sexist.

== Legacy ==
Emmanuelle Arsan claimed the Story of O inspired her to write her own erotic novel Emmanuelle (1967).

A sequel to Story of O, Retour à Roissy (Return to Roissy, but often translated as Return to the Chateau, Continuing the Story of O), was published in 1969 in French, again with Jean-Jacques Pauvert, éditeur. It was published again in English by Grove Press, Inc., in 1971. It is not known whether this work is by the same author as the original.

The town Samois-sur-Seine is mentioned in Story of O as the location of the fictional mansion managed by Anne-Marie, a lesbian dominatrix. In 1978, the name Samois was adopted by a lesbian-feminist BDSM organization based in San Francisco that existed from 1978 to 1983. It was the first lesbian BDSM group in the United States.

In 2007, the National Leather Association International inaugurated awards for excellence in SM/fetish/leather writing. The categories include the Pauline Reage (a pen name of Anne Desclos, author of Story of O) award for fiction novel.

In 2020, Anne Desclos was inducted into the Leather Hall of Fame.

== Adaptations ==
=== Film ===
American experimental director Kenneth Anger made a 20-minute short film version, l'Histoire d'O, in 1961.

French director Henri-Georges Clouzot wanted to adapt the novel to film for many years, which was eventually done by director Just Jaeckin in 1975 as Histoire d'O (Story of O) produced by Eric Rochat and Gérard Lorin, starring Corinne Cléry and Udo Kier. The film met with far less acclaim than the book. In the United Kingdom it was refused a certificate by the BBFC, and was not passed until February 2000.

In 1975, American director Gerard Damiano, well known for Deep Throat (1972) and The Devil in Miss Jones (1973), created the movie The Story of Joanna, highly influenced by the Story of O, by combining motifs from one of the book's chapters and from Jean-Paul Sartre's No Exit.

In 1979, Danish director Lars von Trier made the short movie entitled Menthe – la bienheureuse, as an homage to Story of O. His 2005 film Manderlay was also inspired by the book, particularly Paulhan's introduction.

Five years later, in 1984, actress Sandra Wey starred as "O" in Story of O: Chapter 2, written, directed and produced by Eric Rochat.

In 1992, a Brazilian miniseries in 10 episodes entitled A História de O starring Claudia Cepeda was written, directed and produced by Eric Rochat, who was the producer of the original 1975 movie.

In 2002, another version of O was released, called The Story of O: Untold Pleasures, with Danielle Ciardi playing the title character.

=== Comics ===
In 1975, it was adapted for comics by the Italian artist Guido Crepax. Both the original and Crepax's adaptation were parodied for comics in 2007 by Charles Alverson and John Linton Roberson.

=== Documentaries ===
Writer of O, a 2004 documentary film by Pola Rapaport, mixed interviews with re-enactments of certain scenes from the book. In the documentary, the real author of Story of O, Dominique Aury (actually a pen name of Anne Desclos), talks about the book A Girl in Love. This book was written about how Story of O was written.

A documentary was also made for BBC Radio 4 entitled The Story of O: The Vice Francaise, presented by Rowan Pelling, former editor of the Erotic Review, which looked at the history of the book and its author Anne Desclos.

Erotica: A Journey into Female Sexuality, a documentary film by Maya Gallus produced by Red Queen Productions in 1997, featured the final interview with 90-year-old Dominique Aury (a pen name of Story of O author Anne Desclos) before she died. In the film, she recounts the extraordinary love story behind Story of O and marvels that she has reached such a grand age.

== References in culture ==
The Irish songwriter Damien Rice mentions Story of O in his song 'Amie': "Amie, come sit on my wall / And read me the story of 'O...'". The album which "Amie" is part of is called O.

In season 5, episode 3 of the sitcom Frasier, titled "Halloween", Roz dresses as "O" for a literary character Halloween party.

The title of the Nine Inch Nails song "Happiness in Slavery" is taken from the preface of the novel.

== See also ==
- 1975 in film
- The Claiming of Sleeping Beauty
- Dominance and submission
- Fruits of Passion
- Sadism and masochism in fiction
- Story of O - Chapter 2
- Venus in Furs
