= Labioscrotal swelling =

Embryonic structure of the reproductive system

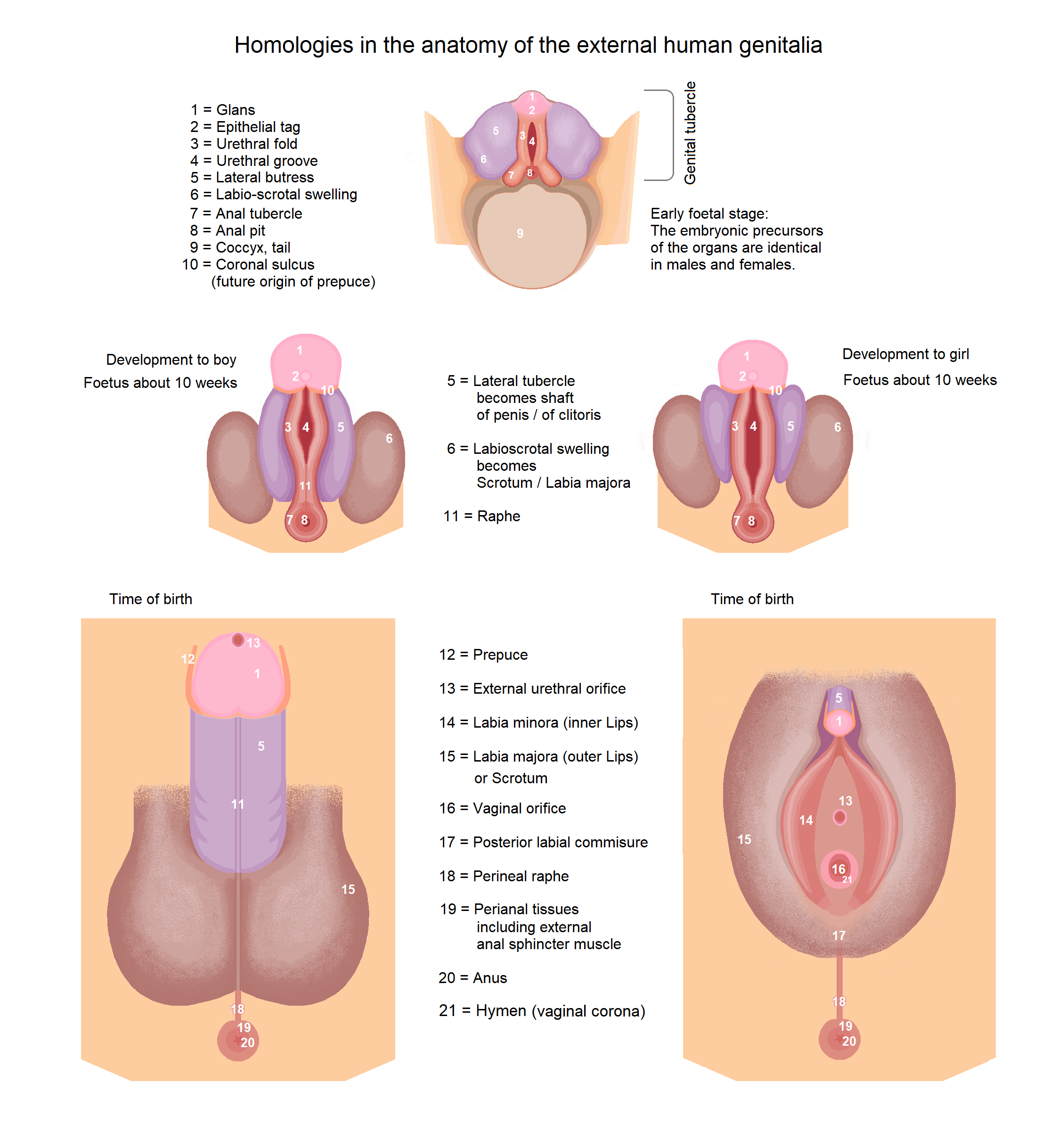
- Stages in the development of the external sexual organs in the male and female.

Details
- Precursor: Genital tubercle
- Gives rise to: Labia majora, scrotum
- System: Reproductive system

Identifiers
- Latin: tuberculum labioscrotale
- TE: swelling_by_E5.7.4.0.1.0.4 E5.7.4.0.1.0.4

The labioscrotal swellings (genital swellings or labioscrotal folds) are paired structures in the mammalian embryo that represent the final stage of development of the caudal end of the external genitals before sexual differentiation. In humans, the two swellings merge:

- In the female, they become the posterior labial commissure. The sides of the genital tubercle grow backward as the genital swellings, which ultimately form the labia majora; the tubercle itself becomes the mons pubis.
- In the male, they become the scrotum.
