= Posterior labial arteries =

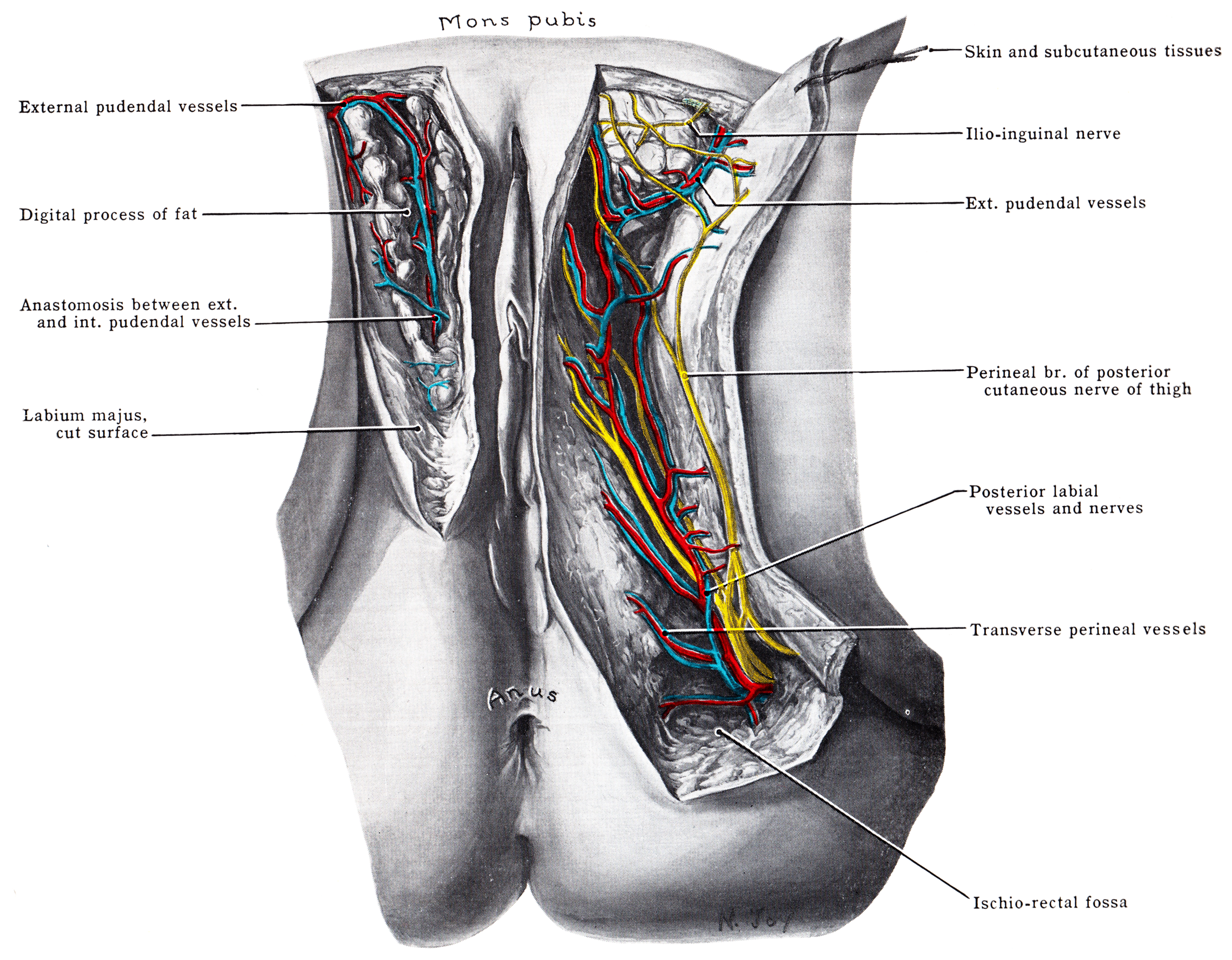
- Posterior labial arteries labeled below in red

Details
- Source: Internal pudendal artery
- Vein: Posterior labial veins

Identifiers
- Latin: rami labiales posteriores arteriae pudendae internae
- TA98: A12.2.15.041F
- TA2: 4344

The posterior labial arteries are branches of the internal pudendal artery. The posterior labial arteries are branches of the internal pudendal artery that vascularize and supply blood to the posterior part of the labia majora and labia minora in women.
