= Labia majora =

Folds of skin that contain and protect the vulva's other parts

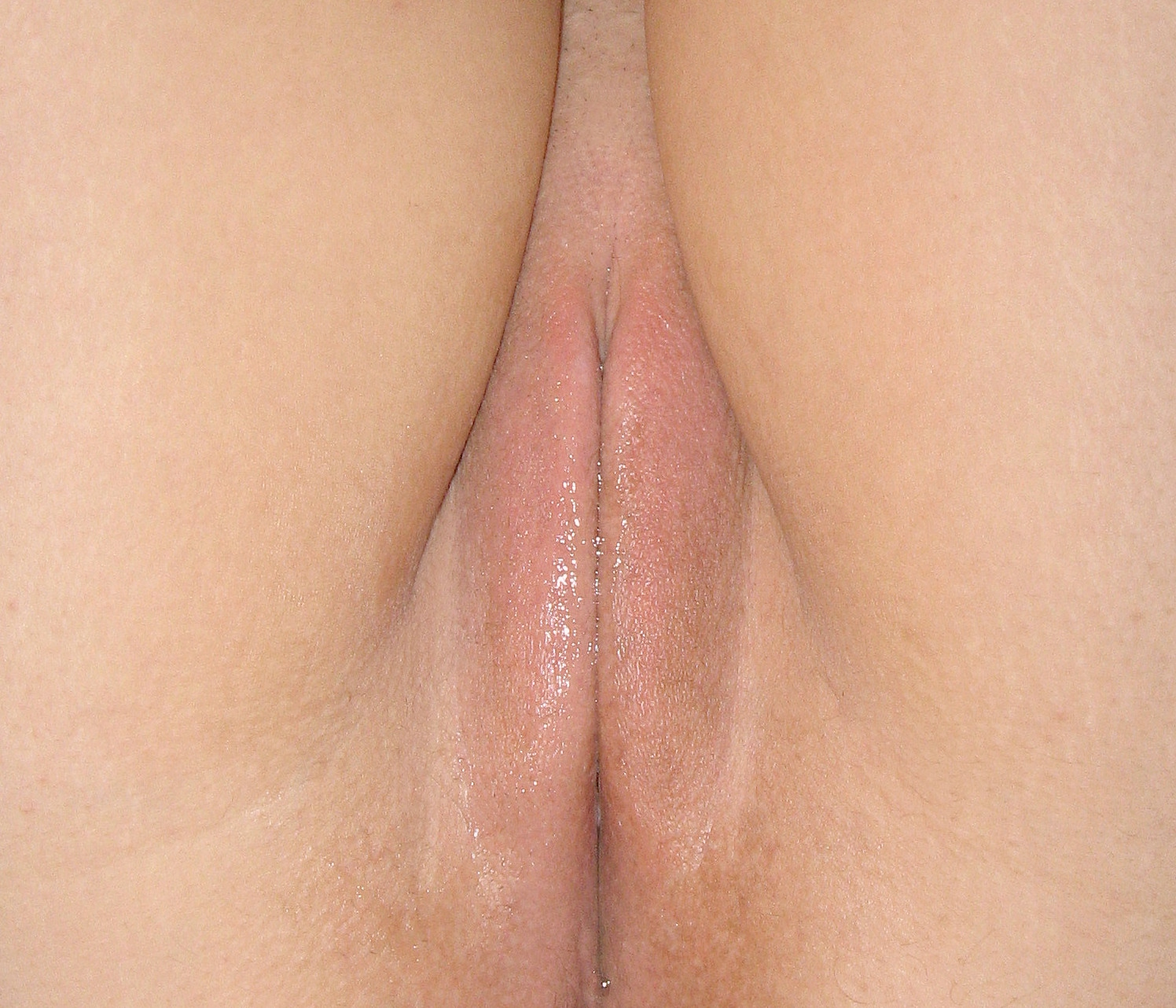
- Labia majora of a human

Details
- Precursor: Labioscrotal swellings
- Part of: Vulva
- Artery: Deep external pudendal artery, superficial external pudendal artery, posterior labial arteries
- Vein: Posterior labial veins, internal pudendal veins
- Nerve: Perineal branches of posterior femoral cutaneous nerve, genital branch of genitofemoral nerve, posterior labial nerves, anterior labial nerves, pudendal nerve, perineal nerve

Identifiers
- Latin: labium majus pudendi
- TA98: A09.2.01.003
- TA2: 3549
- FMA: 20367

In primates, and specifically in humans, the labia majora (sing.: labium majus), also known as the outer lips or outer labia, are two prominent longitudinal skin folds that extend downward and backward from the mons pubis to the perineum. Together with the labia minora, they form the labia of the vulva. The labia majora are homologous to the male scrotum.

== Etymology ==
Labia majora is the Latin plural for big ("major") lips. The Latin term labium/labia is used in anatomy for several usually paired parallel structures, but in English, it is mostly applied to two pairs of parts of the vulva—labia majora and labia minora. Traditionally, to avoid confusion with other lip-like structures of the body, the vulvar labia were termed by anatomists in Latin as labia majora (or minora) pudendi.

== Embryology ==
Embryologically, they develop from labioscrotal folds. The labia majora after puberty may become of a darker color than the skin outside them and grow pubic hair on their external surface.

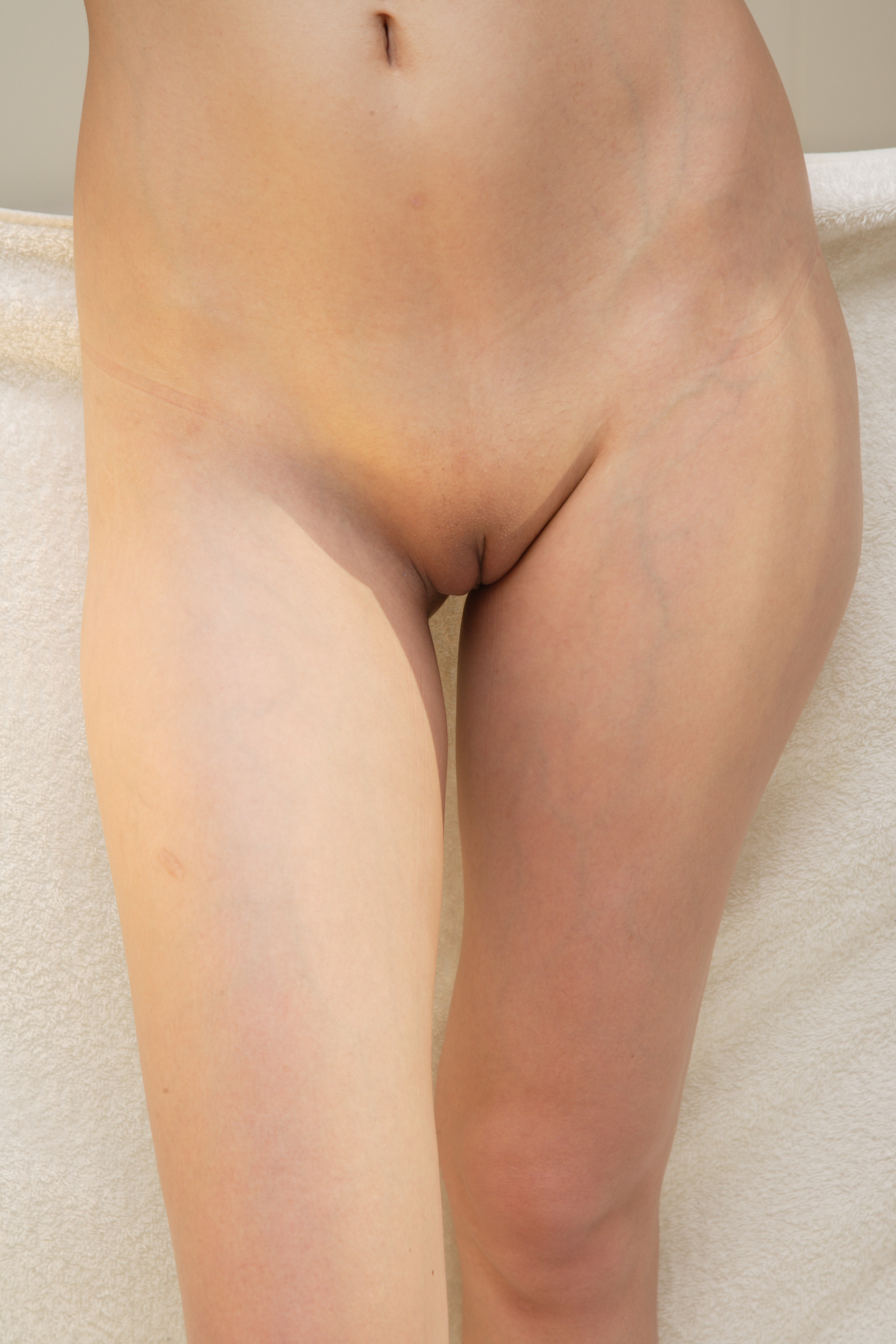
Vulva, with labia majora

== Function and structure ==
Labia majora of woman lying down with legs parted.

The main function of the labia majora is to cover and protect the other parts of the vulva. The labia majora contain the labia minora, interlabial sulci, clitoral hood, clitoral glans, frenulum clitoridis, the Hart's Line, and the vulval vestibule, where the external openings of the urethra and the vagina are located. Each labium majus has two surfaces, an outer, pigmented and covered with strong, pubic hair; and an inner, smooth and beset with large sebaceous follicles. The labia majora are covered with squamous epithelium. Between the two, there is a considerable quantity of areolar tissue and fat, besides vessels, nerves, and glands. Below the skin of the labia majora, there is a tissue called the dartos muliebris, which gives them a wrinkled appearance.

=== Pudendal cleft ===
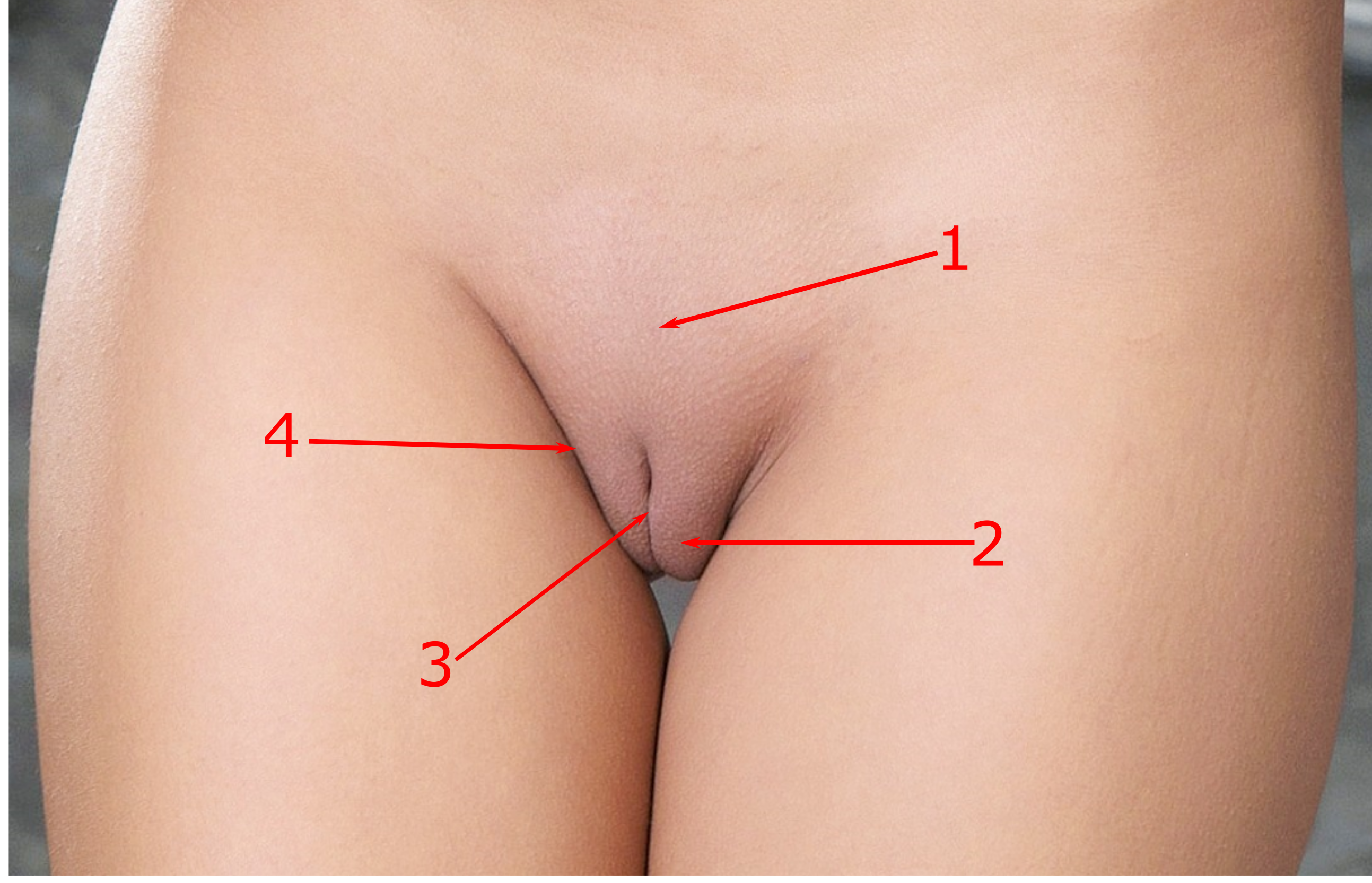
Front view of the vulva. Pudendal cleft at 3.

The labia majora constitute the lateral boundaries of the pudendal cleft. The pudendal cleft, also known as the vulvar cleft or cleft of Venus (rima vulvae or rima pudendi in Latin), is a vertical fissure between the labia majora starting at the basal point of the mons pubis. After puberty, the clitoral hood and the labia minora can protrude into the pudendal cleft to a variable degree.

=== Commissures ===
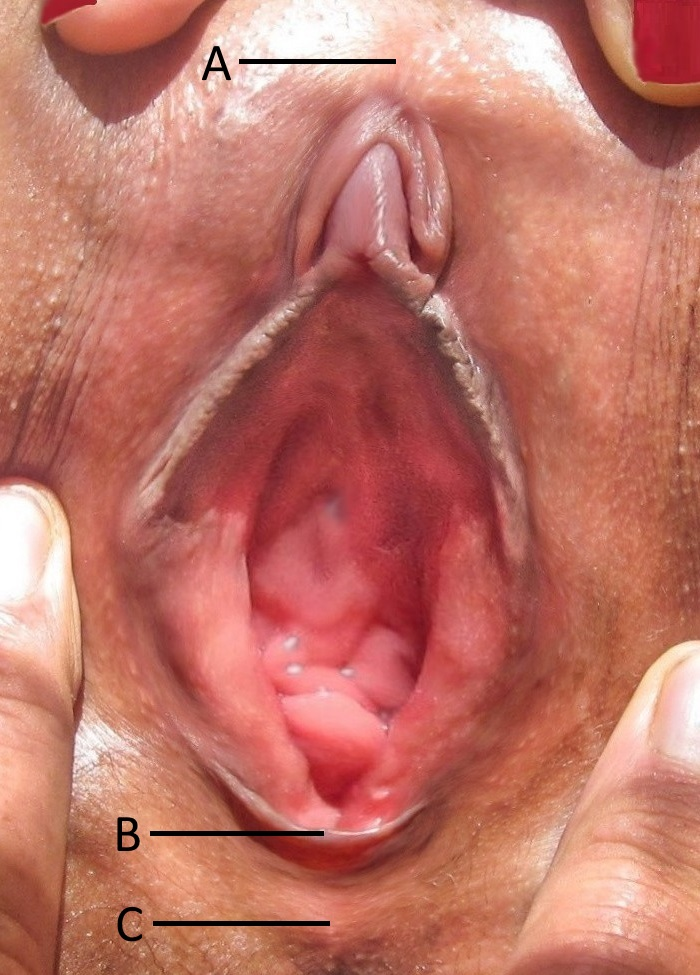
A) anterior commissure, B) fourchette, C) posterior commissure

The labia majora are thicker in front, and form the anterior labial commissure where they meet below the mons pubis. Posteriorly, they are not really joined, but appear to become lost in the neighboring integument, ending close to, and nearly parallel to, each other. Together with the connecting skin between them, they form another commissure, the posterior labial commissure, which is also the posterior boundary of the vulva. The interval between the posterior commissure and the anus, from 2.5 to 3 cm in length, constitutes the perineum. The anterior region of the perineum is known as the urogenital triangle, which separates it from the anal region. Between the labia majora and the inner thighs are the labiocrural folds. Between the labia majora and labia minora are the interlabial sulci. Labia majora atrophy after menopause.

== In non-human primates ==
While the labia majora are present in all female primates, many are not retained through adulthood, becoming inconspicuous around that period. Primates besides humans that always have visible labia majora are bonobos, strepsirrhines, tarsiers, cebid monkeys, and gibbons.

In non-primate female mammals, the labia majora are absent since the labioscrotal swellings have disappeared as a fetus. Because of this, the pudendal cleft refers to the slit between the labia vulvae in those mammals.

== Use in grafting ==
The fat pad of the labia majora can be used as a graft, often as a so-called "Martius labial fat pad graft", and can be used, for example, in urethrolysis.

== See also ==
- Femalia
- Labia pride
