= Jean Paulhan =

French writer, literary critic and publisher

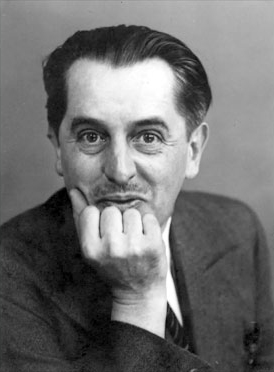
- Paulhan in 1938
- Born: 2 December 1884; Nîmes, Gard, France
- Died: 9 October 1968 (aged 83); Paris, France
- Occupations: Writer, literary critic, publisher, translator
- Partner: Anne Desclos
- Relatives: Frédéric Paulhan (father)
- Writing career
- Notable works: The Flowers of Tarbes, or Terror in Literature (1936)

Jean Paulhan (French: [pɔlɑ̃]; 2 December 1884 – 9 October 1968) was a French writer, literary critic and publisher, director of the literary magazine Nouvelle Revue Française (NRF) from 1925 to 1940 and from 1946 to 1968. He was a member (Seat 6, 1963–68) of the Académie française. He was born in Nîmes (Gard) and died in Paris.

The author Anne Desclos revealed that she had written the novel Story of O as a series of love letters to her lover Paulhan, who had admired the work of the Marquis de Sade.

== Biography ==
Paulhan's father was the philosopher Frédéric Paulhan^{:11} and his mother was Jeanne Thérond. From 1908 to 1910 he worked as a teacher in Madagascar, and he later translated Malagasy poems, or Hainteny, into French. Paulhan's translations attracted the interest of Guillaume Apollinaire and Paul Éluard.

He served as Jacques Rivière's secretary at the NRF, until 1925 when he succeeded him as the journal's editor. In 1935 he, Henri Michaux, Giuseppe Ungaretti, Bernard Groethuysen and others launched a similar but more luxuriously-produced journal Mesures, under the direction of Henry Church. One of his most famous works of literary criticism was The Flowers of Tarbes, or Terror in Literature (1936), a study of the nature of language in fiction. Paulhan also wrote several autobiographical short stories; English translations of several appeared in the collection Progress in Love on the Slow Side (1994).

During the Second World War and the German occupation, Paulhan resigned from his position as director of the NRF rather than collaborate, and recommended Pierre Drieu la Rochelle as his successor. An early and active member of the French Resistance he was arrested by the Gestapo. After the war he founded Cahiers de la Pléiade and in 1953 re-launched the NRF. Later in life, Paulhan provoked controversy by opposing independence for Algeria, and supporting the French military during the Algerian War; this resulted in a rift between Paulhan and his friend Maurice Blanchot.

The author Anne Desclos revealed that she had written the novel Story of O as a series of love letters to her lover Paulhan, who had admired the work of the Marquis de Sade.

== Works ==
- Les Hain-Teny Merinas. Poésies populaires malgaches (translator and editor; Paris: P. Geuthner, 1913)
- Le Guerrier appliqué (Paris: E. Sansot, 1917)
- Jacob Cow le Pirate, ou Si les mots sont des signes (Paris: Au sans pareil, 1921)
- Le Pont traversé (Paris: Camille Bloch, 1921)
- Expérience du proverbe (Paris: Hors commerce, 1925)
- La Guérison sévère (Paris: NRF, 1925)
- Sur un défaut de la pensée critique (Paris: Hors commerce, 1928)
- Les Hain-Teny. Poésie obscure (Monaco: Société de Conférences, 1930)
- Entretien sur des faits-divers (Paris: Société des Médecins Bibliophiles, 1930)
- Les Fleurs de Tarbes ou La terreur dans les Lettres (Paris: Gallimard, 1936, 1941)
- Jacques Decour (1943)
- Aytre qui perd l'habitude (1920, 1943, reissued 2006)
- Clef de la poésie, qui permet de distinguer le vrai du faux en toute observation, ou Doctrine touchant la rime, le rythme, le vers, le poète et la poésie (1945)
- F.F. ou Le Critique (Gallimard, 1945; reissued by Éditions Claire Paulhan, 1998)
- Sept causes célèbres (1946)
- La Métromanie, ou Les dessous de la capitale (1946, reissued 2006)
- Braque le Patron (1946)
- Lettre aux membres du C.N.E. (1940)
- Sept nouvelles causes célèbres (1947, reissued 2006)
- Guide d'un petit voyage en Suisse (1947, reissued 2006)
- Dernière lettre (1947)
- Le Berger d’Écosse (1948, reissued 2006)
- Fautrier l'Enragé (1949)
- Petit-Livre-à-déchirer (1949)
- Trois causes célèbres (1950)
- Les Causes célèbres (1950, reissued 2006)
- Lettre au médecin (1950, reissued 2006)
- Les Gardiens (1951, reissued 2006)
- Le Marquis de Sade et sa complice ou Les revanches de la Pudeur (1951)
- Petite préface à toute critique (1951)
- L'Aveuglette (Paris: Gallimard, 1952)
- Lettre aux directeurs de la Résistance (1952)
- La Preuve par l'étymologie (1953)
- Les Paroles transparentes, avec des lithographies de Georges Braque (1955)
- Le Clair et l'Obscur (1958)
- G. Braque (1958)
- De mauvais sujets, gravures de Marc Chagall (1958, reissued 2006)
- Karskaya (1959)
- Lettres (1961)
- L'Art informel (1962)
- Fautrier l'enragé (1962)
- Progrès en amour assez lents (1966, reissued 2006)
- Choix de lettres I 1917–1936, "La littérature est une fête" (1986)
- "Choix de lettres II 1937-1945, Traité des jours sombres" (1992)
- Choix de lettres III 1946-1968, Le Don des langues (1996)
- La Vie est pleine de choses redoutables (Seghers; reissued by Claire Paulhan, 1990)
- "Lettres de Madagascar, 1907-1910", Éditions Claire Paulhan (2007)
- "Œuvres complètes", edited by Bernard Baillaud, Volume I, Gallimard (2006).
