= Claude Bernard-Aubert =

French film director

- Born: 26 May 1930; Durtal, Maine-et-Loire, France
- Died: 25 June 2018 (aged 88); Le Mans, Sarthe, France
- Other names: Claude Orgel; Burd Tranbaree
- Occupations: Director, Producter, Writer
- Years active: 1957-1990 (Film and TV)

Claude Bernard-Aubert (1930–2018) was a French film director, screenwriter and producer. He worked as a photojournalist during the First Indochina War between 1949 and 1954.

== Selected filmography ==
- Patrouille de choc (1957)
- Checkerboard (1959)
- My Baby Is Black! (1961)
- Dawn on the Third Day (1962)
- À fleur de peau (1962)
- The Gates of Fire (1972)
- The Dominici Affair (1973)
- L'aigle et la colombe (1974)
- Les filles du régiment (1978)
- Charlie Bravo (1980)

== Bibliography ==
- Rège, Philippe. Encyclopedia of French Film Directors, Volume 1. Scarecrow Press, 2009.
