= Laurent Desclos =

Electrical engineer

Laurent Desclos is an electrical engineer with Ethertronics, Inc. in San Diego, California. He was named a Fellow of the Institute of Electrical and Electronics Engineers (IEEE) in 2015 for his development of cellphone antenna technology.
