= Frédéric Paulhan =

French philosopher

Frédéric Paulhan (21 April 1856 – 14 March 1931) was a French philosopher, born in Nîmes.

He came from a family of merchants of Huguenot ancestry, and was a brilliant student at school in Nîmes. He left without graduating, and spent a few years without a recognised profession, studying and writing and developing an interest in philosophy and Republican political movements. In 1877 Paulhan contributed to the Revue Philosophique of Théodule Ribot. Paulhan became liable for military service when his assigned number was drawn in a lottery, but he was released from serving because of his stutter, which also made it difficult for him to teach.

After a political upset in the Nîmes city administration, which favoured Republicans, Paulhan was appointed librarian in 1881. During the years he held this post, Paulhan applied positivist methods to the institution, modernising it. He married Jeanne Thérond in 1884, and that same year their son was born, the future writer and editor Jean Paulhan. Frédéric Paulhan resigned his post in December 1896, affected by political instability in the municipality, and he moved to Paris. Here he continued to write, and he also built up an art collection of etchings, drawings, pastels along with a few paintings, purchased at auction. This collection was sold in 1934.

Paulhan entered the Academy of Moral and Political Sciences in 1902, sponsored by Ribot. He was awarded the Prix Jean-Reynaud in 1928. Paulhan was a freethinker, a Dreyfusard and possibly a Freemason; his work has importance in the current of French psychology. Among his books are Les caractères (1894), Les mensonges du caractère (1905), Le mensonge dans l'art (1907) and Le mensonge du monde (1921).

Frédéric Paulhan died in Paris on 14 March 1931. He is buried in the cemetery at Bagneux under a headstone carved with Masonic symbols.
