= Jean-Jacques Pauvert =

French publisher

Jean-Jacques Pauvert (French: [povɛʁ]; 8 April 1926 – 27 September 2014) was a French publisher, notable for publishing the work of the Marquis de Sade in the early 1950s and as the first publisher of the Story of O (1954) and the first edition of Kenneth Anger's Hollywood Babylon (1959).

Pauvert was born in Paris. In addition to his other publications, he published the first French edition of Henry David Thoreau's Civil Disobedience in 1968. He died, aged 88, in Toulon.
