= Posterior labial veins =

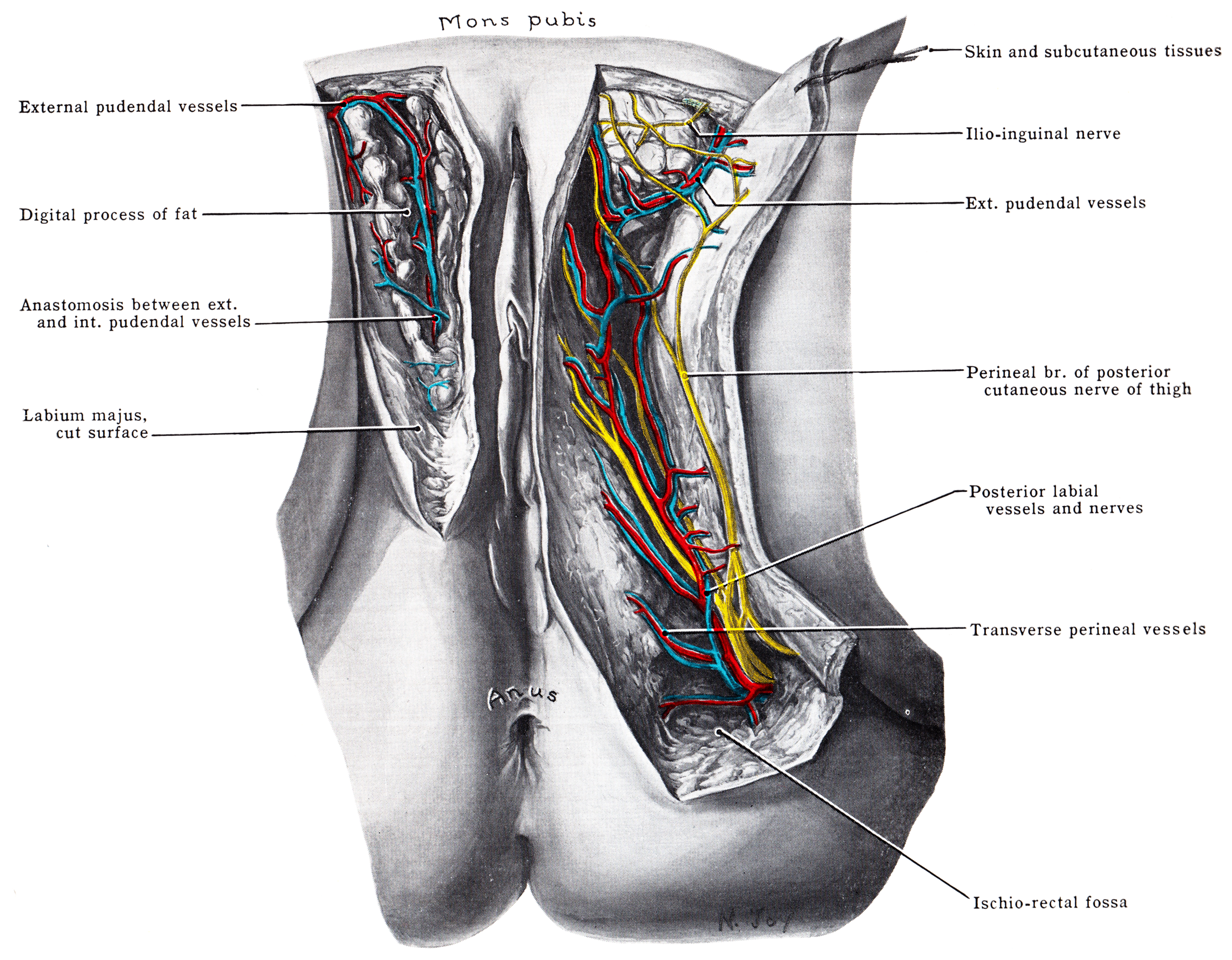
- Posterior labial veins labeled below in blue

Details
- Drains from: Labia majora
- Drains to: Vesical venous plexus
- Artery: Posterior labial arteries

Identifiers
- Latin: venae labiales posteriores
- TA98: A12.3.10.022F
- TA2: 5034
- FMA: 75395

The posterior labial veins are veins which drain to the vesical venous plexus.
