= Anne Desclos =

French journalist and novelist (1907–1998)

- Born: 23 September 1907; Rochefort, France
- Died: 27 April 1998 (aged 90); Corbeil-Essonnes, France
- Occupations: Journalist; novelist
- Spouse: Raymond d'Argila (m. 1929, divorced)
- Partners: Thierry Maulnier; Jean Paulhan; Édith Thomas
- Children: 1
- Writing career
- Pen name: Dominique Airy; Pauline Réage
- Genres: Prose
- Notable work: Story of O (1954)

Anne Cécile Desclos (French: [deklo]; 23 September 1907 – 27 April 1998) was a French literary critic, journalist, and novelist who wrote under the pen names Dominique Aury and Pauline Réage. She is best known for her erotic novel Story of O (1954).

== Early life ==
Born in Rochefort, Charente-Maritime, France to a bilingual family, Desclos began reading in French and English at an early age. After completing her studies at the Sorbonne, she worked as a journalist until 1946 when she joined Gallimard Publishers as the editorial secretary for one of its imprints where she began using the pen name of Dominique Aury.

An lifelong reader of English literature, Desclos either translated or introduced to readers in France authors such as Algernon Charles Swinburne, Evelyn Waugh, Virginia Woolf, T. S. Eliot and F. Scott Fitzgerald. She became a critic and was made a member of the jury for several literary awards.

== Career ==
Desclos' lover and employer Jean Paulhan, who enjoyed the works of Marquis de Sade and had written a preface to one of his works, had made the remark to her that no woman was capable of writing an erotic novel. To prove him wrong, Desclos began a graphic, sadomasochistic novel; after reading the beginning, Paulhan encouraged her to complete it, and it was published under the pseudonym Pauline Réage in June 1954. Titled Histoire d'O (Story of O), with a sympathetic preface by Jean Paulhan which nevertheless did not reveal her identity, it was an enormous, though controversial, commercial success. The book caused much speculation as to the identity of the author. Many doubted that it was a woman, let alone the demure, intellectual, and almost prudish persona displayed in Dominique Aury's writings. Many well-known male writers were alternately suspected to be the author, including André Malraux and Henri de Montherlant.

In addition, the book's graphic content sparked so much controversy that the following March the government authorities brought obscenity charges against the publisher and its mysterious author that were thrown out of court in 1959. However, a publicity ban and a restriction on the book's sale to minors was imposed by the judge. Following the lifting of the publicity ban in 1967, the conclusion to Story of O was published under the title Retour à Roissy using the pseudonym of Pauline Réage. However, according to her recent biography by Angie David, Desclos did not write this second novel. In 1975, she did a long interview about erotic books with author Régine Deforges, published by Story of O editor Jean-Jacques Pauvert, yet at the time her authorship was still unknown. An English-language edition of the interview was released in the United States in 1979 by Viking Press.

Eventually, in a 1994 interview with The New Yorker, Desclos publicly admitted that she was the author of The Story of O, 40 years after the book was published. She also explained the pseudonym of Pauline Réage: she chose the first name in homage to Pauline Bonaparte and Pauline Roland and she randomly picked up the name of Réage on a topographic map.

== Documentaries ==
Writer of O, a 2004 documentary film by Pola Rapaport, mixed interviews with re-enactments of certain scenes from the book. In the documentary, the real author of Story of O, Dominique Aury (actually a pen name of Desclos), talks about the book A Girl in Love. This book was written about how Story of O was written.

A documentary was also made for BBC Radio 4 entitled The Story of O: The Vice Francaise, presented by Rowan Pelling, former editor of the Erotic Review, which looked at the history of the book and its author Desclos.

Erotica: A Journey Into Female Sexuality, a documentary by filmmaker Maya Gallus, featured the final interview with 90-year-old Dominique Aury (a pen name of Desclos) before she died. In the film, she recounts the extraordinary love story behind Story of O and marvels that she has reached such a grand age.

== Personal life ==
Desclos had a long-term relationship with her employer, Jean Paulhan, the director of the prestigious Nouvelle Revue Française, who was 23 years her senior. She was bisexual, and had a liaison with historian Édith Thomas, who may have been an inspiration for the character of Anne-Marie in Story of O. She had a son from a brief marriage in her early twenties.

== Legacy ==
In 2007, the National Leather Association International inaugurated awards for excellence in SM/fetish/leather writing. The categories include the Pauline Reage (a pen name of Desclos) award for fiction novel.

In 2020, Desclos was inducted into the Leather Hall of Fame.

== See also ==
- Chantons sous l'Occupation – a documentary film
