= 2026 Portugal wildfires =

- Part of Wildfires in 2026
- Date: July 2026

Statistics
- Status: Ongoing wildfire
- Perimeter: uncertain contained

Ignition
- Motive: Under investigation

Map
- Perimeters of 2026 Portugal wildfires (map data)

In July 2026, wildfires affected Portugal. The authorities were aided by the EU Civil Protection Mechanism.

== Background ==
The wildfires broke out amid the 2026 European heatwaves alongside other wildfires in France and Spain.

== Sernada do Préstimo ==
Wildfires at Sernada do Préstimo affected 13,000 hectares in northern Portugal.

== Valpaços ==
6,000 hectares have burned in the Valpaços area.

== Vouzela ==
Wildfires near Vouzela resulted in the European Union sending support. 1,200 firefighters, 400 vehicles and 15 aircraft were deployed.

== See also ==
- 2016 Portugal wildfires
- 2022 Portugal wildfires
- 2024 Portugal wildfires
- 2025 Portugal wildfires
- 2026 Spain wildfires, a concurrent wildfire season in Spain
- Climate change in Portugal
