= 2025 Portugal wildfires =

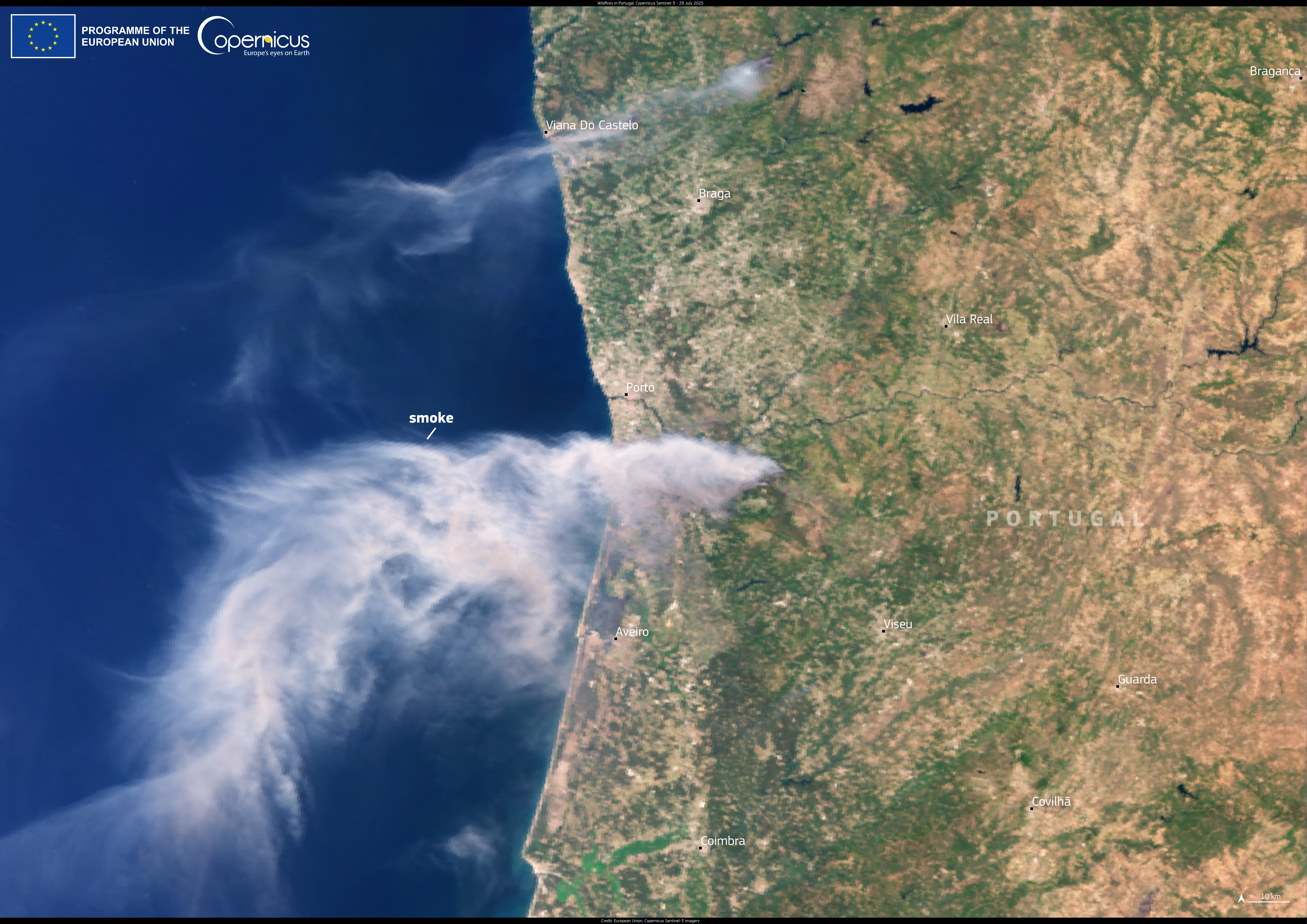
- This image, acquired by one of the Copernicus Sentinel-3 satellites on 29 July, shows the large smoke cloud generated by the wildfires in the Arouca area, along with a second plume of smoke rising from the Ponte de Barca wildfires
- Location: Central and Northern Portugal

Statistics
- Total area: 278,438 hectares (1075.05 square miles)

Impacts
- Deaths: 4

Ignition
- Cause: Exceptionally dry conditions, excessive heat, dry lightning, strong wind gusts, arson

The 2025 Portugal wildfires were a series of more than 33 significant wildfires that required a sustained or large response, burning more than 1075 square miles and involving more than 13,385 responders. The fires were caused by dry conditions, excessive heat, dry lightning, strong wind gusts, and arson and resulted in the deaths of at least 4 people. Researchers have found that recent wildfires in Portugal "have long-term ecological consequences, threatening biodiversity, increasing soil erosion and hindering ecosystem recovery" and have also increased hospitalizations, mortality rates, and have presented a danger to public health.

== Preparations ==
Every year, the Portuguese government issues a period for cleaning agricultural and forested areas as part of a wider fire prevention effort. In 2025, this period was extended from 31 May to 15 June.

Prime Minister Luís Montenegro stated on 31 July that Portugal had sufficient resources to handle the situation.

In early August, many monuments and forested areas in the Sintra and Lisbon areas were closed, including but not limited to: Monsanto Forest Park, Castle of the Moors, Pena Palace, and the Convent of the Capuchos (Sintra). As the fire situation continued, extensions to closures were made through at least 17 August.

By 12 August 2025, Público revealed that 40% of Portugal's forested areas had been cleared according to the National Action Plan (PNA).

== List of Fires ==
Below is a list of significant fires that required either a sustained response or large response due to location:

Location	Size (ha)	Start date	Conclusion Date	Notes	Reference(s)
Messejana (Nossa Senhora Da Assunção)	158	15 June	16 June	Over 140 responders at peak	
Almaceda and Padrâo	11	29 June	30 June	Up to 195 responders	
Chancelaria		29 June	29 June	Over 100 responders at peak	
Messejana (Monte Do Cerro)	1114	30 June	30 June	Over 250 responders at peak	
Benavente		27 July	27 July	Over 150 responders at peak	
Benavila E Valongo		27 July	27 July	Over 150 responders at peak	
Arouca	6555	28 July	2 August	Almost 800 responders at peak	
Ponte da Barca and Peneda-Gerês National Park (PNPG)	7224	26 July	4 August	Evacuation of Sobreda and 3 other villages. More than 700 responders at peak.	
Penamacor and Idanha-a-Nova	3467	28 July	30 July	More than 400 responders at peak activations; multiple reignitions	
Penafiel		29 July	1 August	250 responders, multiple reactivations	
Mem Martins	5	30 July	30 July	Residential area	
Trancoso	31819	2 August	17 August	More than 700 responders at peak	
Vila Real, Pena Quinta e Vila Cova, Sirarelhos	6048	2 August	13 August	Multiple reactivations, almost 700 responders at peak	
São Cibrão	1101	2 August	3 August	Over 300 responders at peak	
Ribeira de Pena	1430	8 August	12 August	300 responders at peak activation	
Tabuaço		10 August	17 August	Over 300 responders at peak, multiple reactivations	
Covilhã	1022	10 August	12 August	More than 550 responders active at peak	
Santiago do Cacém	306	12 August	13 August	Over 350 responders	
Cinfães	700	13 August	15 August	Over 150 responders, multiple reignitions	
Sátão	5173	13 August	17 August	Over 1000 responders	
Piódão	64721	13 August	24 August	Evacuations of Foz d'Égua and Chãs d'Égua; over 1600 responders; caused by dry thunderstorm	
Lousã	5154	14 August	18 August	Over 500 responders	
Portalegre and Castelo de Vide	1400	14 August	15 August	Over 300 responders, multiple reactivations	
Ribeira De Nisa E Carreiras		14 August	15 August	Over 300 responders	
Pêra Do Moço		15 August	17 August	Over 200 responders	
Freixo de Espada à Cinta	13473	15 August	18 August	Over 200 responders	
Figueiró Dos Vinhos	27	15 August	15 August	Almost 200 responders	
Sabugal	27387	15 August	21 August	Over 400 responders	
Tarouca		16 August	18 August	Over 250 responders	
Vila Real, Mondim de Basto, Campanhó, and Paradança		16 August	17 August	Over 200 responders	
Mirandela		17 August	20 August	Nearly 350 responders	
Montalegre		18 August	20 August	Over 500 responders	
Pedrógão Grande		23 August	24 August	Residential area; over 900 responders at peak	

== Impact ==
By 31 July, the total burned area of all fires reached 30,000 ha (74,000 acres). By August 5, the size of the total area impacted increased to 42,000 ha (100,000 acres).

On 1 August, it was reported that 19 people had been injured by wildfires in three districts which prompted the evacuation of two villages and the deployment of over 1,800 firefighters. The most severe fires were in the districts of Aveiro, Porto and Viana do Castelo, which were being fought by 441, 231 and 622 firefighters respectively; the latter, which began on 26 July in the Peneda-Gerês National Park (PNPG), led to the evacuation of at least 60 people. The PNPG fire concluded on 4 August after burning 7,550 ha (18,700 acres), of which 5,786 ha (14,300 acres) were in the park itself.

As of 13 August, a total area of 63,000 ha (160,000 acres) had been burned. According to the European Forest Fire Information System (EFFIS), more than 15 August, this area increased to 78,000 ha (190,000 acres). The area nearly doubled by the next day, to approximately 140,000 ha (350,000 acres) according to the Institute for Nature Conservation and Forests (ICNF).

On 15 August, the first mortality was reported in Vila Franca do Deão. While responding to a fire, a vehicle carrying a group of firefighters crashed resulting in the death of one and the injury of four others outside of São Francisco de Assis, Covilhã.

Nationally, conditions began to improve on 17 August. More than 200,000 ha (490,000 acres), or 2.3% of the total national area, had burned.

== Response ==
On 29 July, the Portuguese government requested satellite assistance through the Copernicus Programme, for use of its Emergency Management Service with regard to the Arouca fire. This allowed for additional imagery and support to assist ground teams.

On 31 July, a Canadair plane crashed into one of the banks of the Douro River while assisting in firefighting efforts in Penafiel and Gondomar.

By 11 August, two more Canadair planes went out of service due to mechanical failures. Portugal requested assistance from Spain, but were denied due to Spanish resources being overwhelmed. Morocco agreed to send two planes to assist the Portuguese efforts. Both Canadair planes were replaced by Avancis by 14 August.

On August 12, the mayor of Vila Real spoke about the national response to the fires in the area, criticising Montenegro's prior statements that the country was prepared and that sufficient resources were available.

On both 9 and 12 August, the National Emergency and Civil Protection Authority (ANEPC) sent an emergency text warning residents of the maximum fire alert level and to not use machinery or fire in rural or forested areas.

Causes of the fires varies but many were suspected to be arson. At least 42 people were arrested In flagrante delicto while more than 550 people were suspected.

The Portuguese government activated the European Union Civil Protection Mechanism (UCPM) on 15 August, the same day the first mortality was reported in Vila Franca do Deão. Sweden committed to sending two planes and Malta committed to sending firefighting teams to the country. Additionally, the Portuguese government also announced that the Portuguese Army would increase firefighting reinforcements with an additional 60 personnel. More than 3000 had already been made available since the beginning of the season.

== See also ==
- 2025 European and Mediterranean wildfires
- 2025 European heatwaves
- 2024 Portugal wildfires
- June 2017 Portugal wildfires
- 2016 Portugal wildfires
- List of wildfires
- Wildfires in 2025
