= 2026 Italy wildfires =

Series of fires in Italy

- Part of Wildfires in 2026
- Date: July 2026

Statistics
- Status: Ongoing wildfire
- Perimeter: uncertain contained
- Total area: 36,600 ha (90,441 acres) (as of 22 July)

Impacts
- Deaths: 1

Ignition
- Motive: Under investigation; arson confirmed in some Calabria incidents

Map
- Perimeters of 2026 Italy wildfires (map data)

In 2026, wildfires affected multiple regions of Italy, including Sicily, Sardinia, Calabria, Tuscany, and Piedmont.

== Background ==
The wildfires broke out amid the 2026 European heatwaves alongside other wildfires in France and Spain.

== Timeline by region ==
=== Apulia ===
On 26 July 2026, a major wildfire swept across the Gargano peninsula on the Adriatic coast, forcing the evacuation of hundreds of tourists and residents. The fires were started by arsonists.

=== Calabria ===
On 22 July 2026, more than 160 fires were recorded in Calabria, including one at Pollino National Park; the head of local civil protection described them as deliberate arson, with perpetrators tying rags soaked in flammable liquid to the tails of stray cats to spread the fires.

=== Molise ===
On 26 July 2026, Molise, in an area bordering Apulia, was affected by a large fire that spread from Gargano, Apulia. The fires were started by arsonists.

=== Piedmont ===
On 8 July, unusually high temperatures were recorded in the Alps in Piedmont, with Domodossola reaching 39 °C (102 °F) and Ala di Stura, at an elevation of 1,000 metres, reaching 33.5 °C (92.3 °F); downslope winds contributed to wildfire activity reaching alpine areas where fires have traditionally been rare.

=== Sardinia ===
On 13 July, a fire broke out near Aglientu in the Gallura region of Sardinia, destroying approximately 20 hectares of coastal pine forest at Monti Russu; the fire department attributed the blaze to lightning strikes during preceding thunderstorms. Beaches were cleared and a provincial road between Castelsardo and Santa Teresa Gallura was closed for several hours.

=== Sicily ===
In July, wildfires broke out on the island of Sicily. Multiple areas of the island were affected. Between 15 and 21 July, Sicily recorded a particularly severe week in which 16,834 hectares burned. The most serious wildfires were those in Enna and Modica.

On 22 July 2026, a large wildfire reached the town of Santo Stefano Quisquina in Agrigento province.

A firefighter died in Sicily after falling ill while battling the flames, according to Italian Interior Minister Matteo Piantedosi.

By 23 July, firefighters said they had engaged on 1,000 occasions, with around 6,000 firefighters, forest guards and civil protection officials deployed across Sicily despite the use of water-bombing aircraft.

On 28 July, the Sicilian regional government approved an initial €25 million relief package in response to the wildfires.

=== Tuscany ===
In May 2026, wildfires spread in Tuscany.

== Impact ==
According to Greenpeace, the cumulative area burned nationally between 1 January and 22 July reached 36,600 hectares, compared with a historical mean of 20,329 hectares for the same period, an increase of roughly 80 percent. Separately, the environmental group Legambiente recorded 469 fires between 1 January and 15 June, burning 9,545 hectares, an increase of 36.3 percent year-on-year. Sicily alone accounted for more than 24,000 hectares burned through 21 July. Sicily, Calabria and Campania together represented an estimated 71 percent of all forest area burned nationally in 2026. At the provincial level, Agrigento (1,677 hectares) and Trapani (1,618 hectares) recorded the largest burned areas.

== Response ==
Italy sent 14 emergency personnel and two Canadair CL-415 water bombers to assist Spain's own wildfire response under the EU's rescEU civil protection mechanism by 26 July, even as domestic firefighting efforts continued.

== Reactions ==
Green politician Angelo Bonelli criticised Environment Minister Gilberto Pichetto Fratin and Civil Protection Minister Nello Musumeci over the government's wildfire prevention efforts, stating: "Italy has dismantled prevention and now it burns."

== Aftermath ==
=== Causes ===
All the fires were started deliberately by arsonists, some were detected by surveillance drones and were arrested.

== See also ==
- Climate change in Italy
- 2021 Italy wildfires
- 2026 France wildfires
- 2026 Spain wildfires
