= 2026 France wildfires =

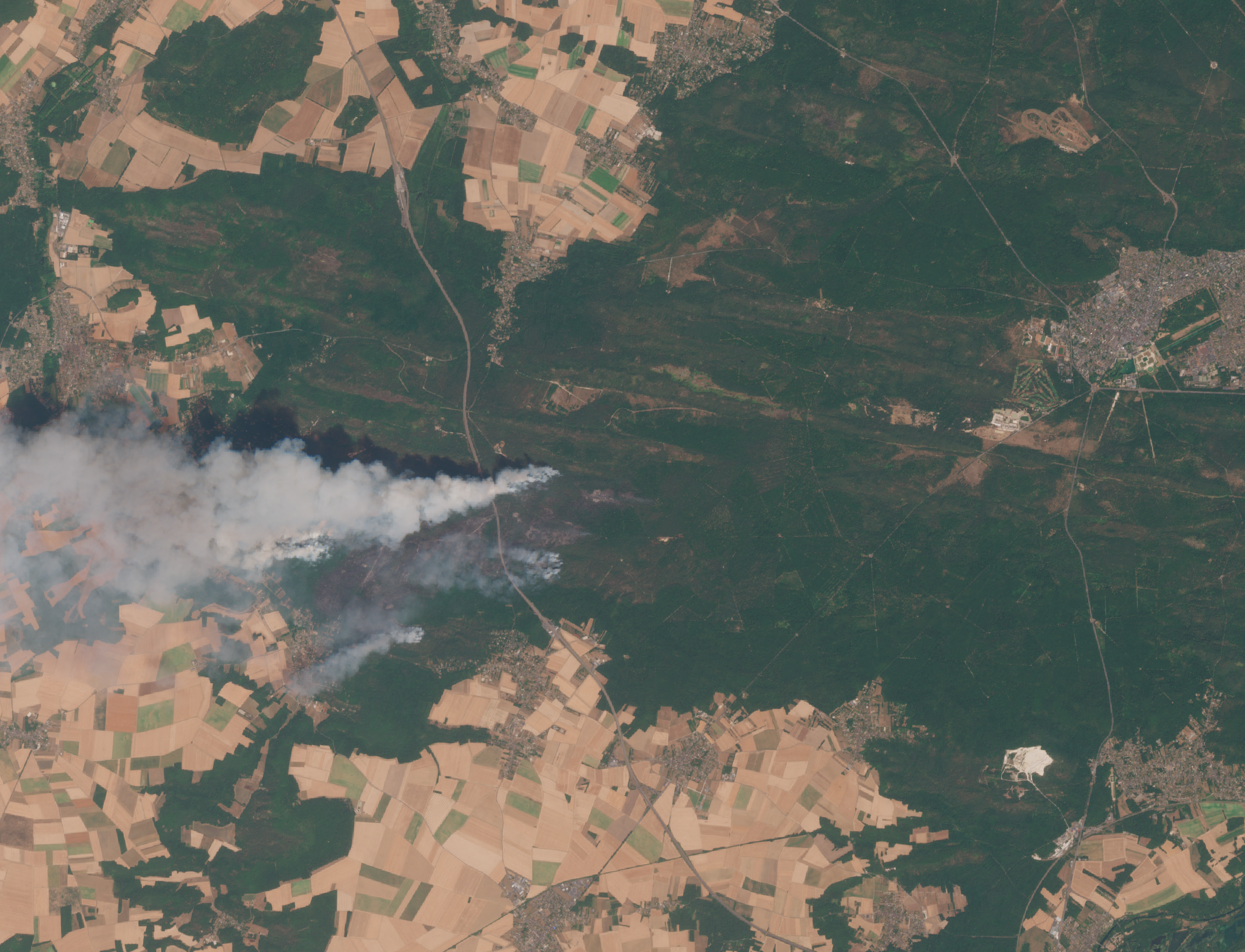
- Wildfire at the Forest of Fontainebleau
- Date: 2026

Statistics
- Total area: 115,000 ha (280,000 acres)

Impacts
- Deaths: 0
- Evacuated: 200,000
- Structures destroyed: 240

Map
- Perimeters of 2026 France wildfire (map data)

In 2026, wildfires affected France, particularly in the north and south of the country, burning 115,000 ha (280,000 acres). The wildfire season is classified as the worst in the country since 1949. As of Sep 23, 2026, over 108,000 hectares have been burnt, over 2.8 times the average.

== Background ==
France was affected by the 2026 European heatwaves, which contributed to a severe wildfire season. On 23 June, the European Union recorded the hottest day since measurements began in 1947, and emergency services and military forces were placed on wildfire alert.

Prime Minister Sébastien Lecornu stated that climate change had caused the wildfire season to come earlier. Several climate scientists linked the severity of the heatwaves to global heating, while UN Climate Change Executive Secretary Simon Stiell said the heatwave "has the fingerprints of the climate crisis all over it".

The heatwaves are thought to have been in part caused by the El Niño that developed in 2026.

== Timeline ==
On 2 July, a large wildfire in Aude and Hérault, saw 800 firefighters and 150 vehicles deployed. Three thousand people were evacuated.

On 5 July 70 residents of Bezouce were evacuated while 10,000 people were evacuated due to wildfires near the Spanish border. Over 11,000 acres was burned.

Water-bombing helicopter tackling a forest fire near Nantua and Les Neyrolles on 8 July 2026.

By 13 July 23 wildfires were burning across the country, with 916 reported over the last 30 days. On 13 July, firefighters tackled a large blaze at Fontainebleau forest. Nine-hundred homes were evacuated. The fires were fuelled by strong winds. Evacuations of people were carried out. Water from the River Seine was used to help the efforts.

On 22 July, it was released that between 17 June and 2 July there were 5,764 more deaths than usual which was thought to be a result of the heatwaves. This illustrates the unprecedented level of heat which contributed to dryness. The UN released that "Europe also saw widespread dryness that, together with extreme heat, contributed to wildfire activity, particularly in the Iberian Peninsula and southern France".

On 23 July, over 20,000 people were evacuated to escape wildfires near Bordeaux. Evacuations were declared in the Gironde department, with authorities ordering a complete evacuation of around 40,000 people from the Cap Ferret peninsula. By 24 July, France requested the activation of the European Union Civil Protection Mechanism (UCPM). This will include two Croatian Canadair water bombers, two Portuguese Air Tractor aircraft and two heavy Black Hawk helicopters from the Czech Republic and Slovakia. Around 250,000 people were evacuated in the Gironde and Landes departments. The Gironde wildfire is the largest wildfires in France since the 1949 Landes forest fire

On 26 July, French Interior Minister Laurent Nuñez told France 24 that "France is currently battling 30 to 40 wildfires daily", it was also announced that over 115,000 hectares had been burnt. Furthermore, the fire was near Bordeaux, with fires in nearby coastal towns such as Le Porge. Nuñez described the situation as "unfavourable".

On 27 July, the mayor of Marcheprime in Gironde said that the situation was reassuring due to rain overnight, he added that the town should be vigilant of winds. It was reported that the fire was 15 km (9.3 mi) away from Bordeaux.

== Notable fires ==
=== Gironde ===
Perimeter of 2026 Gironde wildfire (map data)

By 25 July, the Gironde Wildfire, had burnt close to 20,000 ha (49,000 acres) and was near Bordeaux. On the 27 July, BBC News said that the fire had burnt more than 42,000 hectares.

The fire began to generate its own weather, with pyrocumulonimbus ("fire thunderstorm") effects creating lightning and starting additional fires. This is an extremely rare event, frequent in North America and Australia, but never before seen in France.

=== Landes ===
The Biscarrosse (or Landes) wildfire burnt through more than 3,500 ha (8,600 acres) and more than 30,000 people were evacuated.

=== Fontainebleau ===
The Fontainebleau forest fires burnt through more than 2,000 ha (4,900 acres) and came near the capital Paris.

Gros Bessillon, Var

The Gros Bessillon fire burnt through 6,300 ha (15,500 acres) spanning across 22 days, with 70 homes impacted of which 42 totally burned down.

== Government responses ==
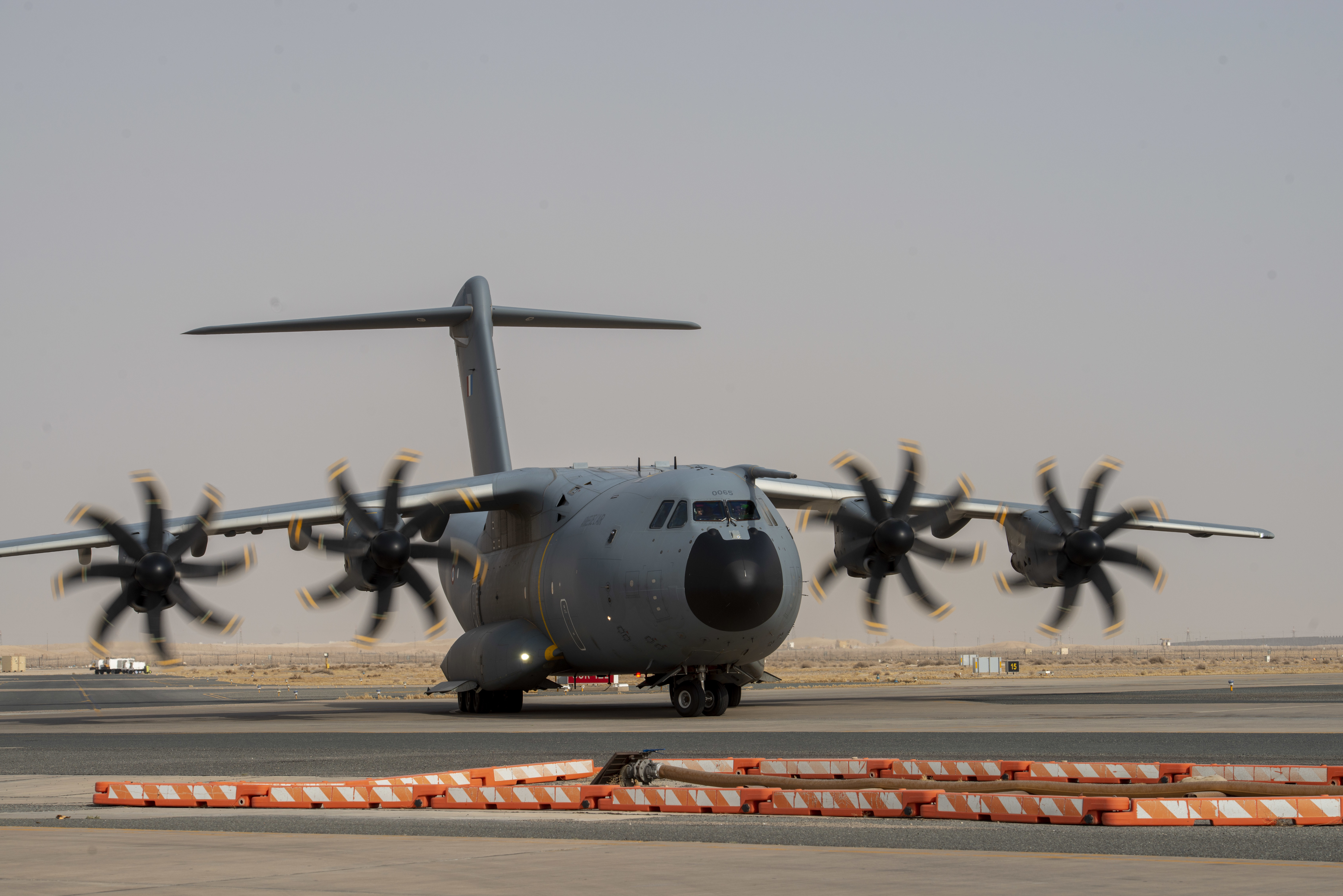
The Airbus A400M Atlas is also a military transport plane.

On 23 July 2026, the French Government announced that it would use the Airbus A400M Atlas military aircraft as a large air tanker (with the Airbus firefighting kit) with up to 20 tonnes of fire retardant inside it. The French military said that the certifications of the crews for the new system began on 20 July. In an interview with BFM TV, Government Spokesperson Maud Bregeon said the plane would be ready by the end of July. The technology that the French Government will use for this was first tested by Airbus in 2025. Airbus says that the system is a Roll on Roll off system which is controlled by the rear ramp of the plane. The system requires water/retardant to be pumped into the aircraft at an airport or base. Since 25 July, the A400M Atlas has been in use in trying to slow or stop the fire near Bordeaux.

== International support ==
France activated the European Union Civil Protection Mechanism to request international assistance. Several countries deployed firefighting resources, including Romania, which had a pre-positioned ground firefighting contingent in southern France, while Croatia, the Czech Republic, Germany, Portugal, Slovakia, Sweden, and Turkey sent firefighting aircraft or helicopters.

== Gallery ==
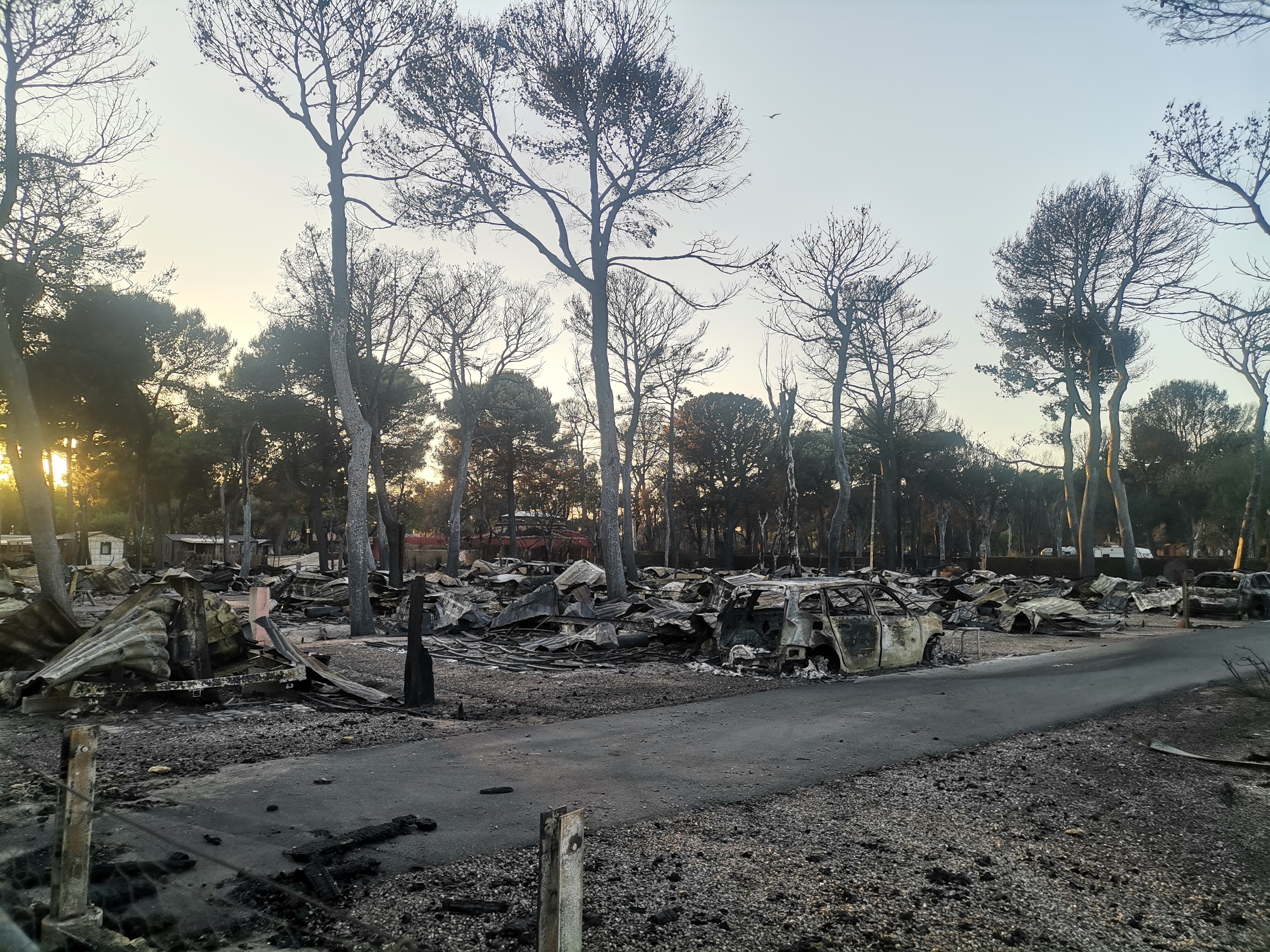
4 July 2026: Le Brasilia in Canet-en-Roussillon after the fire of July 2, 2026

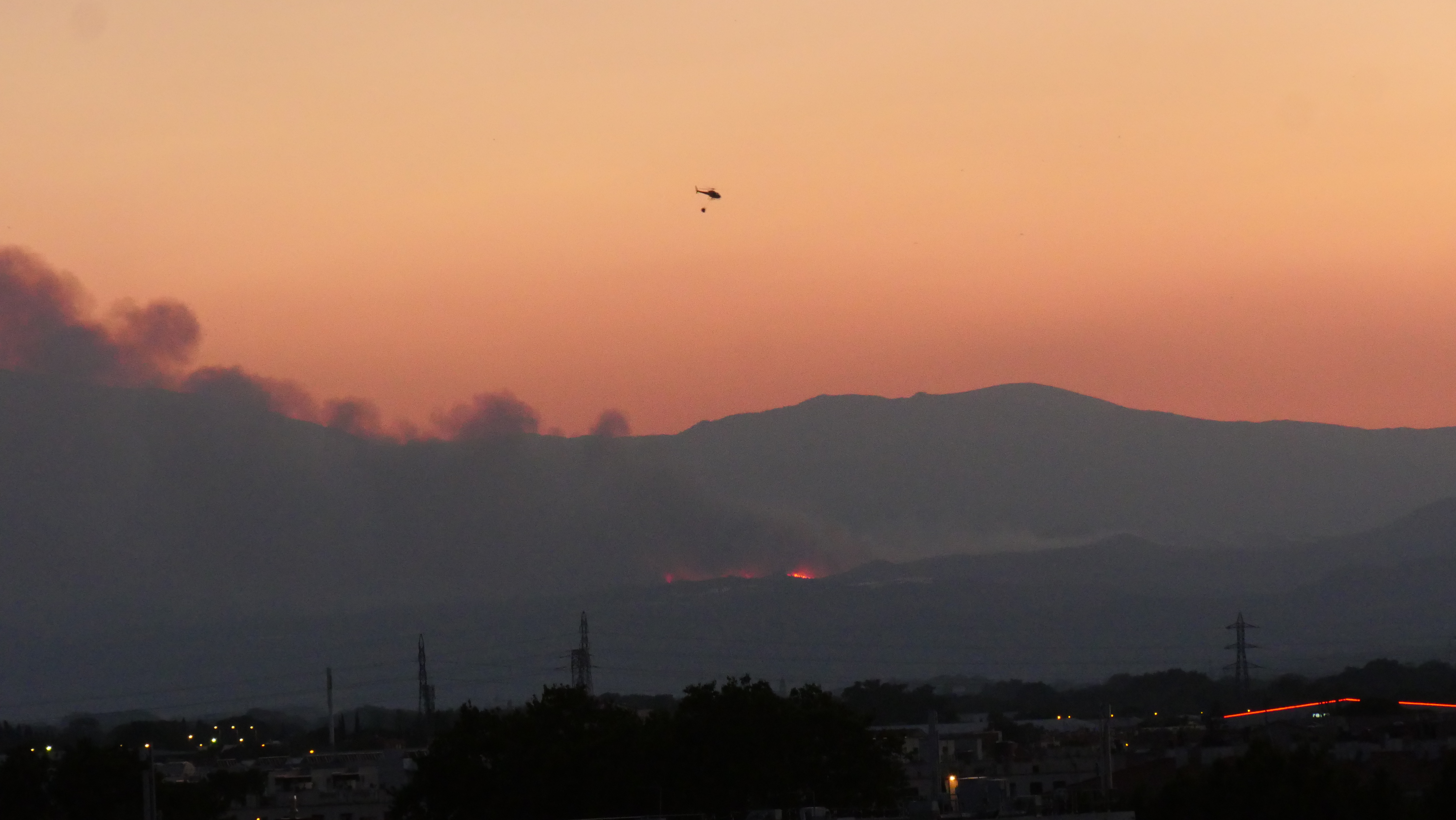
Trévillach fire on 4 July 2026.

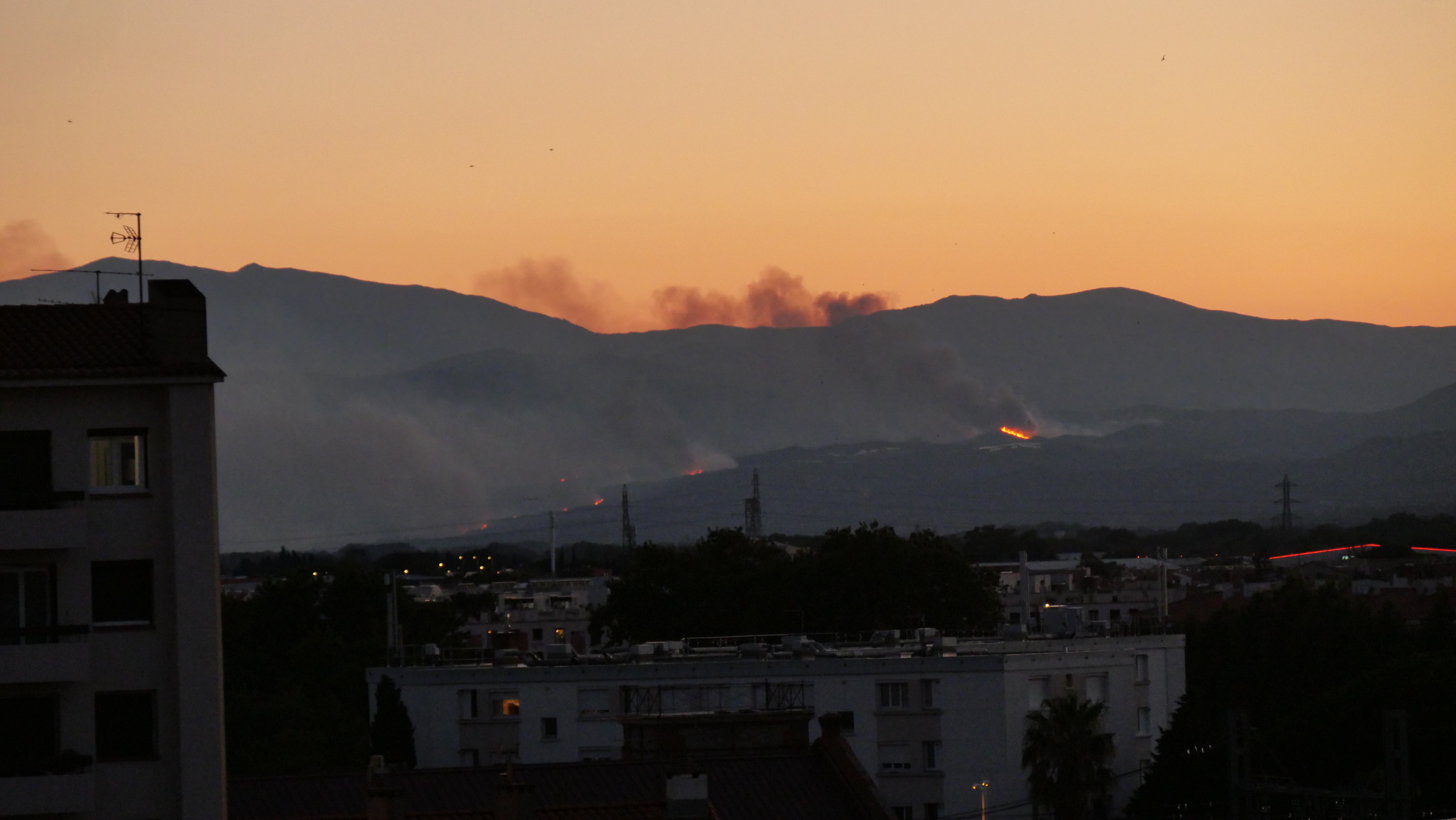
Trévillach fire on 5 July 2026.

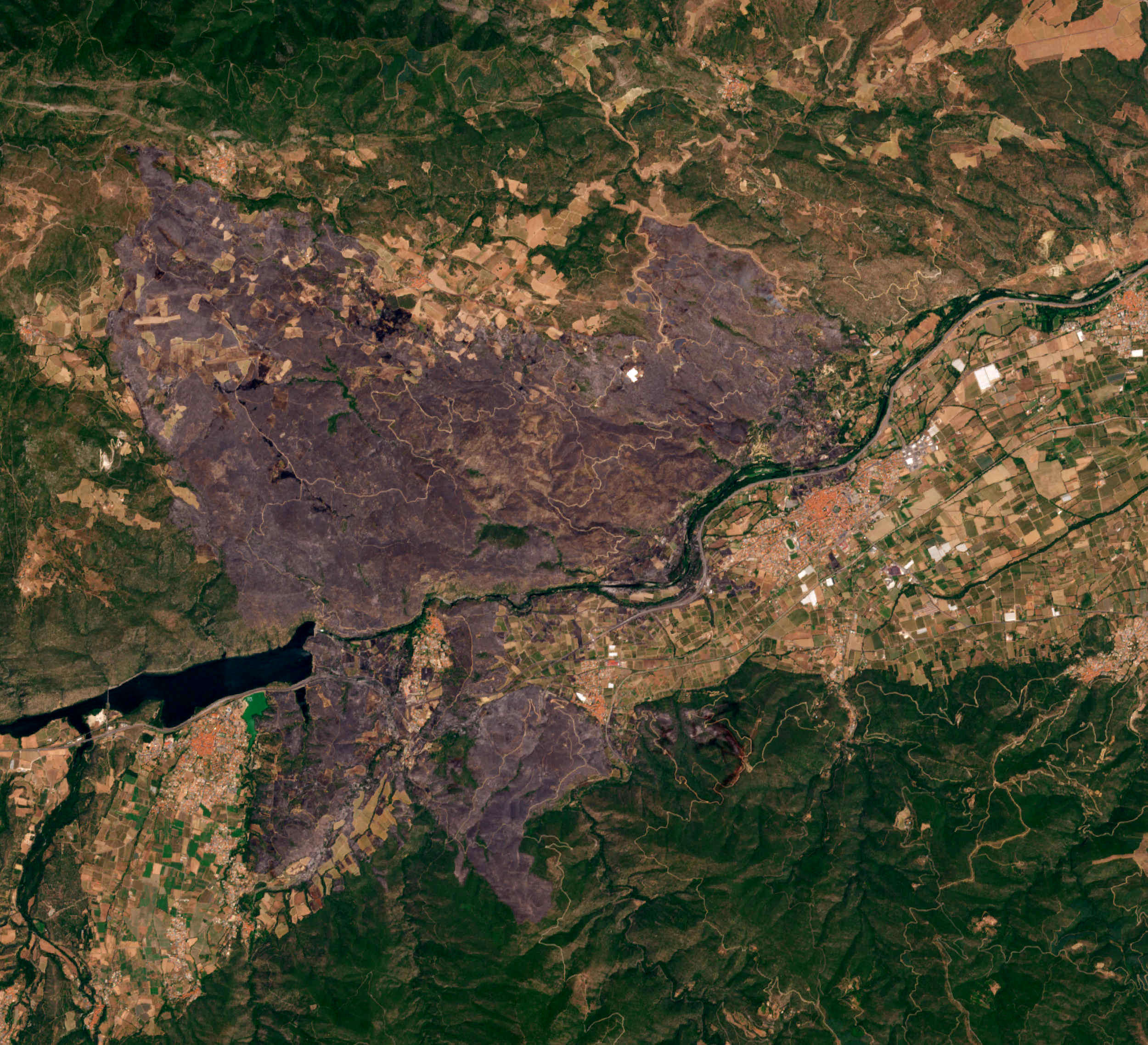
Trévillach fire on 7 July 2026.

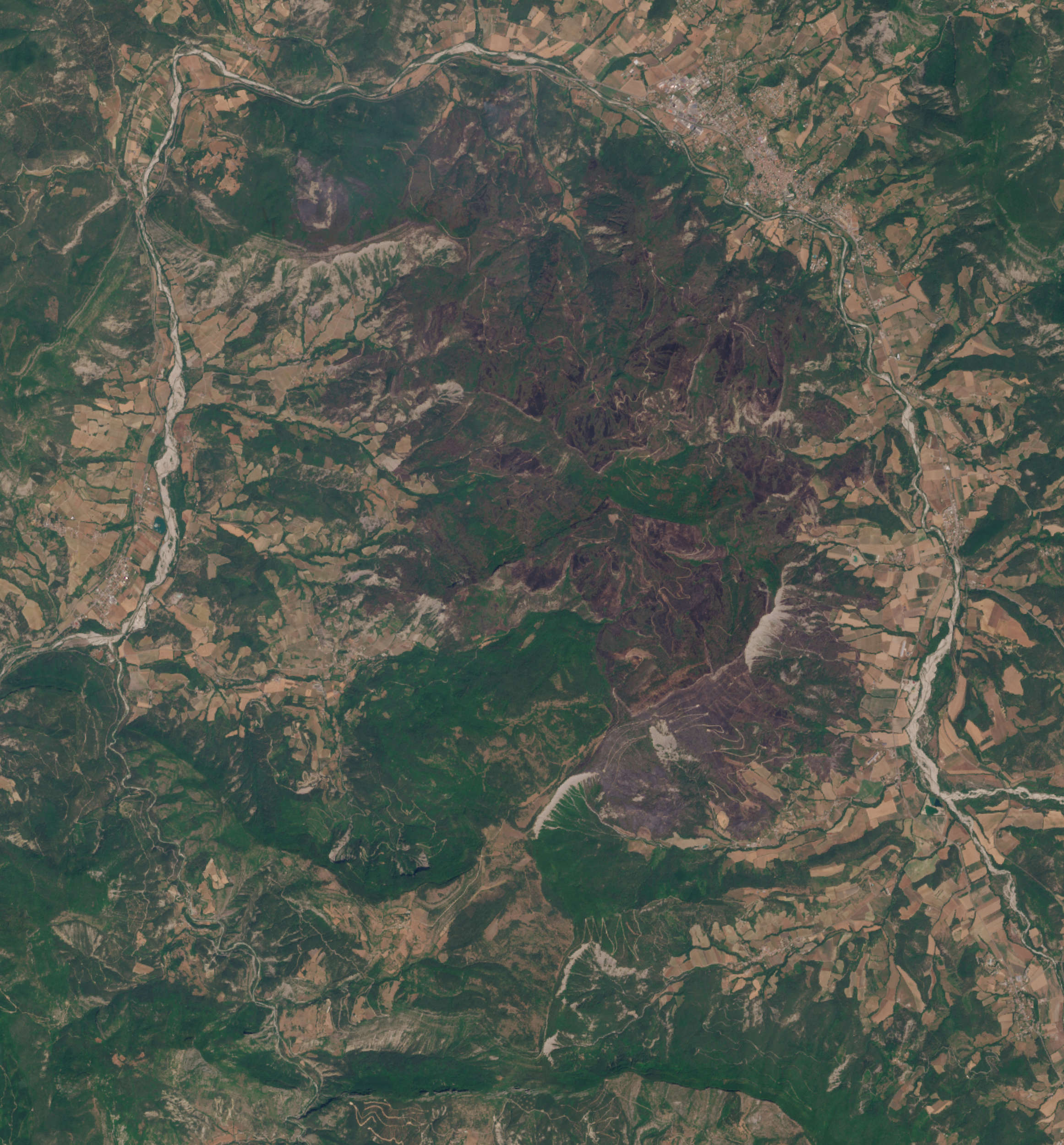
Die (Drôme) on 12 July 2026.

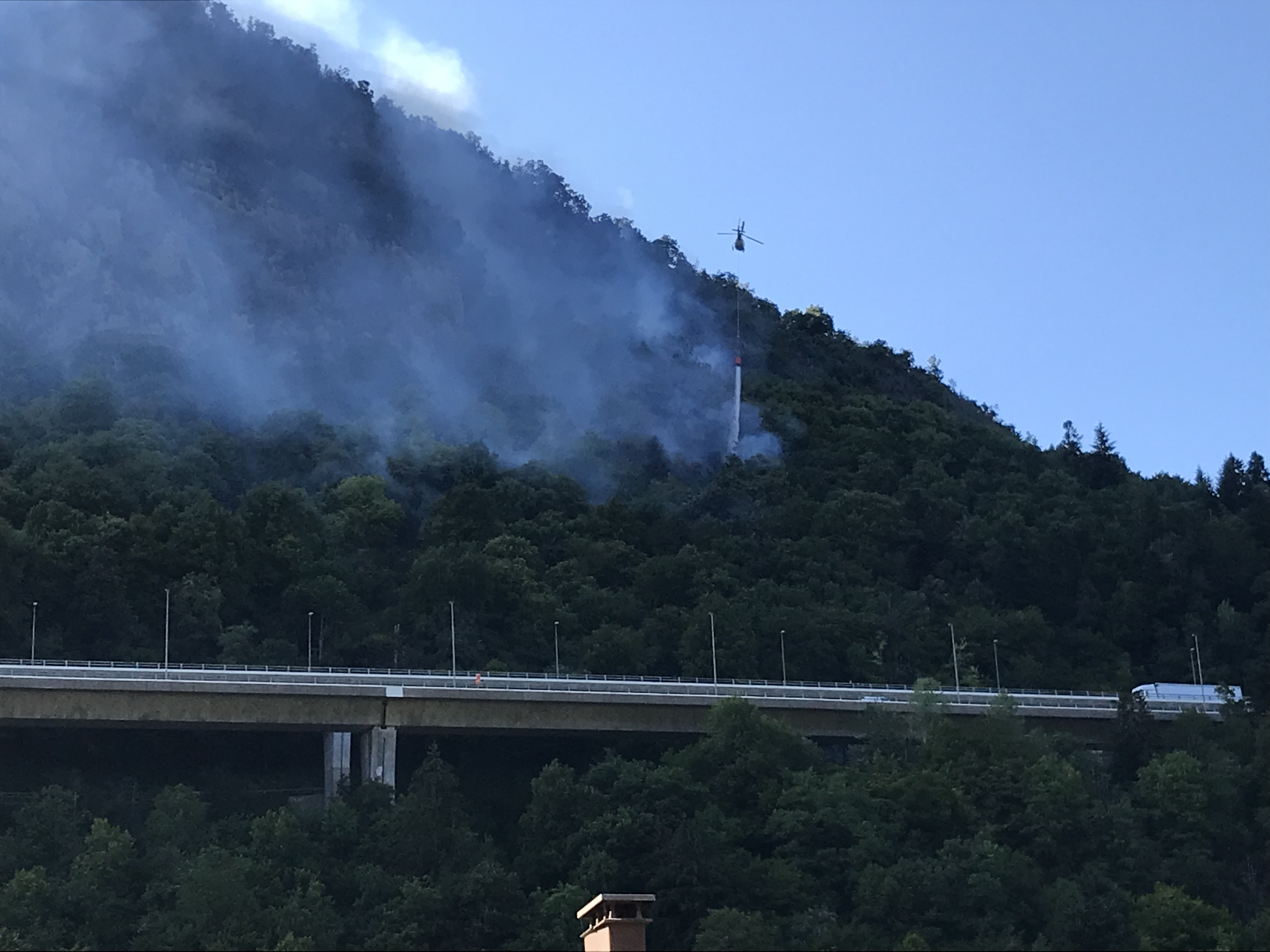
8 July 2026: A water bomber helicopter attempting to extinguish the forest fire that started on July 7, 2026, between Nantua and Les Neyrolles (Ain).

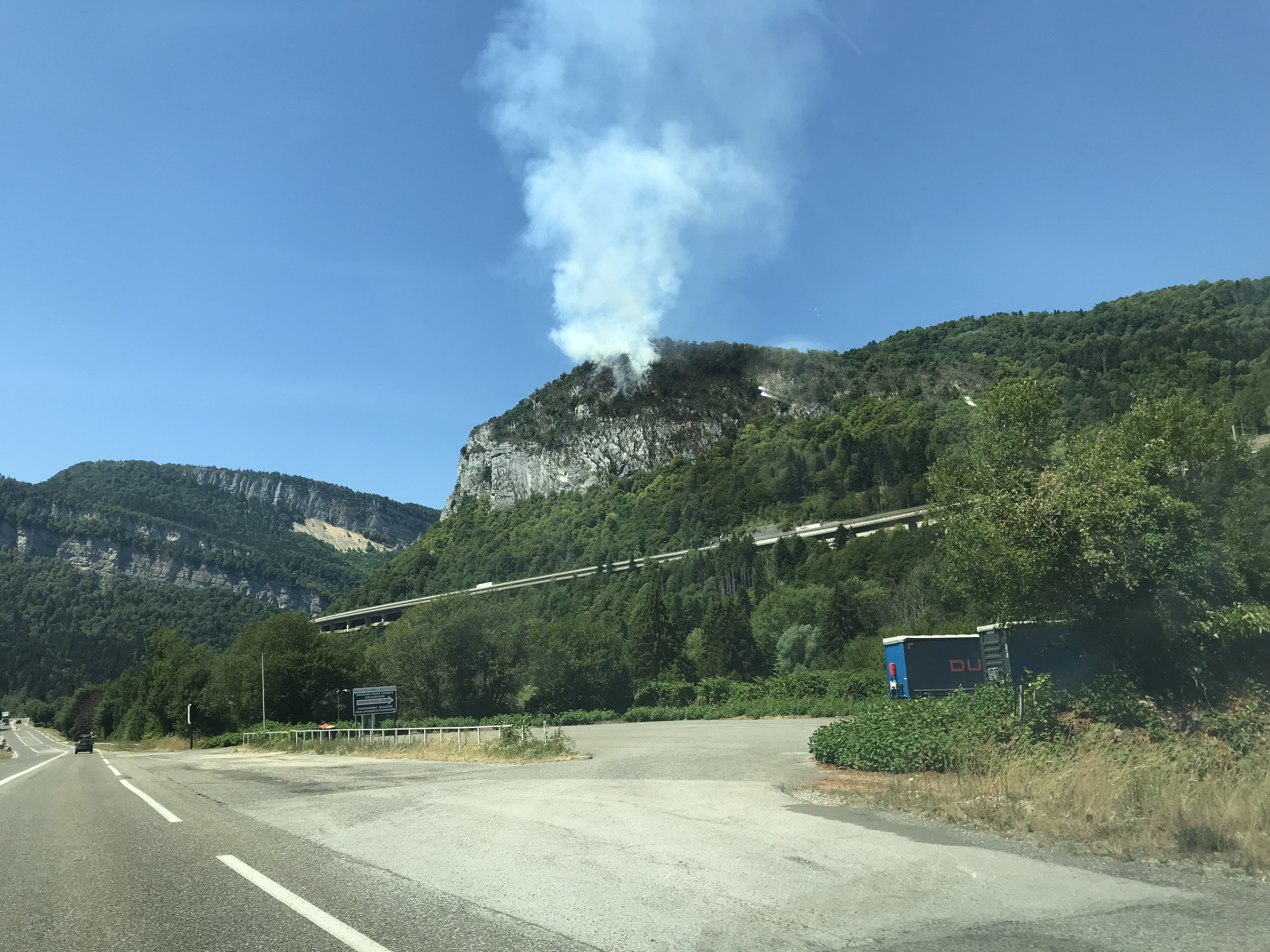
Nantua and Les Neyrolles.

== See also ==
- 2026 Greece wildfires
- 2026 Italy wildfires
- 2026 Portugal wildfires
- 2026 Spain wildfires
- 2026 United Kingdom wildfires
