= 2026 Crans-Montana bar fire =

Deadly nightclub fire in Switzerland

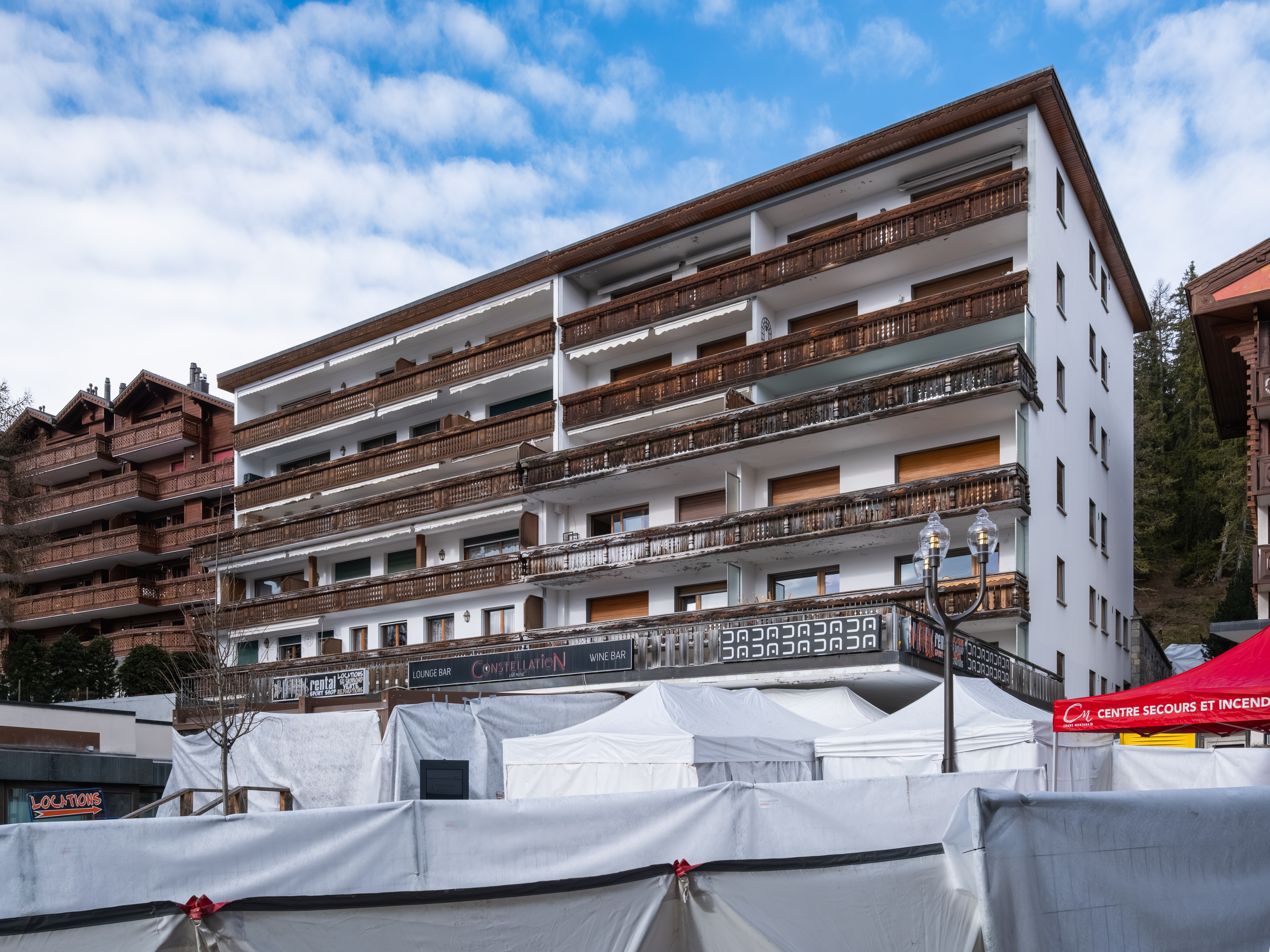
- Le Constellation in Crans-Montana on 2 January 2026, the day after the fire
- Date: 1 January 2026 (10 months ago)
- Time: 01:26 (CET; UTC+1)
- Venue: Le Constellation
- Location: Crans-Montana, Valais, Switzerland; 46°18′29″N 7°28′07″E
- Cause: Under investigation, but likely ignition of acoustic foam by interior pyrotechnics
- Deaths: 41
- Injuries: 115

On 1 January 2026 at 01:26 (CET), during New Year celebrations, a fire broke out at Le Constellation bar in the ski-resort town of Crans-Montana, Valais, Switzerland. Forty-one people died in the fire, and 115 others were injured, with 83 initially being treated for severe burns. Intensive care units in Valais reached capacity, and victims were transported to hospitals in other parts of Switzerland and to other European countries. A national day of mourning was observed on 9 January 2026 in memory of the victims.

Swiss authorities consider it likely that the ceiling caught fire after lit sparklers or more specifically gerbs attached to champagne bottles were held aloft in celebration. A criminal investigation was opened against the bar's owners.

== Background ==
=== Bar ===
A year-round bar, nightclub, and café in Crans-Montana, Le Constellation could accommodate 300 people on two levels—a ground floor and a basement—plus 40 on the terrace. The basement bar had a shisha and smoking area, and TV screens for viewing sports events.

It had a mostly younger clientele, because it had no entrance fee, and primarily served locals, rather than tourists. Swiss media reported that bar guests had complained on ratings platforms about poor treatment of personnel and a lack of professionalism.

=== Owners ===
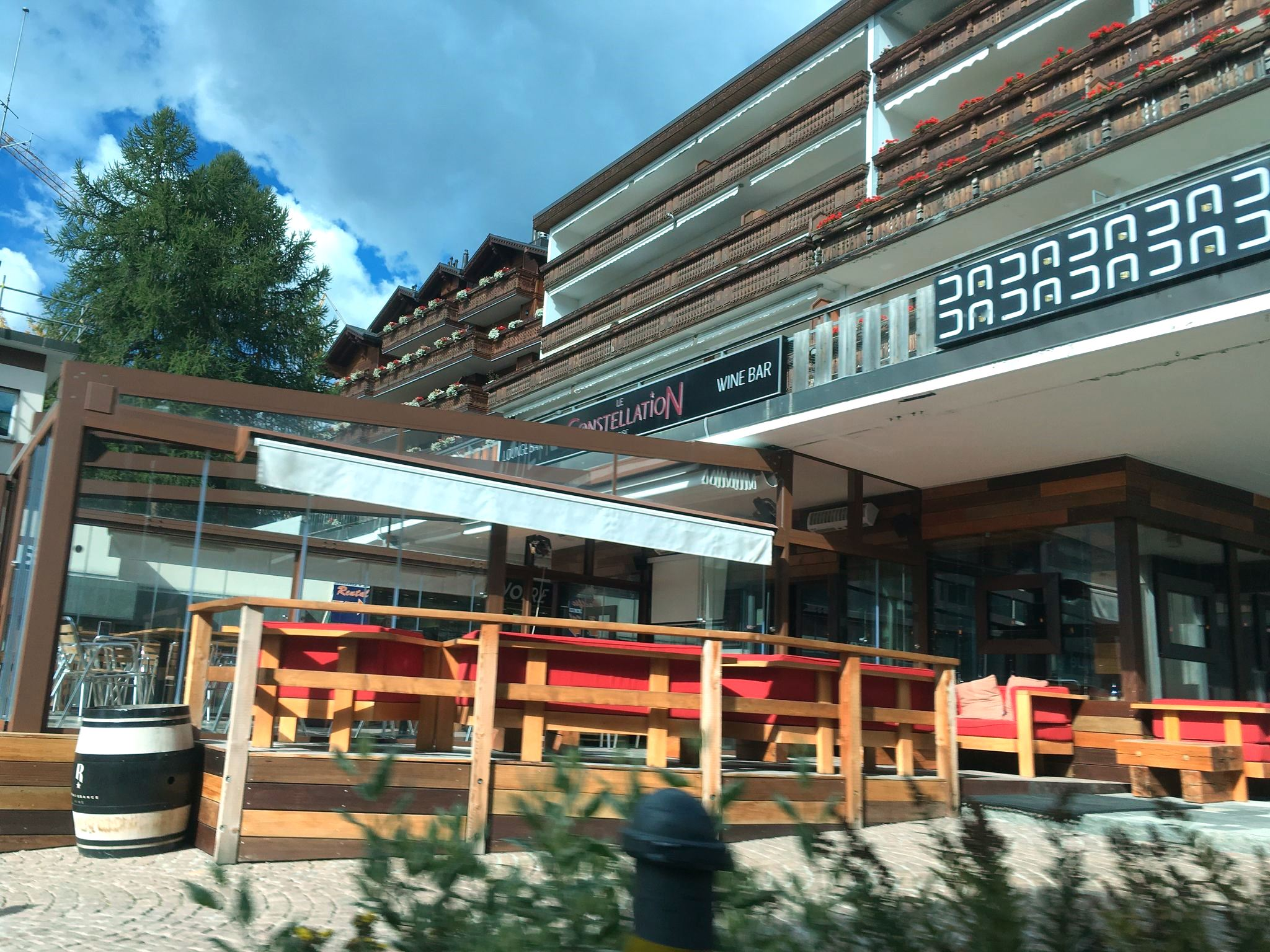
Le Constellation in 2017

The bar was acquired and remodelled in 2015 by Jacques and Jessica Moretti, a married French couple from Corsica who own several establishments in the region. They were economically successful, driving expensive Maserati, Bentley, and Porsche cars. They were investigated in 2020 on the suspicion of the misuse of COVID-19 relief funds, but charges were dropped when they could prove that the Maserati they bought shortly after obtaining the funds was on the books of their bar.

French media reported that Jacques Moretti was previously, in France, involved in various offences relating to prostitution, kidnapping and unlawful detention. In 2005, he served two years in prison for fraud, and in 2008, he was sentenced to twelve months' imprisonment for "aggravated pimping". Valaisan law requires that the licence needed to operate a bar shall be granted only to those who "have not been convicted of any offence that could pose a risk to the operation of accommodation and catering services".

== Fire ==
Police said that more than 100 people were inside the bar when the fire began, though the exact number was not known at the time. A photo obtained by French media shows a waitress wearing a crash helmet and holding up two bottles of champagne adorned with lit "fountain candle" sparklers (more specifically lit gerbs), who was being carried on the shoulders of a barman wearing a Guy Fawkes mask. The sparks were centimetres from the ceiling, which then caught fire. Immediate attempts to extinguish it by hitting the ceiling with an item of clothing failed.

The moment a sparkler (or gerb) ignited the ceiling's foam cladding

Within seconds of the fire's start, people in the queue to enter saw smoke billowing out; ten seconds later, "an immense fire blast" occurred. The ceiling appeared to be clad in acoustic foam, which several fire experts noted could have contributed to the fire's rapid spread if the foam panels were not flame-retardant. Such materials can also produce dense and toxic smoke. Officials reported the fire rapidly progressed into a flashover, a phenomenon where nearly all combustible materials in an enclosed space simultaneously ignite, engulfing the area in flames.

People in the basement nightclub attempted to escape up a narrow flight of stairs and through a small door. The speed of the fire's spread prevented people from reaching the emergency exits, leading to a blockage at the main one. Survivors' statements and local accounts led to uncertainty over whether the basement emergency exit was accessible during the fire. Some resorted to smashing windows, while one bystander who rushed in to help said that he saw people "burning from head to foot, no clothes any more". Many victims were so severely burned they were no longer recognisable.

The Valais cantonal police said that authorities were first alerted at 01:30 CET because of smoke emerging from the bar. Police arrived at 01:32, and firefighters arrived at the scene immediately thereafter. In total, 150 personnel, 10 helicopters and 40 ambulances were deployed to the scene. Police cordoned off the disaster area and imposed a no-fly zone over the town, and the Valais cantonal government declared a state of emergency. Triage centres were set up in neighbouring bars and a UBS branch.

== Victims ==
Casualties by citizenship
Citizenship	Dead	Injured
Switzerland	22 (Note: Including: 1 dual Swiss-Serbian citizen)	68 (Note: Including: 1 dual Swiss-Belgian citizen)
France	9 (Note: Including: 1 dual French-Swiss citizen; 1 triple French-Israeli-British citizen)	23 (Note: Including: 1 dual French-Finnish citizen; 1 dual French-Italian citizen)
Italy	6	10
Belgium	1	1
Portugal	1	1
Romania	1	—N/a
Turkey	1	—N/a
Serbia	—N/a	4
Poland	—N/a	2
Bosnia and Herzegovina	—N/a	1
Czech Republic	—N/a	1
Luxembourg	—N/a	1
Philippines	—N/a	1 (Note: A dual Filipino-Italian citizen)
Australia	—N/a	1
Republic of the Congo	—N/a	1
Total	41	115

A day after the fire, Swiss authorities confirmed that 40 people had died and 115 others were injured. The total number of injured was later revised to 116. The death toll increased to 41 following the death of a Swiss national on 31 January. Several of the victims were foreign tourists. Eighty-three of the injured suffered severe burns, in some cases affecting over 60 per cent of their bodies. The majority of the victims were young. The ages of the dead ranged from 14 years to 39, with half under the age of 18. The Italian Air Force repatriated the remains of several victims from Sion Airport.

A reception centre and specialised hotline were established to provide support for affected families. Air ambulances transported injured persons to hospitals in Sion and Geneva; at least 22 and 12 victims, respectively, were transferred to the national burn centres in Lausanne and Zurich. The intensive care units in Valais reached full capacity, causing patients to be transported to other hospitals around the country. Hospitals throughout Romandy were overwhelmed with burn patients, most of whom were in severe condition.

Overview map from the Emergency Response Coordination Centre from the European Union's Civil Protection Mechanism

Switzerland requested emergency assistance through the European Union's Civil Protection Mechanism. Twenty-four patients were transported to hospitals in Belgium, France, Germany, Italy, and Poland. In Italy, a burn unit was opened at the Ospedale Niguarda Ca' Granda in Milan. Seven members of the football team of Lutry and a girlfriend of one of the players were killed in the fire, while five other FC Lutry players were injured. Collège Champittet confirmed that several of its students and alumni died in the fire. Among the injured was Tahirys Dos Santos, a 19‑year‑old FC Metz footballer who was transferred to a specialist burns unit in Stuttgart, Germany, with severe injuries. The bar's co‑owner was present as a guest and sustained light burns to her arm. By 2 January, authorities had identified 113 of the 116 injured. Many victims hospitalised were in critical condition with third-degree burns; officials at Geneva University Hospitals (HUG) confirmed severe burns and trauma consistent with a flashover event. By 4 January, all fatalities were identified. All injured were identified by 5 January; the number was reduced to 116 after police found that three patients who were hospitalised for reasons unrelated to the fire had been added to the list in error.

According to the head of disaster victim identification Switzerland, Christian Brenzikofer, a temporary mortuary was established where DNA samples, fingerprints and dental records were collected. These were matched with ante-mortem information provided by relatives to identify victims.

== Investigation ==
Simplified diagram of the Le Constellation bar: 1 / To an additional seating area; 2 / Approximate start of fire; 3 / Basement bar area; 4 / Stairs to ground level; 5 / Ground-level bar area; 6 / Terrace; 7 / Exit

Cantonal ministers, police, and the cantonal attorney general, Béatrice Pilloud, held a press conference on the morning of 1 January. Pilloud said that an attack was not being considered as the cause of the fire. That evening, the cantonal authorities and the president of the Swiss Confederation, Guy Parmelin, who had visited the disaster site, held a second press conference.

Authorities stated that the investigation would examine renovations carried out at the premises, the condition of fire-extinguishing systems and escape routes, and the number of people present in the building at the time the fire began.

=== Cause of the fire ===
At a press conference the day after the fire, Pilloud said that, after reviewing photos and videos, "everything leads us to believe that the fire was started from sparkling candles or sparklers that were put on bottles of champagne that were moved too close to the ceiling."

=== Fire safety deficiencies ===
Pilloud said that the investigation would determine whether all safety standards had been met. Swiss fire safety regulations (Note: These regulations are established by the association of cantonal fire insurances (Association des établissements cantonaux d'assurance incendie, AEAI) and published online; they are declared binding by the intercantonal authority on technical barriers to trade (Autorité intercantonale des entraves techniques au commerce, AIET).) are generally stricter than those in other parts of Europe. They require, among other things, that public venues with a capacity of 200 people or more have several (emergency) exits, that bars have smoke exhaust systems, that furnishings in public venues be certified as non-flammable, and that any interior pyrotechnics receive permission from the authorities under very strict conditions.

Fire safety experts said that, based on photos of the bar's interior, the insulating material had not been installed correctly, which likely contributed to the rapid spread of the fire. They said that the insulation panels appeared to be made of a highly flammable material. A fire safety engineer said that Swiss regulations strictly prohibit leaving such combustible material visible; it must be covered to prevent rapid flame spread. Preliminary assessments suggest the material at Le Constellation was not laid according to these safety standards.

Footage from New Year's Eve 2019/2020, later broadcast by RTS, showed an employee warning patrons to 'watch out for the foam' as lit sparklers or more specifically gerbs were raised toward the basement ceiling, indicating that staff were aware of the fire risk posed by the ceiling material. The bar previously promoted its fire effects through video advertisements. A lawyer representing the family of a deceased employee said that the staff member concerned had received no safety training and was unaware of the fire risk posed by the ceiling. Although the bar's maximum capacity was 200 people, the municipal report indicated that the management advertised the possibility of accommodating up to 400 individuals through certain websites and social media platforms. Police are investigating whether fire extinguishers were present at the scene at the time of the incident. Former employees have claimed that fire extinguishers were stored in a locked room. The underground bar was not equipped with a sprinkler system. The mayor of Crans-Montana stated that a fire alarm was not mandatory for a bar of that specific size.

When the bar's operators took over in 2015, they reportedly renovated the premises themselves. While in custody, Jacques Moretti told prosecutors that he had purchased the acoustic foam from a do-it-yourself (DIY) store and installed it himself during those renovations. Social media images from that period suggest the staircase connecting the basement bar to the ground floor was made narrower, creating a bottleneck. The interior renovation appears to have lacked official authorisation. Gian Lorenzo Cornado, the Italian ambassador to Switzerland, expressed his suspicion that the stairs leading to the main exit had been narrowed to make room for additional tables. Furthermore, the main exit door opened inward and not outward, as required by fire safety regulations. According to media reports, 34 of the victims were found piled up at the bottom of the staircase, and witnesses told investigators that opening the ground-floor door was followed by a loud "whoosh" as flames surged upward.

In January 2026, parts of a building permit application submitted on 19 December 2025 became public. The documents included older architectural plans showing that an interior door on the upper floor measured 150 cm and opened inward rather than outward, contrary to fire safety requirements, and that the veranda door also opened inward. The renovation works completed in 2015, as reflected in these plans, involved changes to the terrace, modifications to the staircase and the installation of sound-absorbing foam panels. Both the 2025 application and an earlier one from 2015 concerned only the terrace, and no public permit application for interior alterations could be found.

A former bartender and witness said that the emergency exit in the basement was "always locked" during his visits. The mother of one of the victims stated on 6 January that her daughter, a former waitress at Constellation who was familiar with the emergency exit, was found in front of that door, which had been blocked. Moretti told prosecutors that a service door had been locked from the inside on the night of the fire and that he found several people lying behind it after forcing it open.

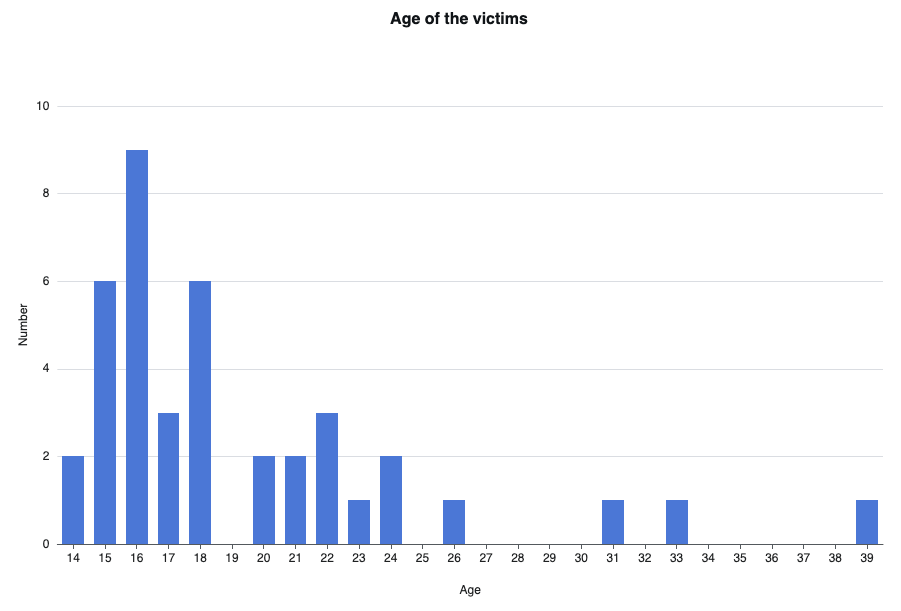
Bar chart illustrating the distribution of victims across different age groups

Media reports raised questions about whether age-restriction rules were observed on the night of the fire. Under cantonal law in Valais, persons under 16 are not permitted to remain in licensed venues serving alcohol after 22:00 unless accompanied by a parent or an authorised adult. Reporting indicated that several minors were present at the bar during the New Year's Eve celebrations, including victims under the age of 16, though it remains unclear whether these legal requirements were complied with.

=== Lack of official fire safety inspections ===
The municipality of Crans-Montana, which is responsible for fire inspections, said in a news conference that the bar had not been fire inspected since 2019, even though an annual inspection would have been required, and that previous inspections had only found minor issues. Nicolas Féraud, the mayor of Crans-Montana, said that the town could not explain and "bitterly regretted" this lax oversight. Fire safety inspections of the bar took place in 2016, 2018 and 2019, resulting in requirements for specific changes, the nature of which was not specified by the municipal council. Féraud said that the sound-absorbing foam, installed during a 2015 renovation, had never been specifically checked because inspectors "did not consider it necessary". He said that the foam used in the bar was considered acceptable during the 2019 inspection.

Valais Safety Director Stéphane Ganzer disagreed with the mayor's assertion that foam checks are not part of the inspection process. He emphasised that inspecting materials, particularly foams, is a vital component of any comprehensive inspection. Ganzer stated that under the law, municipalities are responsible for carrying out fire safety inspections, while the canton has supervisory and coordination powers and must receive inspection reports from the municipalities. SRF reported that the canton did not actively request missing inspection reports and therefore failed to notice that inspections in Crans-Montana had not been carried out for years.

Of the 128 bars and restaurants in Crans-Montana, only 40 had been inspected during 2025, despite inspections being required annually. The mayor of neighbouring Zermatt stated that many municipalities in Valais lacked sufficient resources to carry out the required number of inspections; however, Crans-Montana and Zermatt are among the wealthiest winter resorts in Switzerland.

Valais is one of the few Swiss cantons that does not legally require building insurance, which, in other cantons, conducts fire inspections. Municipal employees in small municipalities, who often undertake fire inspections amongst a host of other duties, often lack the expertise and routine required to conduct adequate inspections, according to a Swiss fire safety expert. Many serve on a part-time basis while continuing in their regular professions.

After the fire, local business owners accused municipal authorities of failing in their responsibility to enforce local fire safety regulations. They alleged that businesses in good standing with authorities were seldom if ever inspected, which they considered "mafia-like". An independent attorney filed a criminal complaint against municipal officials for negligent homicide, negligent grievous bodily harm, and negligent arson. Almost all Valaisan municipalities rebuffed or ignored an inquiry by the Neue Zürcher Zeitung regarding the frequency of their fire safety checks.

In early February, municipal authorities stated that the absence of fire safety inspections was partly attributable to an IT failure that left officials without reliable records showing which premises had been inspected and when. The disruption was linked to a system operated by a single self-employed IT specialist, which was taken offline, leaving authorities without access to the underlying files. According to testimony given to prosecutors, inspection records had to be reconstructed manually and numerous inspections carried out retroactively, but requests for additional staff to manage this workload were not approved. The failure reportedly affected not only Le Constellation but also other hotels, restaurants, schools and public buildings in Crans-Montana, some of which had never been inspected and others last inspected in 2018.

=== Criminal investigations ===
Two days after the fire, the cantonal prosecutors' office opened a criminal investigation against both owner-managers of the bar on suspicion of homicide by negligence, causing bodily harm by negligence, and arson by negligence. If convicted on all three charges, the maximum possible sentence is 4-1/2 years. On 29 January, prosecutors expanded the investigation to include a serving municipal official responsible for public safety and a former council fire safety officer. During questioning on 7 February, Christophe Balet, head of municipal safety in Crans-Montana, stated that he did not hold a fire-prevention licence. In February, prosecutors also questioned a former municipal safety inspection officer responsible for fire safety checks at the bar in 2018 and 2019, and opened criminal proceedings against him. That same month, lawyers representing an injured victim of the fire filed a criminal complaint against the mayor of Crans-Montana, alleging negligent bodily harm and breaches of municipal fire-safety duties. During court hearings, Jessica Moretti said that evacuation drills had never been conducted at the bar and that no authority had asked the owners to carry them out. On 9 March, the Valais public prosecutor's office opened criminal investigations against five additional people, including Crans-Montana mayor Nicolas Féraud, bringing the total number of people under investigation to nine.

The Paris public prosecutor's office opened an inquiry to support victims' families and to monitor the investigation being conducted in Switzerland. Italian prosecutors in Rome opened a separate criminal investigation, including a manslaughter probe, into the fire. On 27 January, Swiss authorities agreed to Italy's request to establish a joint investigation team (JIT), according to the Swiss Federal Office of Justice. In February 2026, Switzerland and Italy also agreed to strengthen judicial cooperation, allowing prosecutors from either country to be present during mutual legal assistance proceedings, including the evaluation of evidence already collected.

On 9 January, Jacques Moretti, one of the bar's co-owners, was detained by police after being deemed a flight risk. A few days prior, Alain Macaluso, head of the Centre for Criminal Law at the University of Lausanne, criticised investigating authorities in Valais for their failure to detain the two bar owners to secure evidence and prevent collusion, as well as for not conducting searches of the owners' business premises, private residences, or the municipal administration. On 12 January, the court of compulsory measures of Valais ordered Jacques Moretti to be placed in pretrial detention for three months. On 14 January, the Valais cantonal court ruled that Jessica Moretti would not be held in custody before trial but instead be subject to substitute measures, including a ban on leaving Switzerland, the surrender of identity and residence documents, daily reporting to a police station and the payment of a bond. On 17 January, the Valais public prosecutor's office set bail at CHF 200,000 for each of the two co-owners. On 23 January, Jacques Moretti was released from custody after bail of CHF 200,000 was paid on his behalf, while both co-owners remained under criminal investigation. On 24 January 2026, Italian Prime Minister Giorgia Meloni criticised the decision, calling it "a grave affront" to the victims and stating that Italy would seek an explanation from Swiss authorities.

With recordings from the bar's own cameras not available, Valais prosecutors on 15 January 2026 requested police to hand over videos recorded by around 250 public cameras filming public spaces in the village. At that point, according to Crans-Montana police chief Yves Sauvain, the video files had already been deleted under a seven-day retention period, which he said the cantonal prosecutors' office should have been aware of. Neue Zürcher Zeitung reported that the municipal police lacked access to footage from these cameras, while cantonal police had secured some recordings and other footage had disappeared.

=== Audit findings ===
In February 2026, reporting indicated that members of Crans-Montana's municipal executive were aware, before the fire, of problems within the authority responsible for fire safety inspections. An internal audit completed in 2023 identified unaddressed disciplinary cases, refusals by staff to carry out assigned tasks, outdated job descriptions, recruitment practices that prioritised personal or political connections over competence, and insufficient resources leading to staff overload and delays. The audit report was known only to the seven members of the municipal executive and department heads and was not made public.

== Aftermath ==
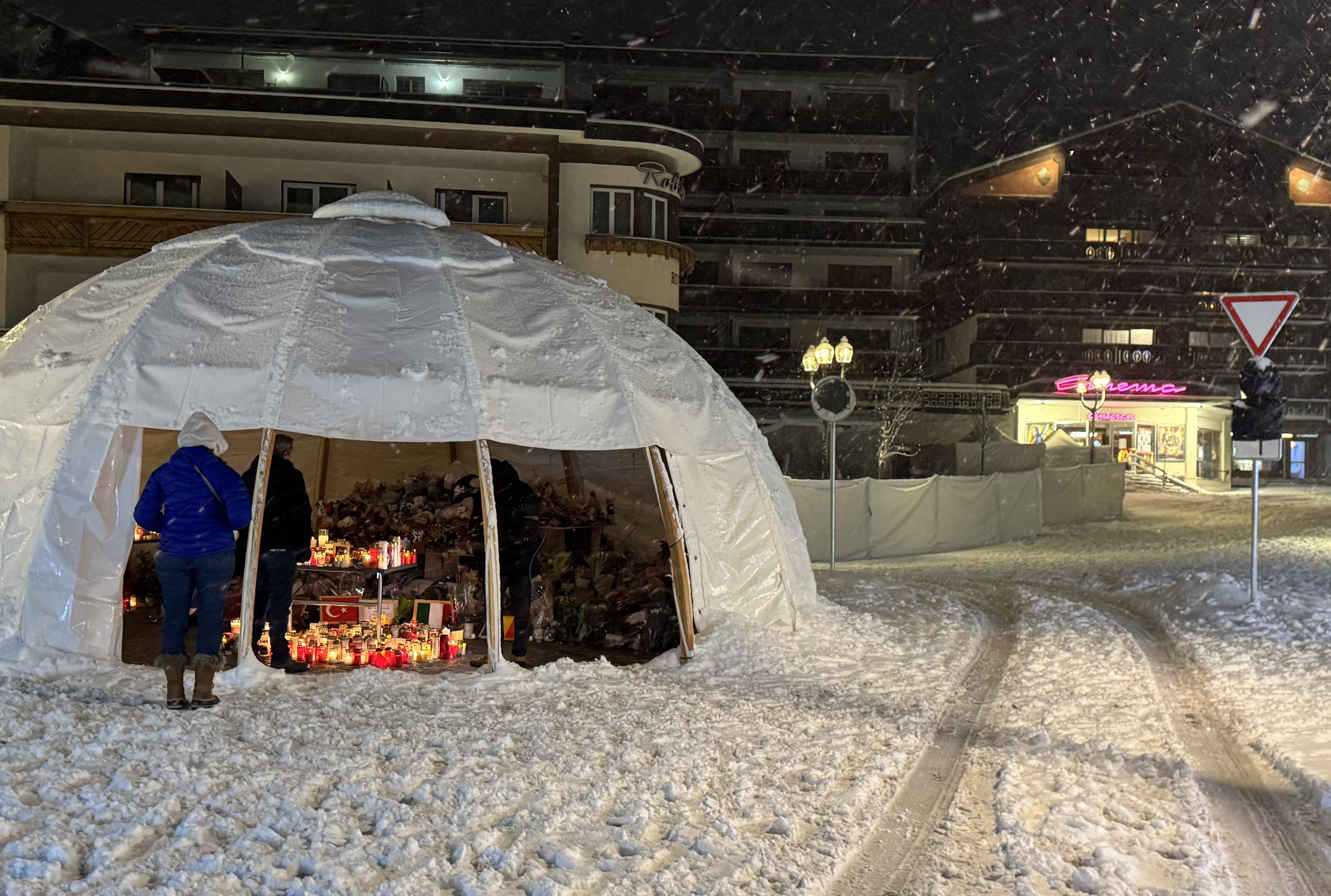
Memorial near Le Constellation, pictured on 8 January

In the days after the fire, authorities asked people in the Crans-Montana area to avoid skiing and other hazardous activities, as local hospitals were operating at capacity.

=== Statements of solidarity ===
Political leaders and governments around the world expressed solidarity with Switzerland and issued statements of condolence. President Parmelin thanked the countries that offered support. French President Emmanuel Macron expressed his "deep shock" at the incident and offered logistical support to Switzerland. German Foreign Minister Johann Wadephul conveyed his condolences and offered assistance with medical and identification efforts. Italian Prime Minister Giorgia Meloni described the incident as a "painful moment for the entire Alpine region", and clinics in northern Italy were put on alert to assist the injured. Foreign Minister Antonio Tajani visited Crans-Montana on 2 January 2026 and praised the cooperation between Swiss and Italian authorities in the aftermath of the fire. Liechtenstein Prime Minister Brigitte Haas expressed condolences and offered support to Swiss authorities.

=== Memorials ===
A makeshift memorial was set up near the bar. The Federal Council ordered flags on federal buildings to be flown at half-mast, and declared a five-day period of mourning. President Parmelin postponed his New Year's Day address to the nation; when it was broadcast that afternoon, he described the fire as "one of the worst tragedies that our country has experienced". The city of Lucerne cancelled its traditional New Year's fireworks in respect for those affected.

On 9 January, a national day of mourning was marked by a moment of silence and the tolling of church bells at 14:00 CET for five minutes. An official ceremony at Martigny, was attended by Parmelin, French President Emmanuel Macron, Italian President Sergio Mattarella, Belgian Prime Minister Bart De Wever and former Grand Duke of Luxembourg Henri. On 15 January, Pope Leo XIV publicly hosted 24 relatives of the fire victims at the Vatican. In a gesture of solidarity over the fire, several skiers formed a heart shape on one of the slopes in Crans-Montana. On the morning of 8 February, the makeshift memorial caught fire, damaging several commemorative objects inside. According to the police report, the fire was started by a candle, and any third-party involvement was ruled out. A moment of silence was also held prior to kickoff between Real Madrid and Real Betis.

=== Media coverage ===
On 6 January 2026, the Swiss Press Council issued a statement urging media outlets to exercise restraint in their coverage of the disaster. It said that the victims and their relatives were not public figures and that there was no public-interest justification for publishing victims' names or images. The Council warned against sensationalist reporting and referred to ethical guidance it had issued after a 2012 coach crash in Valais, in which 28 people, mostly children, were killed. It also cautioned that consent given by relatives while they are still in shock should not be lightly assumed.

=== Regulation ===
At the regulatory level, the intercantonal authority setting Swiss fire safety standards announced a halt to an ongoing project aiming at a revision and liberalisation of these standards, so as to be able to take the results of the investigation into the Crans-Montana fire into account. The municipal council imposed a ban on the use of pyrotechnic devices of any kind in enclosed areas throughout the municipality and commissioned an external specialist firm to inspect all public establishments, including the quality of materials. Following the fire, authorities in other Swiss ski resorts said they would carry out additional safety checks at bars and nightclubs to ensure that nothing similar could happen.

The disaster prompted public debate in Switzerland over whether the decentralised allocation of responsibilities for fire safety and inspections contributed to regulatory failures. Constitutional law professor Andreas Stöckli said that while responsibility lies primarily with cantonal and municipal authorities, fire safety standards are harmonised nationwide, and that the apparent shortcomings in Crans-Montana appeared to relate more to enforcement than to structural flaws in federalism.

On 7 March 2026, the intercantonal concordat of cantonal building directors adopted a nationwide ban on lighting pyrotechnics in publicly accessible indoor spaces, effective from 1 April 2026. Jean-François Steiert, president of the Intercantonal Organisation for Technical Trade Hazards (IOTH), described the ban as a direct consequence of the Crans-Montana fire.

=== Political assessments and impact ===
After the fire, Swiss and international media noted that the human errors that apparently contributed to the catastrophe were in stark contrast to Switzerland's reputation as a very well-organised and law-abiding society. They also noted that the canton of Valais has long had a reputation in Switzerland as a comparatively corrupt and lawless region of the country.

The Swiss German term for the local corruption found in (but not unique to) the Valais is Filz, felt, which evokes how personal, commercial, and official interests are as tightly intertwined in small communities as the fibres in a piece of felt. Various aspects of Valaisan society allow Filz to emerge. First, the Swiss principle of federalism assigns wide authority to the cantonal and municipal level. Many municipalities (though not Crans-Montana) are small and unable to attract competent political leadership and professional staff. Isolated from the outside world by mountains, Valaisan society tends to reject outside interference, such as national regulations perceived as cumbersome. The Valais's longstanding economic reliance on tourism has incentivized the lenient application of construction regulations, because business owners, developers, and local officials (who are often also notaries profiting off each transaction) all have an interest in facilitating tourism-related construction.

The Neue Zürcher Zeitung wrote that, in the rest of Switzerland, the question of whether the disaster had something to do with Valaisan political culture was increasingly being asked, and that it appeared likely to result in the largest administrative scandal in the canton's history. Valaisan historian Elisabeth Joris said that "political cronyism, a lack of critical thinking, administrative negligence and a certain complacency" run through the history of the canton, including a reflex to reject any criticism from the outside.

In the years leading up to the fire, the Valais openly flirted with its reputation as the "Swiss Wild West". For instance, the comedy TV series Tschugger follows a group of incompetent Valaisan police officers and a corrupt real estate developer, who is played by an actual Valaisan real estate developer. But after the fire, the Valaisan public and politicians bristled at outsiders' suggestions that local Filz might have contributed to the tragedy. The local newspaper Walliser Bote commented, "The Valais, remote, stubborn, with rough edges, with weaknesses and strengths, is apparently a suitable projection screen for everything that people like to overlook in their own canton." Nicolas Féraud, the mayor of Crans-Montana, said that he would not resign.

In February 2026, Swiss investigative reporting portal oeffentlichkeitsgesetz.ch published a 25-page collection of confidential internal minutes (obtained through a Swiss freedom of information act request) from five important meetings of the Swiss Conference of Secretaries-General (composed of the various heads of Swiss federal executive departments) about the disaster. The meetings were held on 6, 8, 13, 20, and 27 January 2026. The main goal of the meetings was to coordinate the federal response. They aimed to define responsibilities across departments and cantons, manage communication, support victims and their families, monitor injured patients, and prepare for legal, political, insurance, and international follow-up issues. The covered subtopics included questions about which top federal Swiss officials were to meet with victim families and how to respond to Italy recalling its ambassador in response to its government being dissatisfied with the investigation thus far.

== Liability ==
Given the great number of dead and heavily injured victims, some of whom may remain disabled and may need treatment and support for the rest of their lives, the fire is expected to generate substantial liability claims. A Swiss liability attorney estimated that lifetime treatment costs alone could amount to around CHF 1 million per burn victim, and that the total volume of claims would be in the hundreds of millions.

The apparent deficiencies with respect to fire inspections on the part of the municipality of Crans-Montana, as described above, may give rise to state liability claims. According to Valaisan state liability law, public authorities are liable, without limitation, for damage they unlawfully cause to third parties, if there has been a substantial breach of official duties. This would likely be the case in the event of omitted or irregular fire inspections, according to Felix Uhlmann, a Swiss professor of administrative law. Such state liability claims would primarily be directed against the municipality of Crans-Montana as the authority responsible for fire inspections, but claims against the canton of Valais as the municipality's supervisory authority are also conceivable.

If found civilly responsible in any criminal or subsequent civil trial, liability will also attach to the bar's owners and operators, but media reports stated that the total volume of claims would likely exceed their personal financial resources. The sum insured by Axa, the liability insurer of both the municipality of Crans-Montana and the bar Le Constellation, is reported to be around CHF 30 million in total, which has been described as insufficient to cover all potential claims. Axa proposed a "round table" of all involved insurers and authorities to quickly settle the claims.

Crans-Montana reported equity of around CHF 160 million at the end of 2024, which could also be used to cover the damage. Uhlmann said this would burden municipal finances if the municipality were found responsible and had to pay damages.

If not settled, these claims would be adjudicated in the first and second instance by the cantonal courts of Valais, and in the third instance by the Federal Supreme Court. Because Swiss law does not provide for class actions or other forms of collective litigation, the expected volume of hundreds of individual civil and administrative lawsuits could place a significant burden on the Valaisan courts. Foreign victims may also attempt to establish the jurisdiction of their countries' courts, especially in countries such as France or Italy where compensations awarded for injuries tend to be much higher than in Switzerland.

The dispute over medical costs escalated in April 2026 when Swiss hospitals mailed bills amounting to Euro 100,000 for the treatment of three Italian victims directly to their addresses in Italy. Swiss Canton of Valais president Mathias Reynard tried to justify the formal approach of his government with EU/Swiss regulations dealing with the reimbursement of cost for medical treatment, while Prime Minister Giorgia Meloni commented on the Swiss approach on social media as an "insult" produced by an "inhumane bureaucracy".

=== Compensation fund ===
On 14 January, the Valais cantonal government announced the creation of a fund to support victims of the fire, providing CHF 10,000 for each person who was hospitalised or died, and said that a public donation account had been opened. On 26 January, it announced a further CHF 10 million allocation to a foundation for victims and their families, and confirmed that funeral and repatriation costs for the deceased would be covered. In early February, the municipality of Crans-Montana announced it would contribute an additional CHF 1 million to the victims' foundation. On 25 February, the Federal Council announced plans to provide a CHF 50,000 solidarity payment to victims of the fire and to the families of those who died, with the funds to be released following adoption of the emergency legislation by Parliament. In a separate initiative, it also announced plans to contribute up to CHF 20 million to facilitate out-of-court settlements between victims, insurers and authorities, with the aim of avoiding lengthy legal proceedings.

== See also ==
- List of building or structure fires
- List of disasters in Switzerland by death toll
- List of fireworks accidents and incidents
- List of nightclub fires
- Homicide through negligence in Swiss law
