= 2016 Portugal wildfires =

Series of wildfires in Portugal, 2016

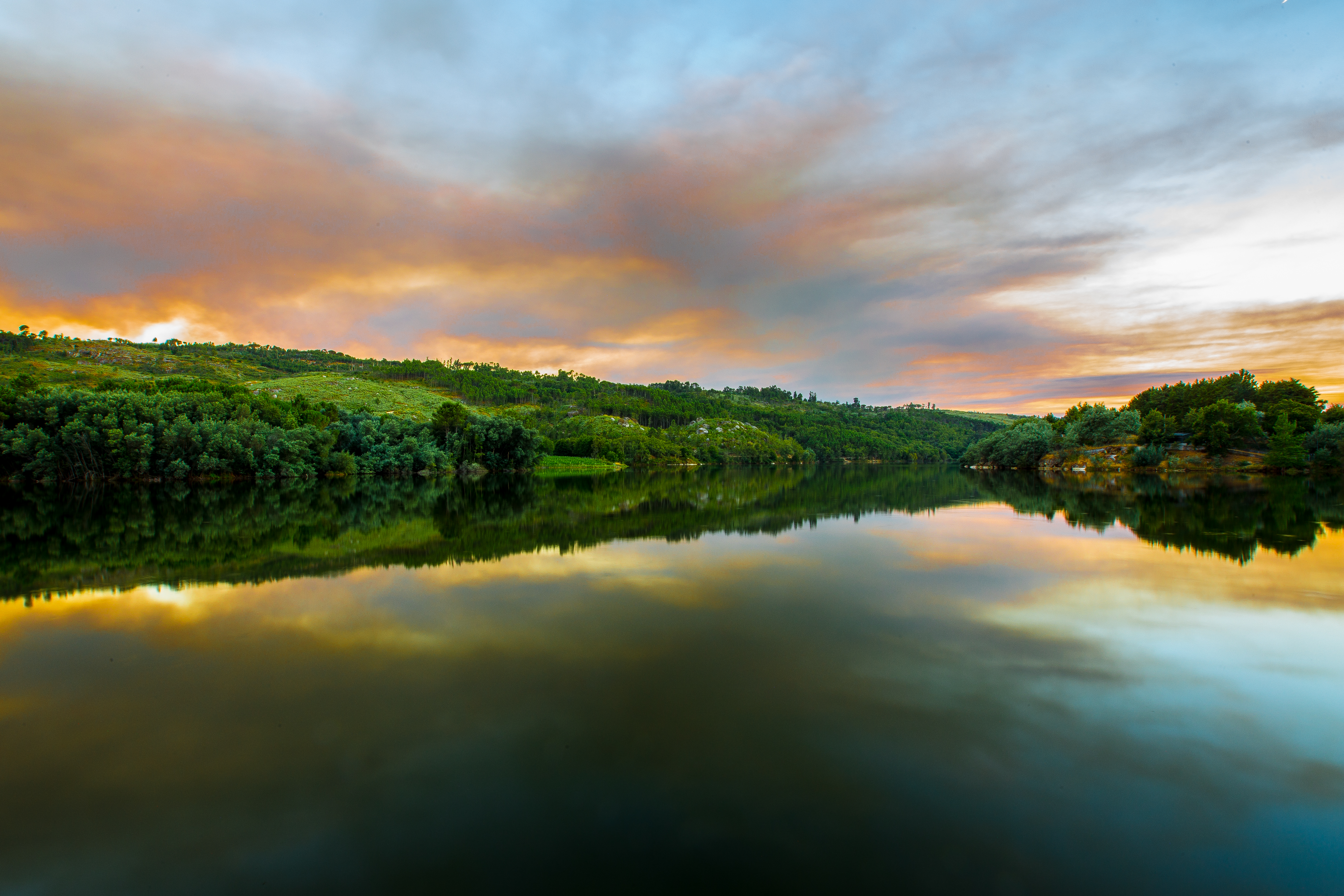
- Fire by the Dão River, in northern Portugal, August 2016
- Location: Mainland Portugal and Madeira archipelago

Statistics
- Total fires: At least 515 as of 9 August

Impacts
- Deaths: At least 4
- Injuries: One seriously burned, scores of others treated for smoke inhalation
- Structures destroyed: 37

The 2016 Portugal wildfires were a series of wildfires that burned across mainland Portugal and the Madeira archipelago in the North Atlantic Ocean during August 2016. The fires caused over one thousand people to evacuate and destroyed at least 37 homes near Funchal on Madeira Island. Flights at Cristiano Ronaldo International Airport were also disrupted due to high levels of smoke.

At least seven major fires were reported to be out of control in northern Portugal on 9 August. According to officials, the fires in Arouca and São Pedro do Sul were the biggest. Over 4,200 firefighters backed by 30 aircraft battled fires across the mainland. An emergency was declared in Portugal's northern Norte Region as firefighters battled numerous wildfires.

== Fire in Madeira ==
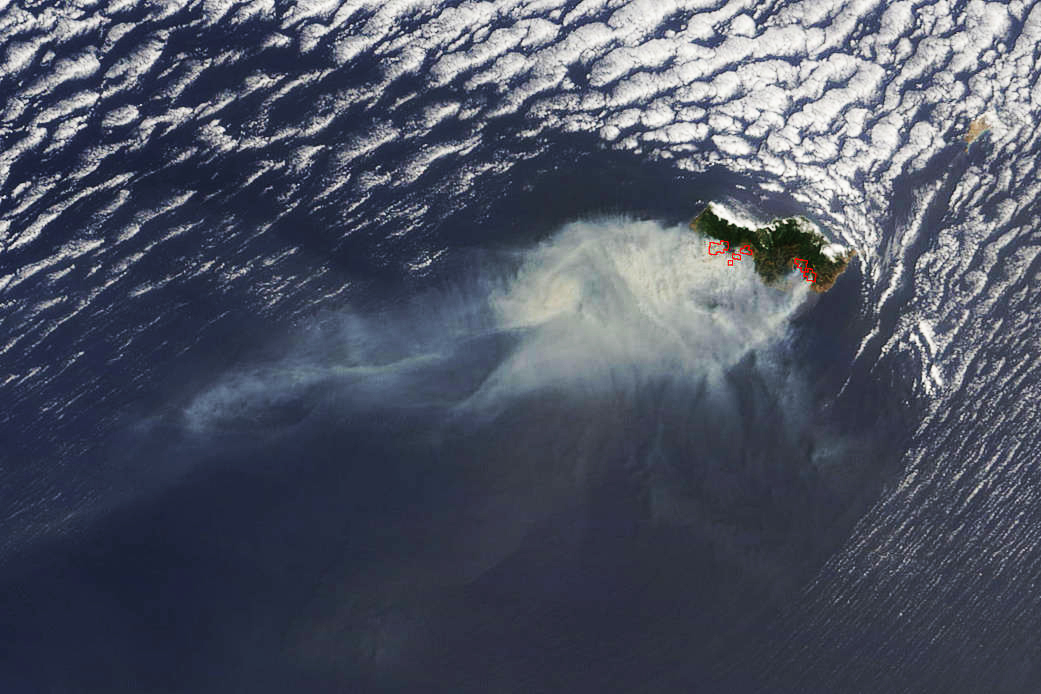
Smoke from several large fires burning on Madeira blowing over the Atlantic Ocean on 10 August

On 9 August 2016, a fire allegedly caused by arson started in the S. Roque parish in Madeira. It quickly spread throughout the region of southern Madeira and to its capital, Funchal. Madeira's regional president Miguel Albuquerque said the fire was "under control" despite it still burning on several fronts. The statement was later qualified.

The fire caused four deaths and displaced one thousand people. Choupana Hills Resort & Spa, a five-star hotel, was gutted by the flames. Three arson suspects were detained, one of whom was held in pre-trial detention.

== Arouca fire ==
Arouca was one of the most affected municipalities during the 2016 Portugal wildfires. The Arouca fire was caused by multiple fires that covered a total of 26,821 hectares (66,280 acres). Occurring between 6 and 15 August, they also affected Castelo de Paiva, Vale de Cambra and São Pedro do Sul. No casualties were reported; some residents were evacuated.

== Evacuation ==
Authorities evacuated the Choupana Hills Resort & Spa hotel and gave public servants a day off to help relocate people affected by the fires. Two hospitals and two elderly homes were also evacuated. 950 people sheltered in army barracks and schools around the island.

== Online reactions ==
The hashtag #PrayForPortugal trended on social media in response to the wildfires.

== International support ==
The South Yorkshire Fire and Rescue service in the United Kingdom sent a large amount of specialist equipment to volunteer colleagues in Portugal after they appealed for equipment. The shipment included hose-reel fittings, ropes, and tools. The European Union helped Portugal combat the wildfires. Italy and Spain sent three Canadair airplanes and Morocco sent two. East Timor donated €2 million to Portugal to help fight the fires and support the victims. Russia was also expected to send air support due to a bilateral agreement between the two countries. Cristiano Ronaldo also donated £100,000 to his hometown of Funchal.

== See also ==
- List of wildfires
- August 2003 wildfires
- 2017 Portugal wildfires
- 2024 Portugal wildfires
