= Gerb (pyrotechnic) =

Type of pyrotechnic device (firework)

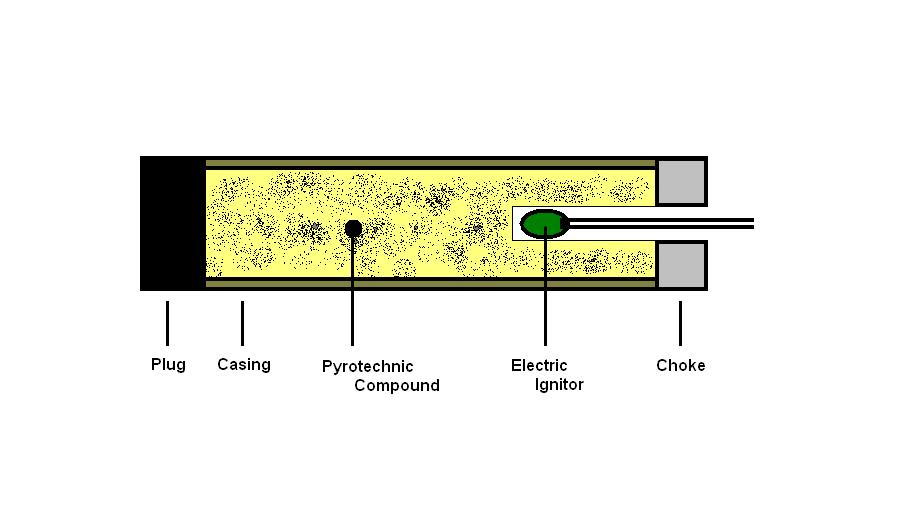
A basic pyrotechnic device

A gerb is a type of firework which produces a jet of sparks, usually lasting between 15 and 60 seconds. It is a thick-walled tube filled with pyrotechnic composition and possessing a choke, which is a narrowing in the tube. Gerbs are often referred to as 'fountains'.

== Operation ==
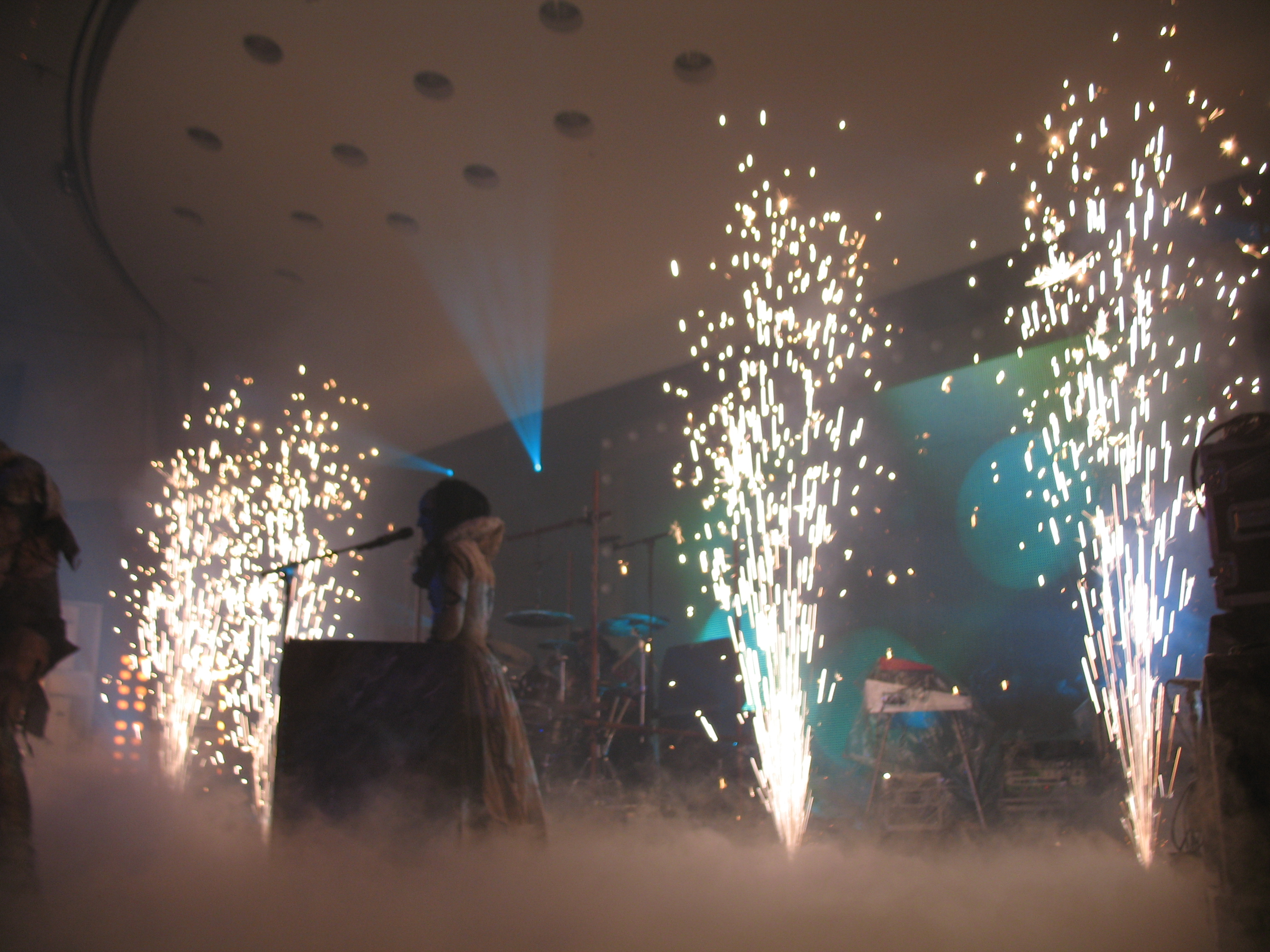
Gerbs in operation

Sometimes a small charge of black powder is added to the bottom of a gerb to make it finish with a bang: this charge is known as the 'bounce'. These are commonly used at sporting events.

Gerbs intended for use indoors near a proximate audience, such as at a rock concert, typically have shorter durations (from 1/8 to 30 seconds) and heights (4 to 50 feet).

Gerbs are usually measured in terms of time and height. For example, a 4×4 burns for 4 seconds at a height 4 feet (1.2 m).

== History ==
Eric Newby's book The Last Grain Race (chapter two: "Mountstewart") contains a 1938 reference to what appears to be the original gerb, a mortar bomb fired from a mortar.

=== Hazards and accidents ===
Causes of the 2003 The Station nightclub fire in West Warwick, Rhode Island, US, involved the use of gerbs, as did the fire in the Colectiv nightclub in Bucharest, Romania, in 2015.

The use of these pyrotechnic devices in unsuitable premises has caused several more disasters with numerous casualties, such as the fire at the Cuba Libre bar in Rouen, France, in 2016 and the fire at the Le Constellation bar in Crans-Montana, Switzerland, in 2026.

==== Fire at the Cuba Libre bar in Rouen ====
During the night of 5–6 August 2016, a fire broke out at the establishment following the use of pyrotechnic fountains (synonym for gerbs). The premises had been illegally converted into a nightclub, without adequate safety precautions, and were unsuitable both for this purpose and for the use of such pyrotechnic devices. The accident killed fourteen people and injured five.

==== Fire at the Le Constellation bar in Crans-Montana ====
On 1 January 2026, a major fire at the Le Constellation bar, located in the ski resort of Crans-Montana, in the canton of Valais, Switzerland, during New Year's Eve celebrations, reportedly involved "pyrotechnic fountains" (equivalent to gerbs) placed on champagne bottles. The devices were reportedly positioned close to the ceiling, where they ignited the ceiling material. The accident killed forty-one people and injured 115.

In media coverage of the fire, the general press used numerous terms to refer to the fountains involved: bougie-fontaine, bougie incandescente, bougie étincelante, bougie scintillante, bougie-étincelles, and bougie festive, to describe the gerbs pyrotechnic devices actually used.
