= 2017 Portugal wildfires =

2017 Portugal wildfires may refer to:

- June 2017 Portugal wildfires
- October 2017 Iberian wildfires
