= Climate change in Portugal =

Climate change affects various environments and industries in Portugal.

== Greenhouse gas emissions ==
Greenhouse gas emissions in Portugal amounted to 28% of total emissions: 17,748,000 tonnes of carbon dioxide equivalent in 2019. Emissions per capita equated to 4.84 tonnes of carbon dioxide equivalent.

== Impacts ==
The risk of dengue fever due through mosquitoes would increase due to climate change.

== Response ==
=== Policies ===
As of 9 April 2025, more than half of municipalities lacked a climate action plan. As of 9 April 2025, there was not a single region with a climate action plan.

=== Legislation ===
==== Climate Framework Act ====
Climate Framework Act Lei n.º 98/2021, de 31 de dezembro

Assembly of the Republic
- Enacted: 2021-12-31
- Status: In force

Portugal passed the Climate Framework Act in 2021. In 2023, Portugal was taken to court over the lack of effective implementation measures, after the release of the National Energy and Climate Plan 2030.

== See also ==
- Energy law
- Environment of Portugal
