= 2026 Spain wildfires =

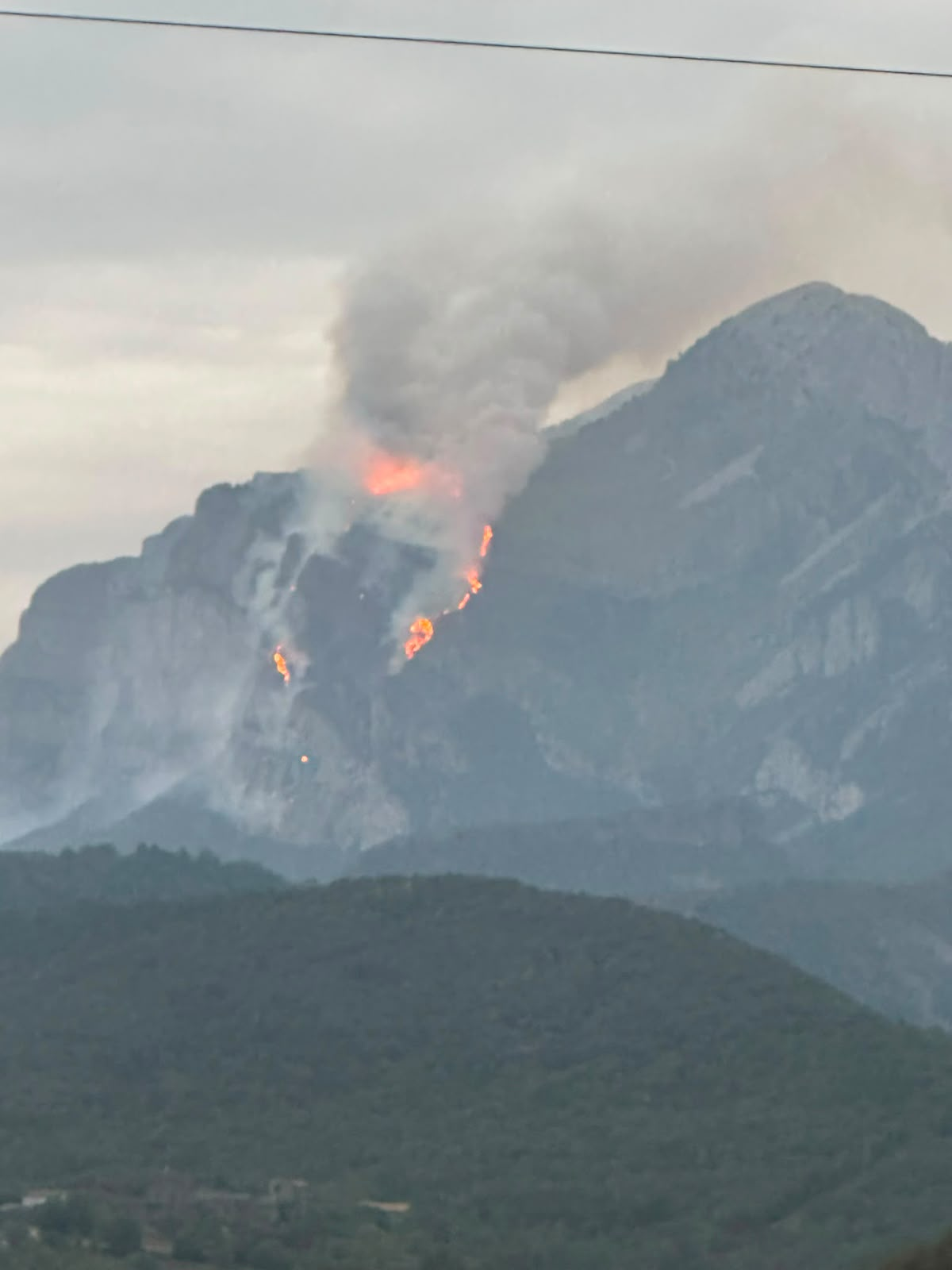
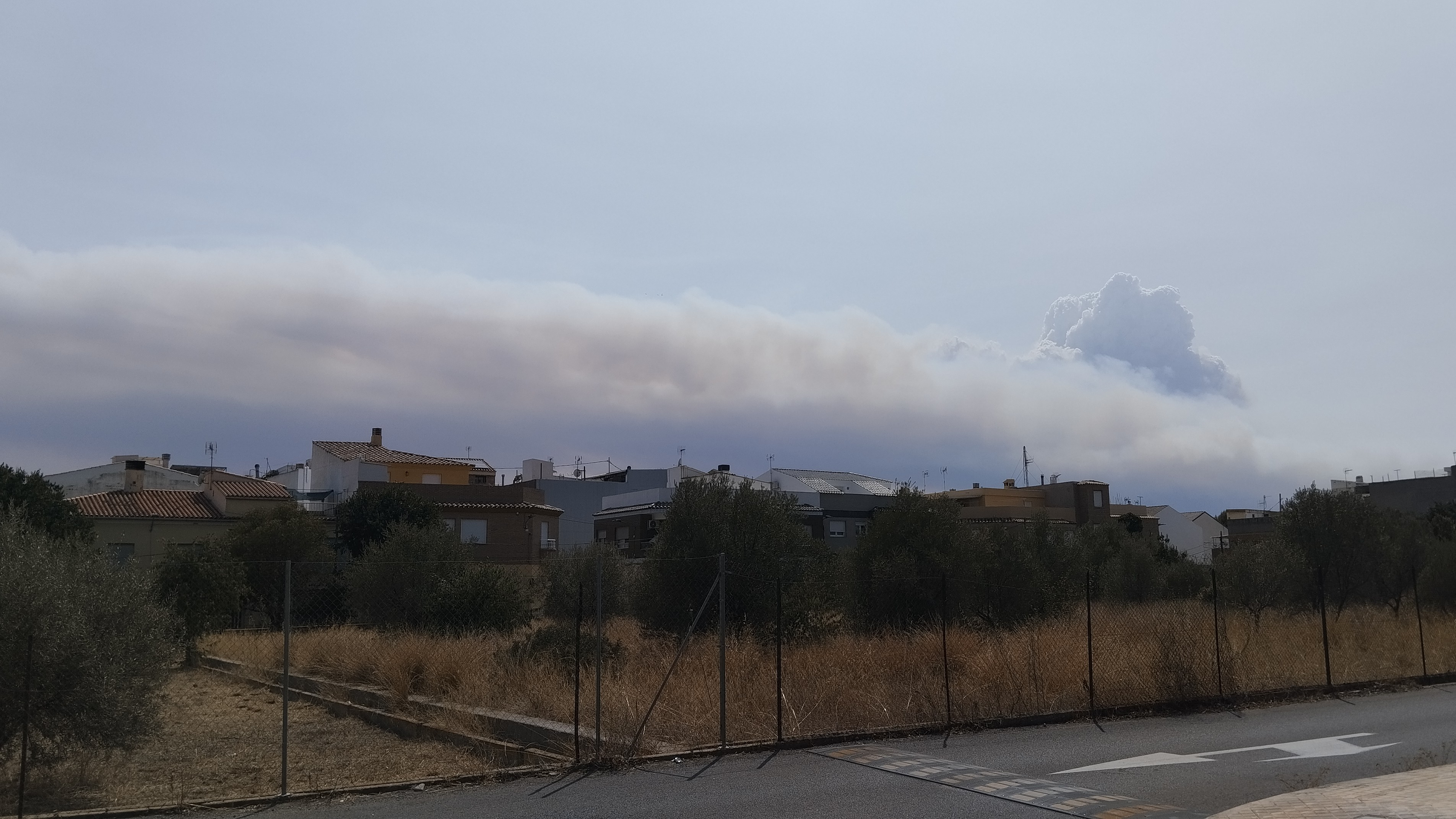
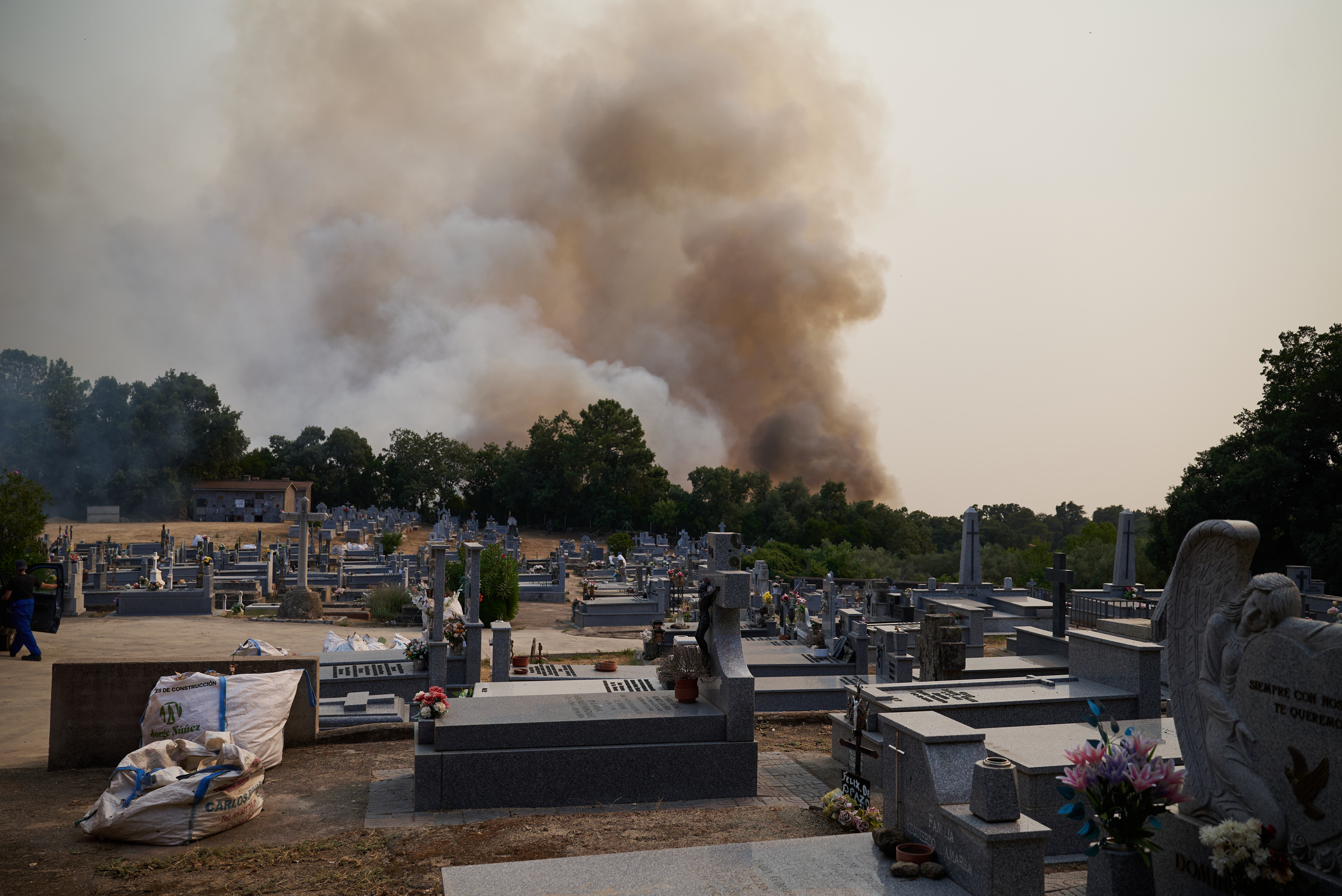
- From top to bottom, from left to right: Fire in Peña Montañesa; Smoke cloud from la Vall d'Uixó wildfire visible from the outskirts of Castellón; Piedralaves Cemetery in Ávila during the Burgohondo fire in July
- Date: July 2026

Statistics
- Status: Ongoing wildfire
- Perimeter: uncertain contained
- Total area: 150,000 ha (370,000 acres)

Impacts
- Deaths: 16
- Evacuated: 80,000

Ignition
- Motive: Under investigation

Map
- Perimeters of 2026 Spain wildfires (map data)

In 2026, wildfires have affected Spain, reported in the north and south of the country. 150,000 hectares have been burned.

== Background ==
The wildfires have been exacerbated by the 2026 European heatwaves.

== Wildfires ==
=== Almería ===
Almería saw the deadliest wildfire in Southern Spain.

=== Guadalajara ===
In July 2026, a fire started at Sierra Norte Natural Park in Guadalajara. As of 23 July, the wildfire has burned over 32,000 hectares.

=== North east ===
Wildfires have affected the North East of Spain.

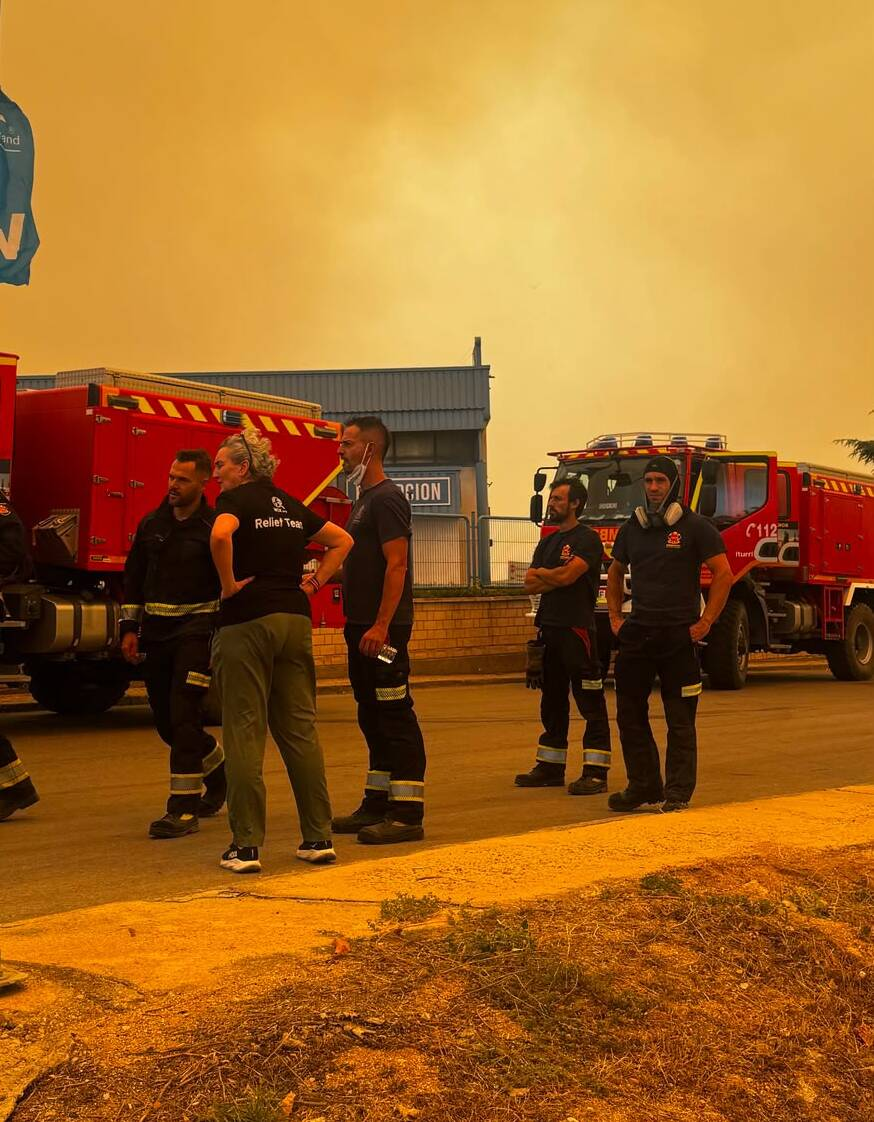
Madrid firefighters and the World Central Kitchen near the wildfire zone on Ávila

=== Ávila and Madrid ===
By 24 July, two fires in the Ávila and Madrid provinces, about 50km west from the city of Madrid, merged into a single blaze, the wildfire, which had burned 15,000 hectares between the two provinces, was regarded by Spanish officials as "beyond the capacity of firefighters to contain", forcing the evacuation of 60,000 people, and burning through the Madrid Deep Space Communications Complex.

=== La Vall d'Uixó ===
In the province of Castelló, a fire began burning hectares in a neighborhood near the mountains of the town of la Vall d'Uixó, starting on the morning of July 25. The fire front entered the Sierra de Espadán Natural Park. As of July 26, the wildfire had spread, burning around 6,500 hectares and causing the evacuation of 18,000 people. During the afternoon, the Emergency Coordination Center of the Valencian Government sent alerts for the evacuation of the towns of Azuébar and Almedíjar; both are part of the natural park. Due to smoke inhalation, 19 people have required medical attention. The fire is suspected to have been naturally set. The Emergency Coordination Center later issued another alert, this time to communicate the lockdown of the municipality of la Vall d'Uixó, and later in the nearby towns of Betxí and Onda, due to the smoke produced by the fire.

== Evacuations ==
On 29 July 2026, the authorities allowed thousands of evacuees to return home.

== Impact on sporting events ==
The Baja Aragón was postponed to September due to the wildfires.

== International assistance ==
Spain activated the European Union Civil Protection Mechanism in July 2026 to support efforts to combat the wildfires. The European Union deployed six firefighting aircraft from Greece, Italy, and Turkey, as well as 134 firefighters and 41 vehicles from Portugal. The Copernicus Programme also provided emergency satellite mapping to support response operations, while pre-positioned European firefighting teams already stationed in Spain were immediately deployed to reinforce national responders.

On 4 August 2026, Argentine footballer Lionel Messi donated €80,000 to support reconstruction efforts in the Sierra Oeste region of the Community of Madrid following the wildfires. Isabel Díaz Ayuso, President of the Community of Madrid, publicly thanked Messi for the donation.

== See also ==
- 2026 France wildfires, a concurrent wildfire season in France
- Climate change in Spain
