= The European Union's Civil Protection Mechanism =

Coordination during a state of emergency

- EU member states participating non-EU member states
- Formation: 2001
- Type: Intergovernmental mechanism to help with disasters
- Headquarters: Brussels
- Budget: 574 million€ (2014-2020)
- Website: https://civil-protection-humanitarian-aid.ec.europa.eu/what/civil-protection/eu-civil-protection-mechanism_en

The civil protection mechanism of the European Union, also called the European civil protection mechanism, was created in 2001 by the European Union (EU). It allows the participating countries (the EU member states and the ten members not in the EU) to coordinate help in an emergency of great magnitude in which the countries' civil defence services cannot cope (not limited to the organisations' members). It can be deployed throughout the world.

== History ==
The EU civil protection mechanism (MEPC) was created in 2001 with the objective of helping member states or other countries within the organisation in the event of a catastrophe.

The role of the MEPC was greatly changed on 17 December 2013 as the European legislation was modified. The EU had carried out these changes in light of a "significant increase in the numbers and severity of natural and man-made disasters in recent years" which made the MEPC "increasingly important".

== How the MEPC functions ==
The mechanism is based on protection of people but it can also protect the environnent and other areas. The mechanism has been used to help across the world such as in the Ebola epidemic in western Africa.

Composition of the response resources on 15 January 2026
| Type of resource | Number | Providing state |
|---|---|---|
| High Capacity Pumping | 21 | Germany (5), Austria (1), Belgium (1), Bulgaria (1), Estonia–Latvia–Lithuania (1), Finland (1), France (1), Italy (1), Netherlands (1), Poland (2), Romania (2), Slovakia (1), Slovenia (1), Sweden (1), Ukraine (1) |
| Water purification | 7 | Germany (1), Austria (1), Belgium (1), Denmark (1), Spain (1), France (2) |
| Flood Containment | 2 | Austria (1), France (1) |
| Flood Rescue with Boats | 8 | Austria (2), Belgium (1), Croatia (1), France (2), Romania (1), Tchéquie (1) |
| Light Urban Search and Rescue | 2 | Cyprus (1), Italy (1) |
| Medium Urban Search and Rescue | 6 | Spain (2), Estonia (1), Portugal (1), Romania (1), Turkey (1) |
| Heavy Urban Search and Rescue | 11 | Austria (1), France (2), Hungary (1), Italy (1), Netherlands (1), Poland (1), Tchéquie (1), Turkey (2), Ukraine (1) |
| Team for water search and rescue | 1 | Spain (1) |
| Team for mountain search and rescue | 1 | Spain (1) |
| Structural Assessment Capacity | 3 | Croatia (1), Spain (1), Italy (1) |
| Cave Search and Rescue | 3 | Croatia (1), Spain (1), Slovenia (1) |
| Explosive ordnance disposal module | 1 | Estonia (1) |
| Team with unmanned aerial vehicles | 4 | Croatia (1), Spain (1), France (2) |
| Air operation support capacity | 1 | Belgium (1) |
| Other Response Capacities for evacuation support | 1 | Slovakia (1) |
| Shelter Capacities | 2 | Slovakia (1), Sweden (1) |
| Cultural Heritage Protection | 1 | France (1) |
| Mobile Lab | 1 | Germany (1) |
| Medical Air Evacuation | 2 | Romania (2) |
| Emergency Medical Team type 1 | 16 | Spain (2), Estonia (1), France (1), Greece (1), Italy (1), Lithuania (1), Norway (1), Poland (2), Portugal (1), Romania (2), Tchéquie (1), Turkey (1), Ukraine (1) |
| Emergency Medical Team type 2 | 7 | Belgium (1), Denmark (1), Spain (1), France (1), Italy (2), Turkey (1) |
| Emergency Medical Team for evacuation by road | 1 | Ukraine (1) |
| Maritime Incident Response Group | 2 | France (1), Netherlands (1) |
| Marine Pollution Capacities | 1 | Sweden (1) |
| Forest Fire Fighting with Planes | 2 | France (1), Greece (1) |
| Ground Forest Fire Fighting | 8 | Cyprus (1), Spain (2), France (2), Greece (1), Poland (1), Portugal (1) |
| Ground Forest Fire Fighting with Vehicles | 18 | Germany (1), Austria (2), Bulgaria (1), Finland (1), France (2), Greece (2), Poland (3), Portugal (1), Romania (2), Slovakia (1), Slovenia (1), Tchéquie (1) |
| Team for firefighting advisory/assessment | 1 | Spain (1) |
| Mobile biosafety laboratory | 1 | Netherlands (1) |
| CBRN Detection and Sampling | 8 | Germany (1), France (2), Portugal (1), Italy (1), Greece (1), Romania (1), Austria (1) |
| CBRN Decontamination | 2 | Ukraine (1), Austria (1) |
| Search and Rescue in CBRN conditions | 2 | Portugal (1), Austria (1) |
| Technical Assistance and Support Team (TAST) | 6 | Germany (1), Denmark (1), Finland (1), Italy (1), Netherlands (1), Sweden (1) |
| Communication Platforms | 2 | France (1), Luxembourg (1) |
