= 2024 Portugal wildfires =

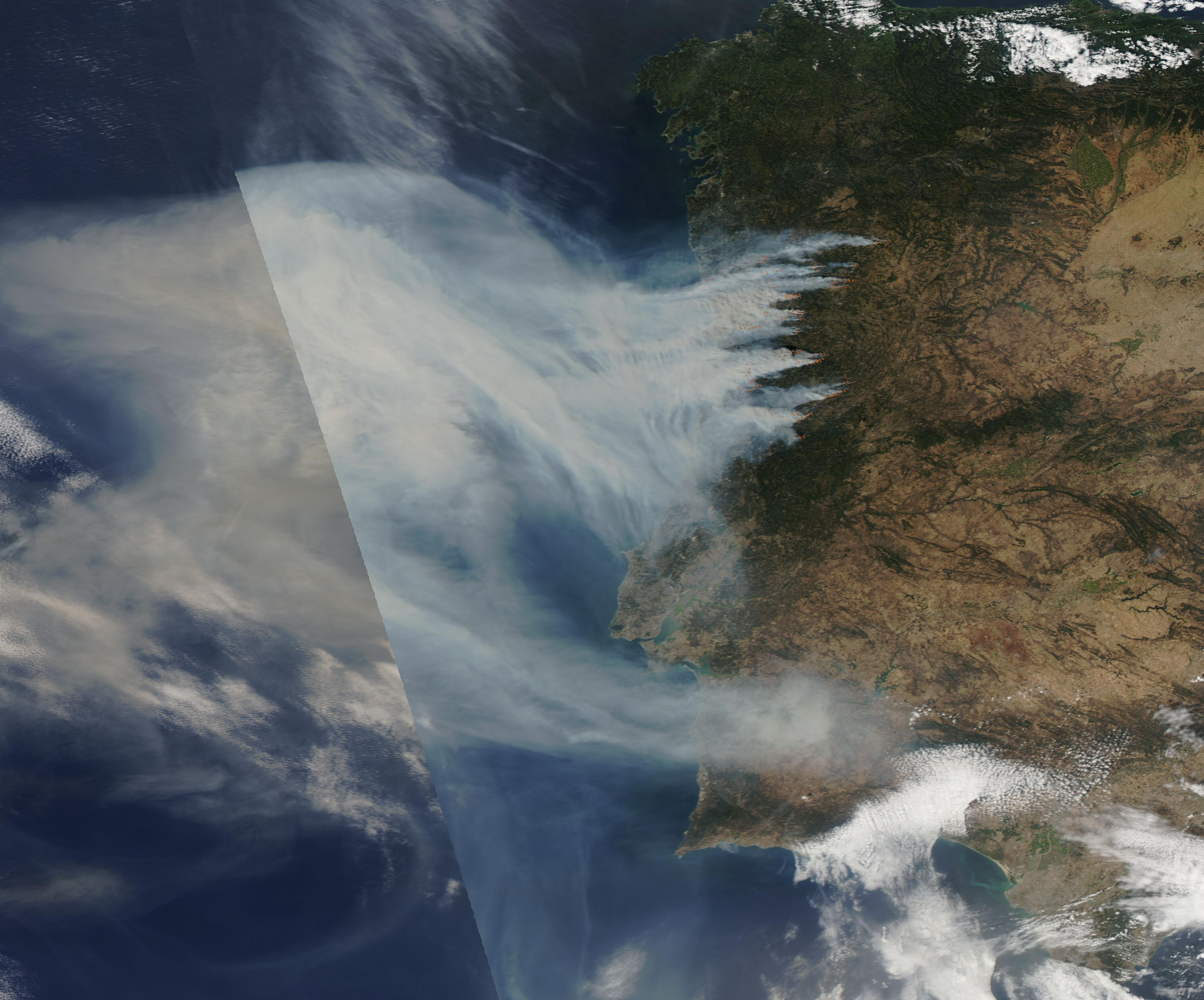
- NASA satellite image, taken on 17 September, showing the clouds of smoke from the fires in Portugal.
- Date: 15–20 September
- Location: Central and Northern Portugal

Statistics
- Total fires: 1,040+
- Total area: 135,752 hectares (524.1 square miles)

Impacts
- Deaths: 9
- Injuries: 175
- Structures destroyed: 60

Ignition
- Cause: Exceptionally dry conditions, excessive heat, strong wind gusts, possible arson

The 2024 Portugal wildfires were a series of more than 1,000 wildfires, at least 128 labeled as devastating, that spread through central and northern Portugal between 15 and 20 September 2024, although the fires were controlled by 20 September, authorities and firefighters remained on the ground in order to be vigilant for several more days, burning more than 135,000 hectares of land, resulting in the deaths of at least nine people - amongst them were four firefighters -, the evacuation of several villages, and a response of over 5,000 firefighters with assistance from the European Union.

== Wildfires ==
Wildfires began in mid-September and spread across central and northern Portugal, with at least 128 separate fires being reported by 16 September that had burned about 10,000 hectares (39 square miles) between the northern municipalities of Aveiro District and Porto District. Blazes reached Albergaria-a-Velha in Aveiro District and burned down multiple houses.

The triggering and rapid spread of the wildfires were caused by "unusually dry conditions" and strong gusts of wind that reached up to 70 km/h (43 mph), in addition to temperatures reaching or exceeding 30 °C (86 °F) from 14 to 16 September. At the same time, police has also arrested several people for suspected arson which, combined with the unusual weather and high temperature conditions, aggravated considerably the scale of the wildfires.

== Impact ==
At least nine people were killed due to the wildfires, including three firefighters who were trapped inside a vehicle in Tábua, and five civilians. Portuguese police found the body of a victim of the wildfires, who worked at a logging company and was helping rescuing material when the fire came. Nearby, one firefighter died in Oliveira de Azeméis after suffering from cardiopulmonary arrest as he battled nearby fires. Two more people suffered serious injuries which included burns and respiratory difficulties, requiring them to be hospitalized. Twelve more firefighters were injured while combating blazes, four of whom were injured severely.

The mayor of Albergaria-a-Velha, António Loureiro, reported that four houses had burnt down and at least twenty more were in danger in the town's residential and industrial perimeters, requiring the evacuation of several districts. Two more homes were destroyed in Cabeceiras de Basto, in Braga.

== Response ==
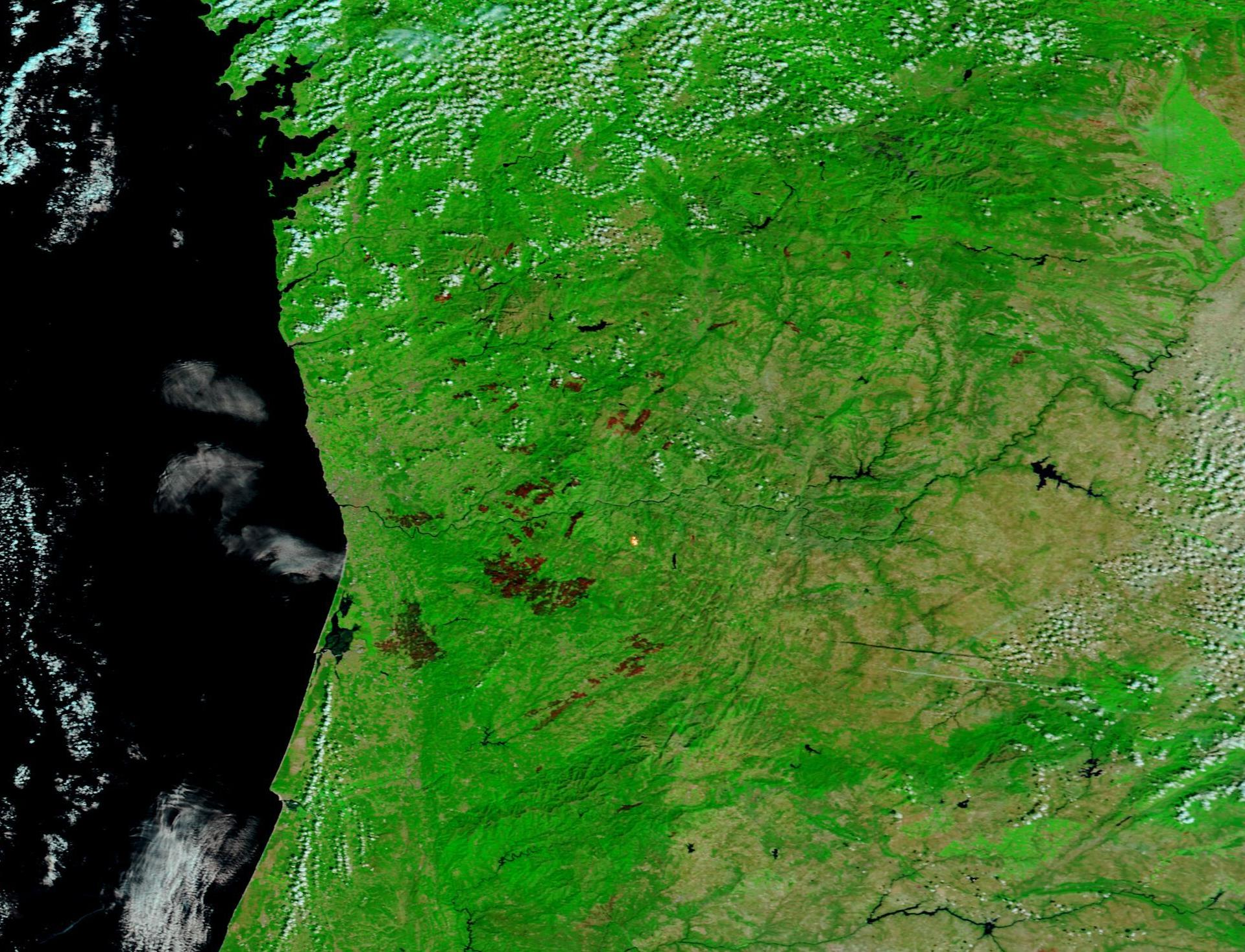
Satellite image showing the burned areas after the fires were controlled.

A "special red alert" status was implemented across all of continental Portugal. Portuguese authorities issued evacuation orders for several villages close to the wildfires. Authorities also shut down several roadways close to ongoing wildfires and thick smoke, including sections of the main highway connecting Lisbon and Porto. At least 70 residents were forced to evacuate in the Aveiro region.

Over 5,000 firefighters and 1,500 fire engines were assigned to combat spreading fires across the nation. Of these, about 1,100 firefighters and twelve firefighting aircraft were assigned to fight four fires in and around Aveiro district, including the one that entered Albergaria-a-Velha. Eight more firefighting aircraft were requested by Portugal from the European Commission under the RescEU program. Spain sent two aircraft while France and Greece both stated that they would send two more each. President of the European Commission Ursula von der Leyen stated that the EU was "urgently mobilising" and requested that other EU member states also send assistance.

== See also ==
- 2024 European floods – Concurrent European climate-related disaster
- 2024 Attica wildfires
- 2024 Russian wildfires
- 2024 Turkey wildfires
