= Monte Real =

- Civil parish
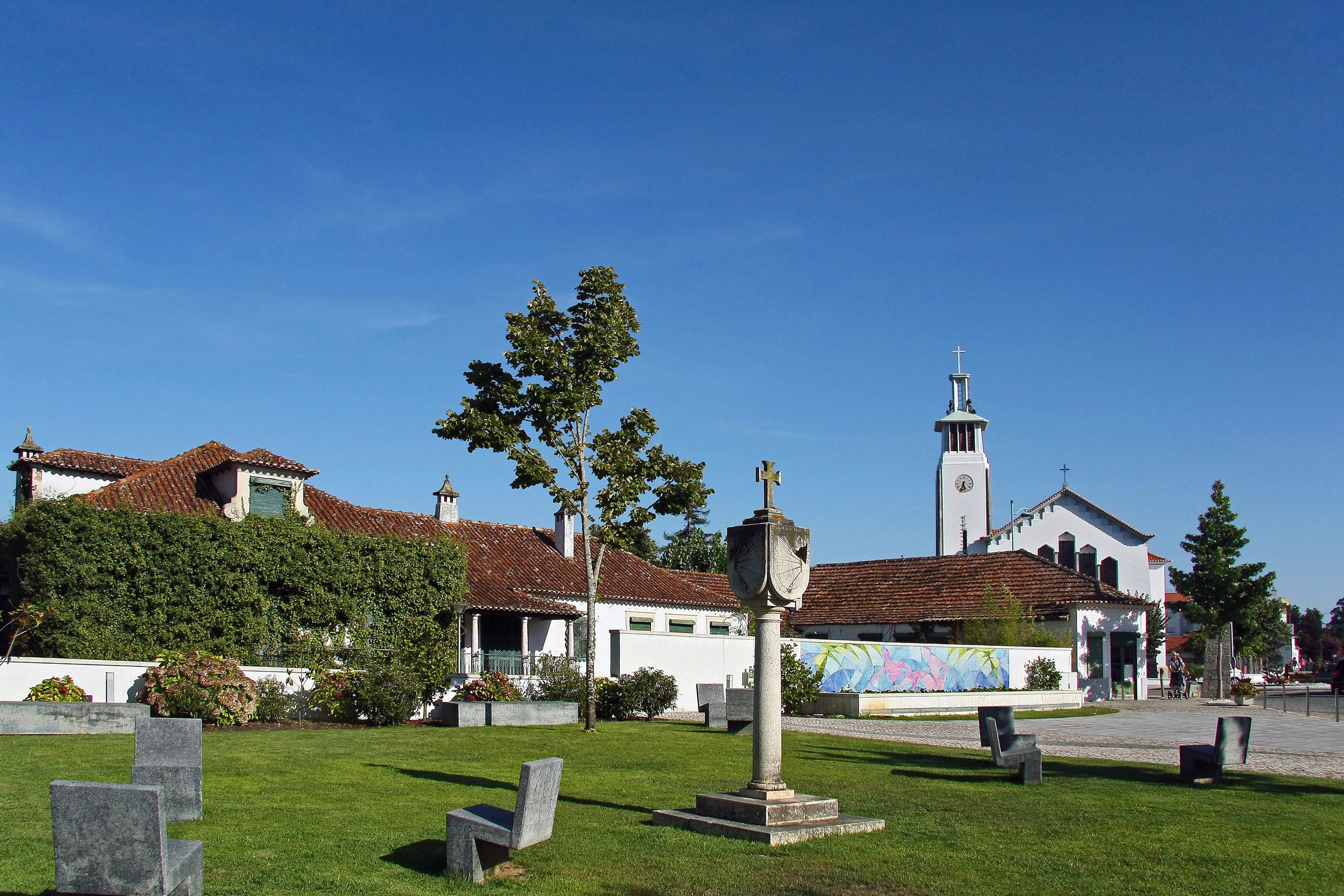

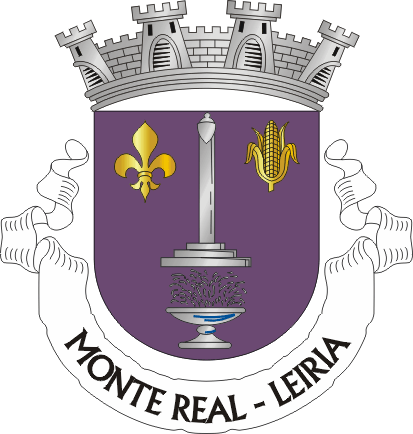
- Coat of arms

- Location in Portugal
- Coordinates: 39°49′52.4″N 8°52′42″W
- Country: Portugal
- Region: Centro
- Intermunic. comm.: Região de Leiria
- District: Leiria
- Municipality: Leiria
- Disbanded: 2013

Area
  - Total: 12.23 km^{2} (4.72 sq mi)

Population (2001)
  - Total: 2,778
  - Density: 227.1/km^{2} (588.3/sq mi)
- Time zone: UTC+00:00 (WET)
  - Summer (DST): UTC+01:00 (WEST)

Monte Real is a town (vila in Portuguese) and a former civil parish in the municipality of Leiria, Portugal. In 2013, the parish merged into the new parish Monte Real e Carvide. It covers an area of 12.23 km^{2} and has a population of 2,778 people. Monte Real, which in English means Royal Mount, was once a municipality (pt: concelho), before being annexed to Leiria municipality.

Monte Real hosts an air base (base aérea), Monte Real Air Base for the Portuguese Air Force.

Monte Real is also known for its hot springs, (Termas de Monte Real).

In January 2026, Storm Kristin caused a catastrophic damage in the town. The Monte Real Air Base was severely affected.

== Climate ==
Climate data for Monte Real Air Base, 1971-2000, altitude: 32 m (105 ft)
Month	Jan	Feb	Mar	Apr	May	Jun	Jul	Aug	Sep	Oct	Nov	Dec	Year
Record high °C (°F)	21.2 (70.2)	24.4 (75.9)	28.3 (82.9)	29.6 (85.3)	35.7 (96.3)	42.3 (108.1)	39.0 (102.2)	39.5 (103.1)	39.4 (102.9)	34.0 (93.2)	27.4 (81.3)	24.0 (75.2)	42.3 (108.1)
Mean daily maximum °C (°F)	14.3 (57.7)	15.3 (59.5)	17.3 (63.1)	18.1 (64.6)	19.8 (67.6)	22.8 (73.0)	24.9 (76.8)	25.1 (77.2)	24.4 (75.9)	21.1 (70.0)	17.4 (63.3)	15.1 (59.2)	19.6 (67.3)
Daily mean °C (°F)	9.6 (49.3)	10.7 (51.3)	12.3 (54.1)	13.5 (56.3)	15.5 (59.9)	18.2 (64.8)	20.0 (68.0)	20.1 (68.2)	19.1 (66.4)	16.2 (61.2)	12.8 (55.0)	10.8 (51.4)	14.9 (58.8)
Mean daily minimum °C (°F)	4.9 (40.8)	6.1 (43.0)	7.2 (45.0)	8.9 (48.0)	11.1 (52.0)	13.6 (56.5)	15.2 (59.4)	15.1 (59.2)	13.9 (57.0)	11.3 (52.3)	8.2 (46.8)	6.5 (43.7)	10.2 (50.3)
Record low °C (°F)	−5.6 (21.9)	−4.0 (24.8)	−2.6 (27.3)	0.0 (32.0)	3.8 (38.8)	5.0 (41.0)	8.6 (47.5)	8.4 (47.1)	4.4 (39.9)	−1.2 (29.8)	−2.5 (27.5)	−4.0 (24.8)	−5.6 (21.9)
Average rainfall mm (inches)	101.2 (3.98)	92.9 (3.66)	59.7 (2.35)	72.6 (2.86)	64.0 (2.52)	23.6 (0.93)	8.5 (0.33)	10.6 (0.42)	36.0 (1.42)	92.7 (3.65)	110.8 (4.36)	118.1 (4.65)	790.7 (31.13)
Average rainy days (≥ 0.1 mm)	14.5	14.5	12.5	14.4	11.9	8.2	5.6	5.0	8.2	13.3	14.0	15.8	137.9
Average relative humidity (%) (at 9 AM)	95	88	89	79	78	77	79	81	85	87	89	90	85
Mean monthly sunshine hours	148.1	140.9	205.1	213.7	242.7	262.5	285.7	281.8	225.9	186.9	148.0	128.3	2,469.6
Percentage possible sunshine	49	47	55	54	54	58	63	66	61	54	49	44	55
Source: Instituto Português do Mar e da Atmosfera

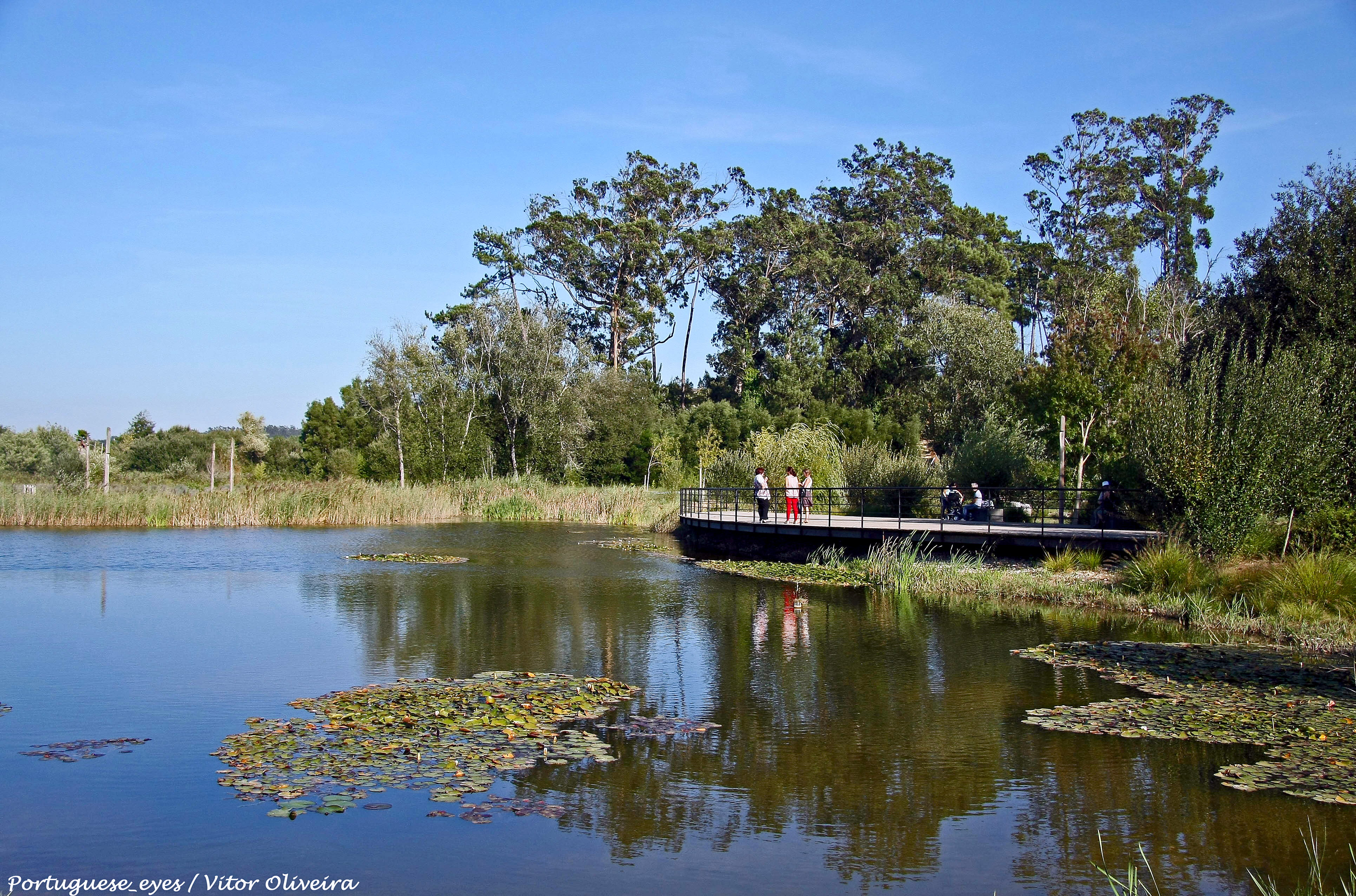

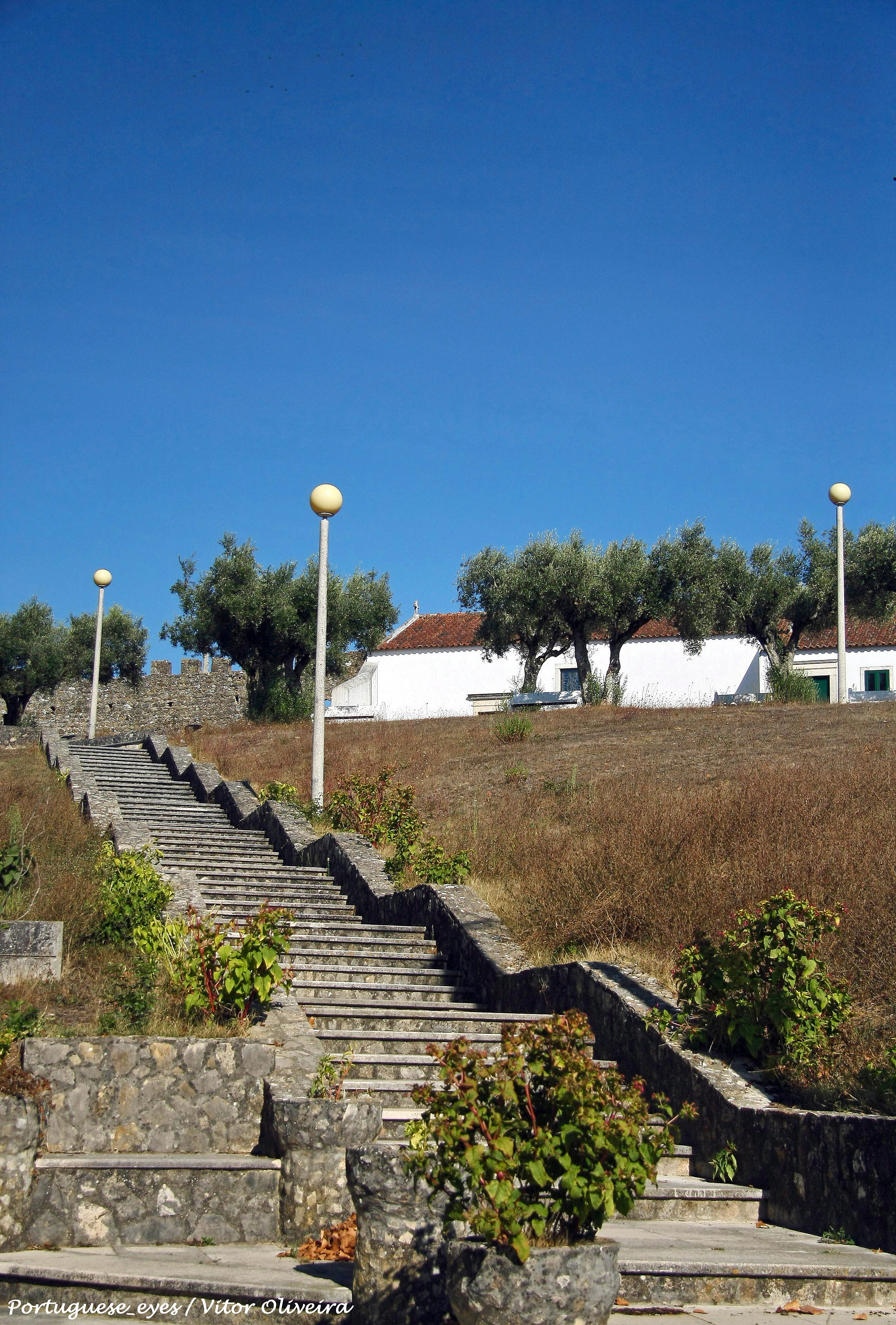

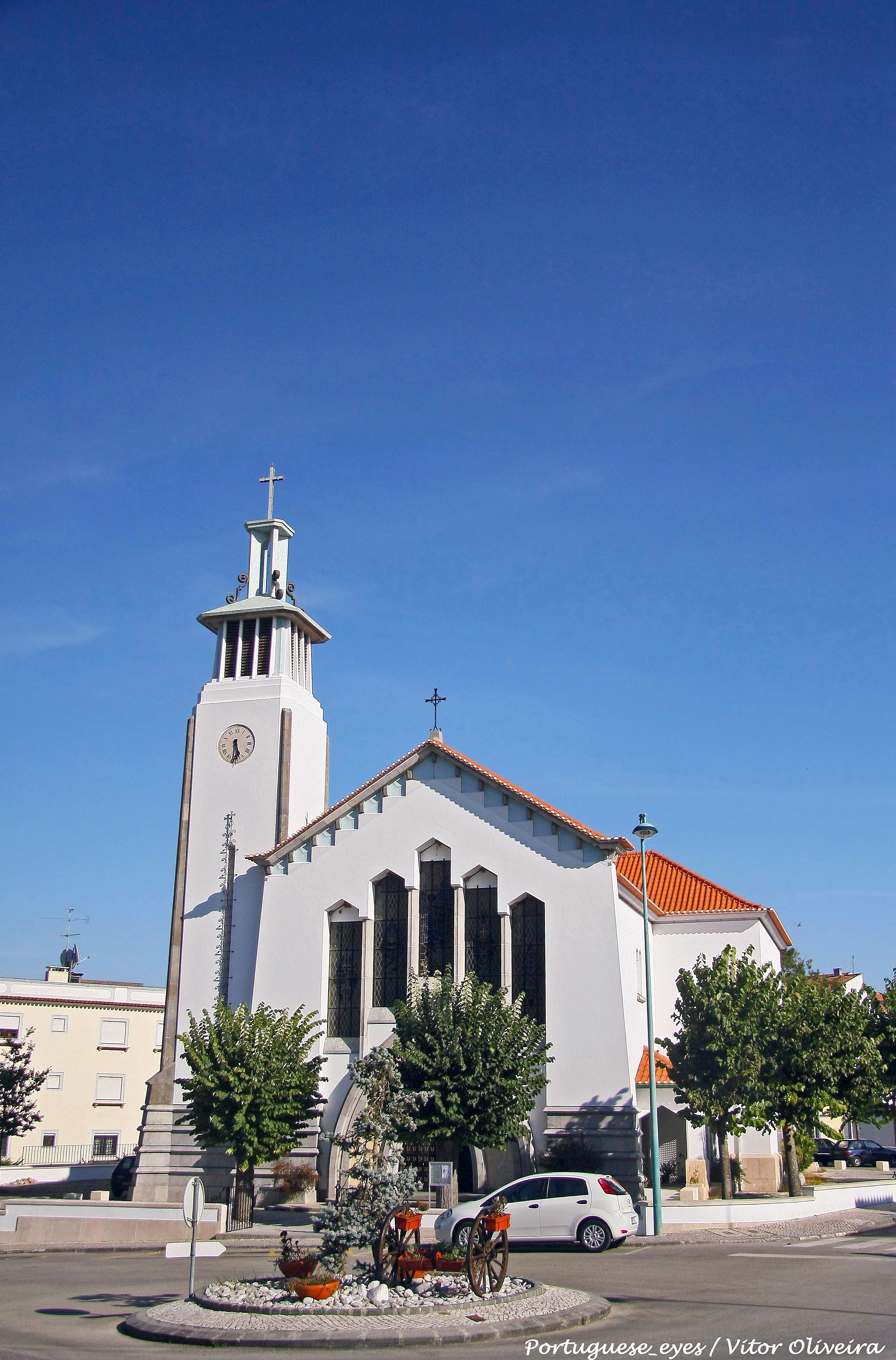

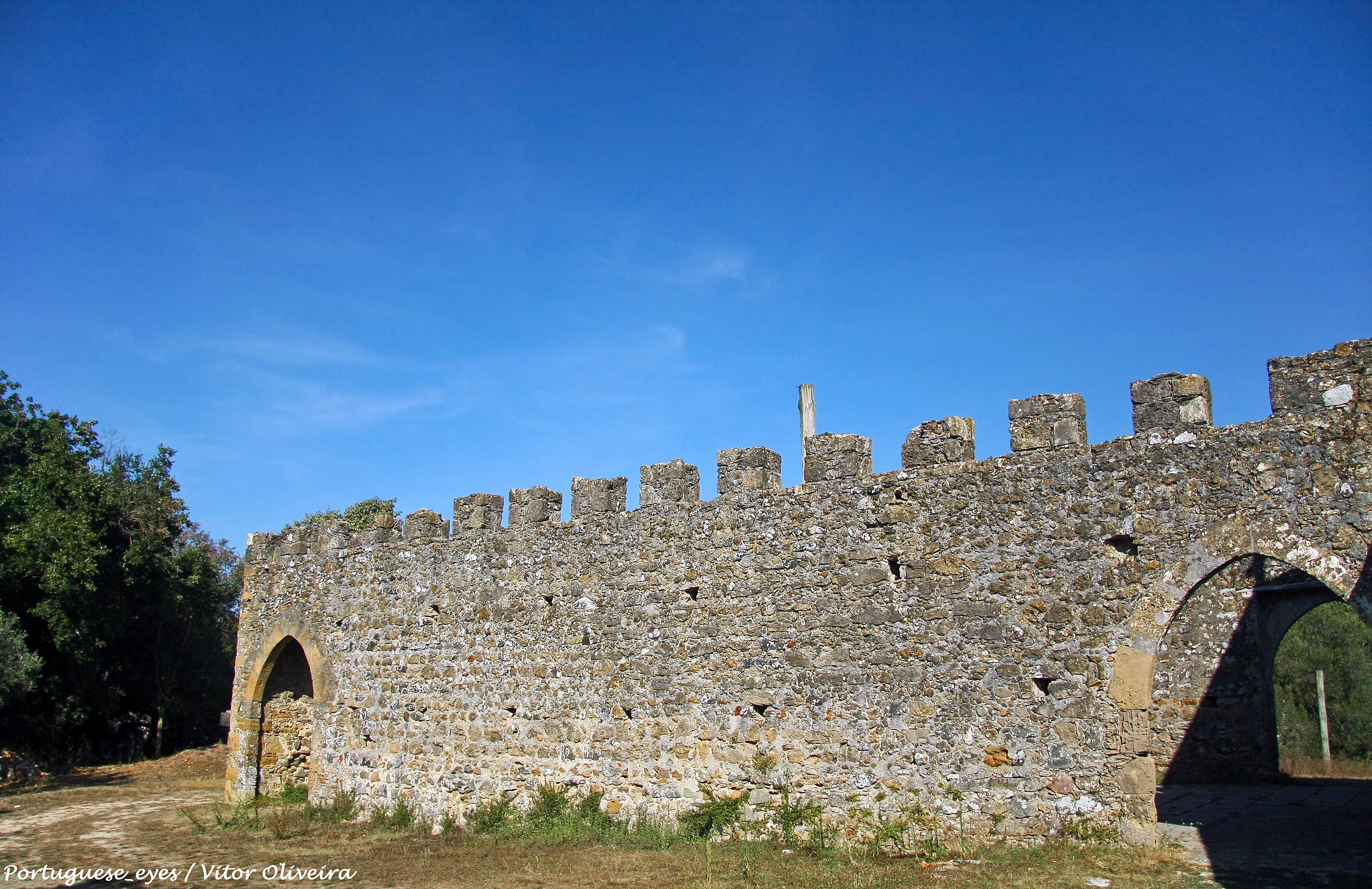
