= Leiria =

City in Central Portugal

- City, municipality, and district capital
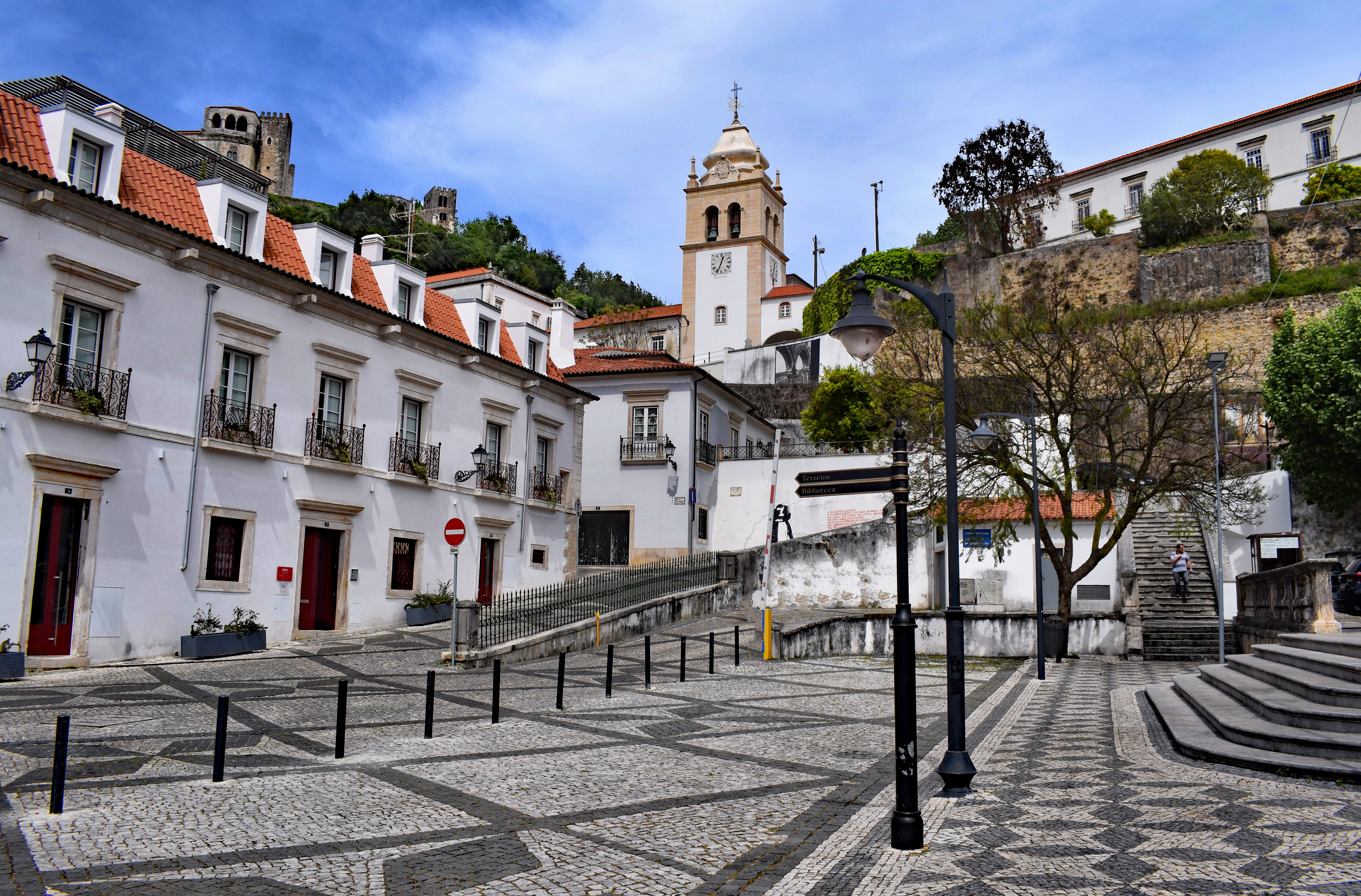
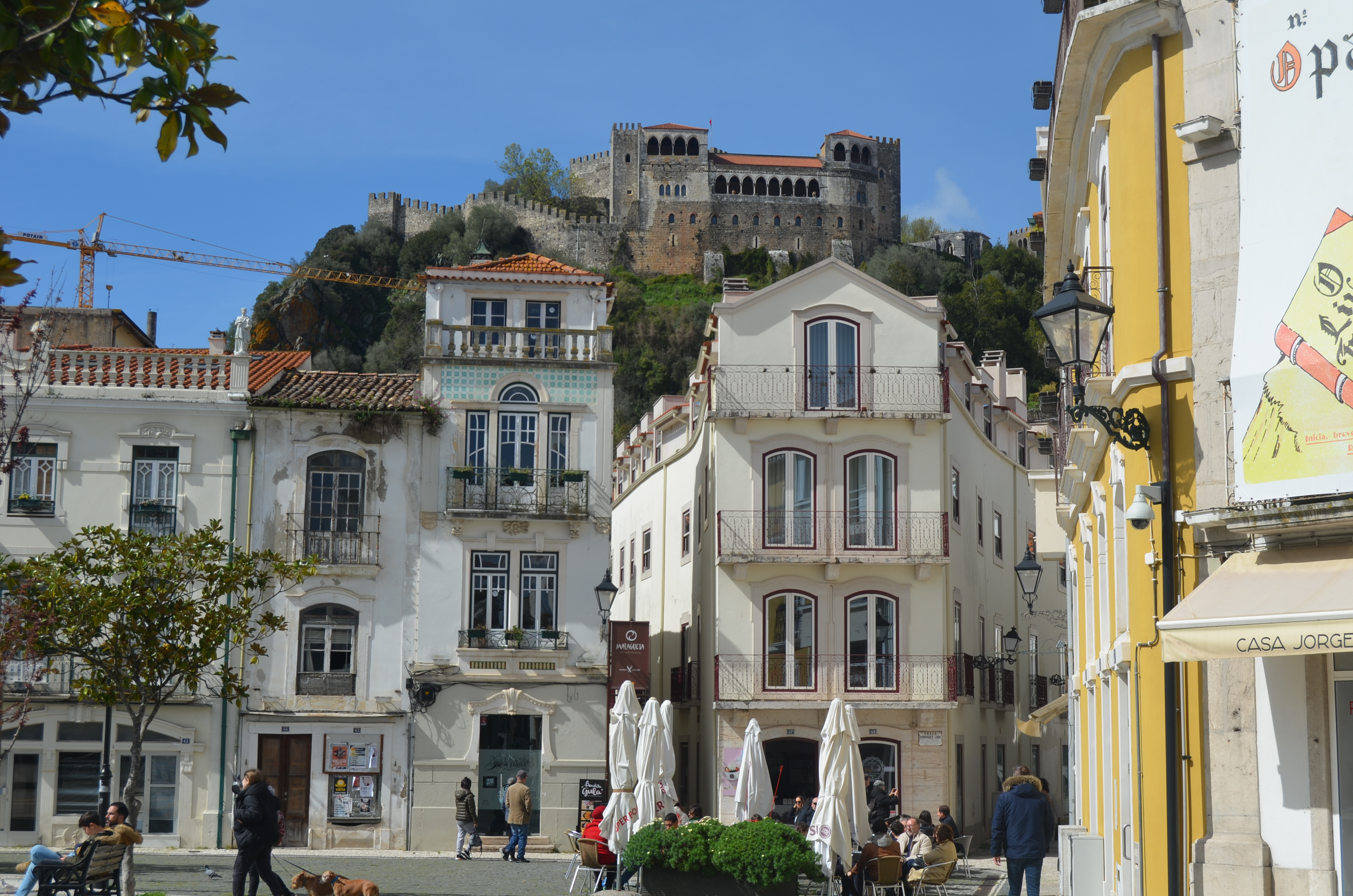
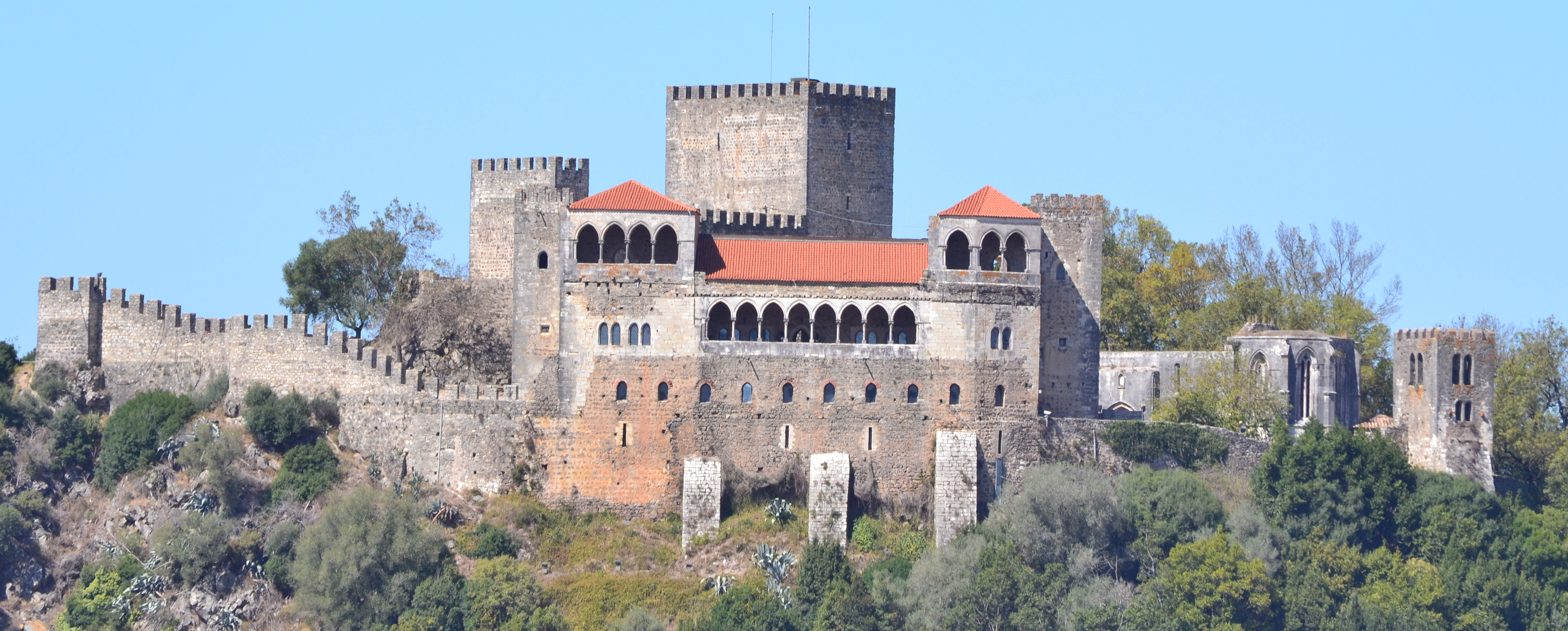
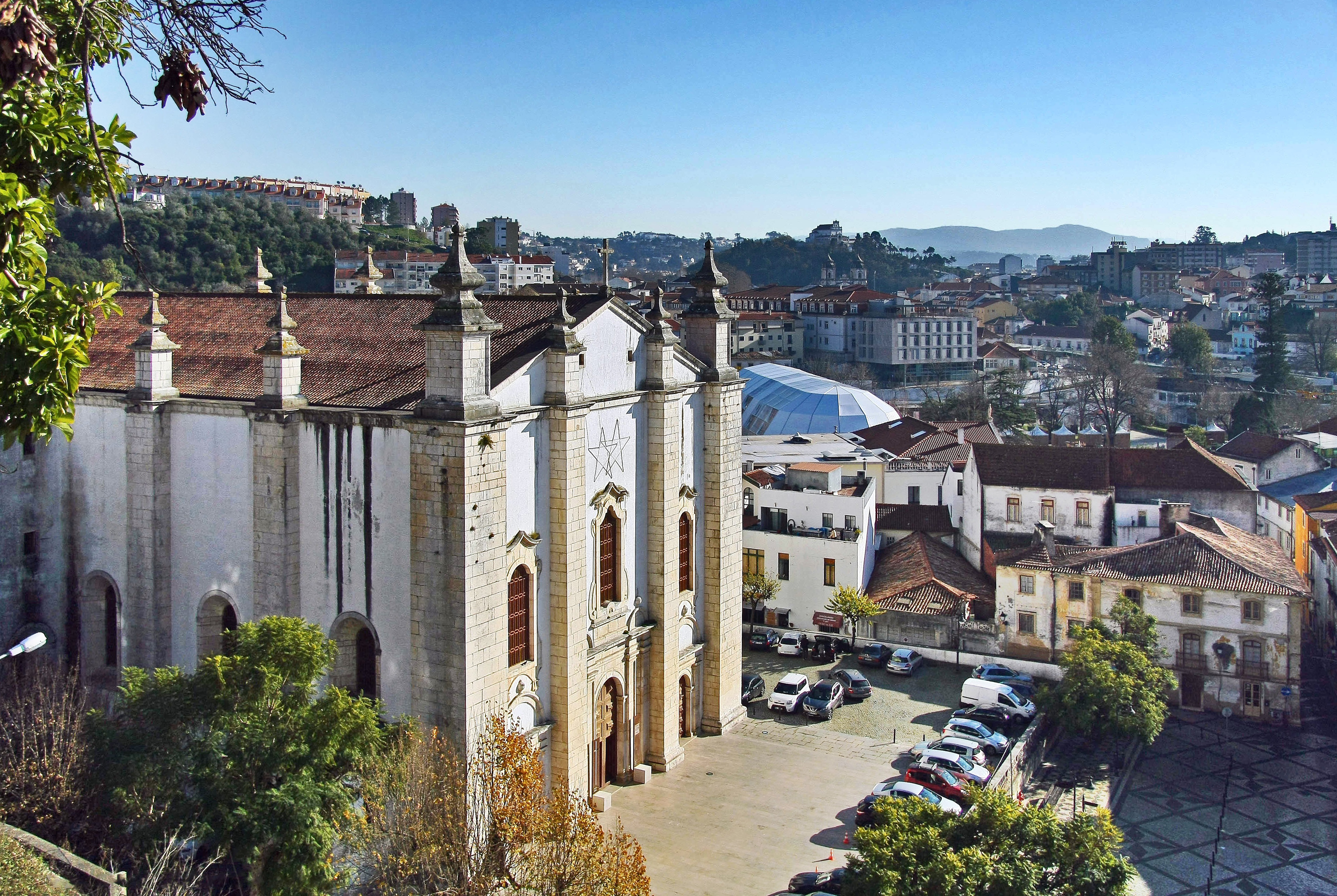
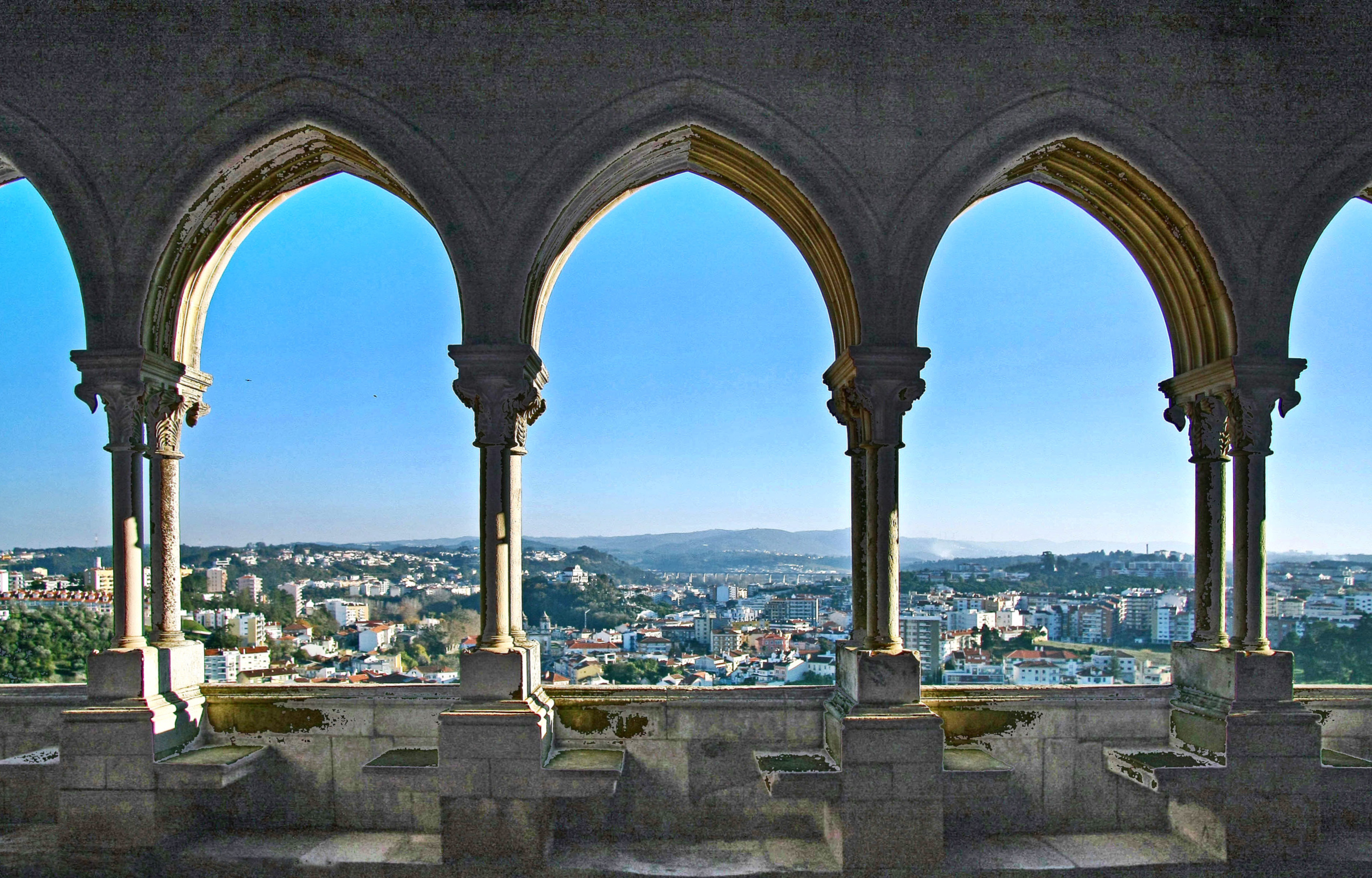
- Left to right, from top: Leiria Belltower {pt} from Largo da Sé, the Castle as seen from Downtown, Leiria Castle, Leiria Cathedral (See) and view of the city from the castle arches

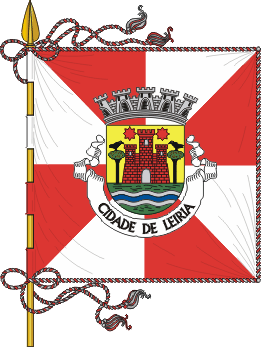
- Flag Coat of arms
- Interactive map of Leiria
- Location within Portugal
- Coordinates: 39°45′N 8°48′W
- Country: Portugal
- Region: Central Portugal
- Intermunicipal community: Region of Leiria
- District: Leiria
- Historical province: Beira Litoral (1936 map)/ Estremadura (pre-1832)

Government
  - Type: Municipality (LAU)
  - Body: Câmara Municipal (executive); Municipal Assembly (deliberative)
  - President (2025-2029): Gonçalo Lopes (PS)
  - President of the Assembly: Acácio de Sousa (PS)

Area
  - Total: 565.09 km^{2} (218.18 sq mi)
  - City-proper (INE): 58.65 km^{2} (22.64 sq mi)

Population (2021)
  - Total: 128,640
  - Density: 227.65/km^{2} (589.60/sq mi)
  - City-proper (INE): 55,074
  - City-proper (INE) density: 939.0/km^{2} (2,432/sq mi)
- Demonym(s): leiriense, leirense, colipolense
- Time zone: UTC+00:00 (WET)
  - Summer (DST): UTC+01:00 (WEST)
- Postal code: 2400
- Area code: 244
- Dicofre code: 1009
- Patron saint: Our Lady of the Incarnation
- Municipal holiday: 22 May (Original creation of diocese)
- Website: www.cm-leiria.pt

Leiria (European Portuguese pronunciation: [lɐjˈɾi.ɐ]) is a city and municipality in the Central Region of Portugal. It is the second largest city in that same region, after Coimbra, with a municipality population of 128,640 (as of 2021) in an area of 565.09 square kilometres (218.18 sq mi). It is the seat of its own district and the Roman Catholic Diocese of Leiria-Fátima. The city is part of the historical province of Beira Litoral.

== History ==
The region around Leiria has long been inhabited although its early history is uncertain. The first evident inhabitants were the Turduli Oppidani, a Celtici tribe (akin to the Lusitanians), who established a settlement near (around 7 km) present-day Leiria. This settlement was later occupied by the Romans, who expanded it under the original Celtiberian name Collippo. The stones of the ancient Roman town were used in the Middle Ages to build much of Leiria.

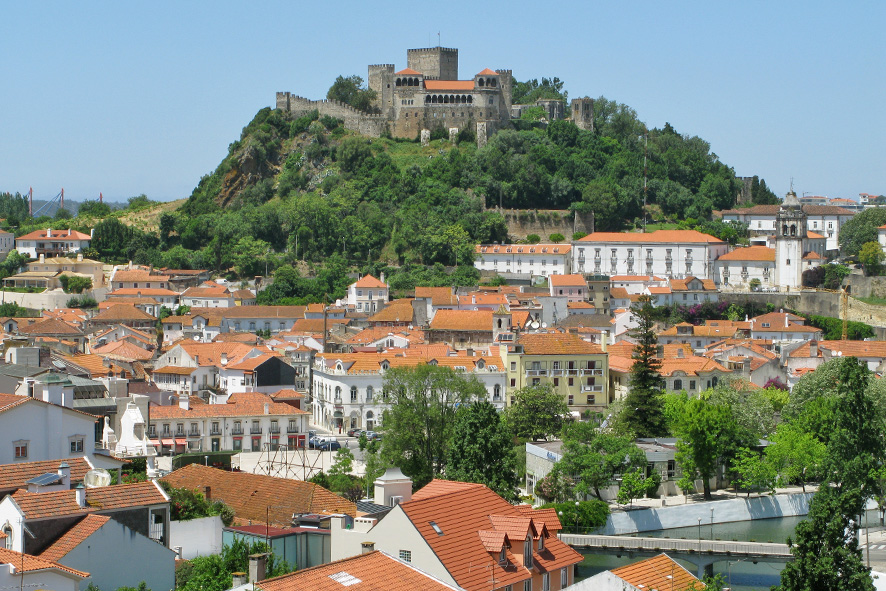
Leiria and its Castle.

The name "Leiria" in Portuguese derives from 'leira' (from the medieval Galician-Portuguese form 'laria', from proto-Celtic *ɸlār-yo-, akin to English 'floor(ing)', Old Irish 'làr' 'ground, floor', Breton 'leur' 'ground', Welsh 'llawr' 'floor') meaning an area with small farming plots. It was occupied by the Suebi in 414 until they were forced by the Romans to retreat to Galicia and later incorporated by Leovigild into the Visigoths kingdom in 585 A.D. Later the Moors occupied the area until it was re-captured by the first King of Portugal, Afonso Henriques in 1135, during the Reconquista.

South of Leiria in that period was the so-called no-man's land, until regions further south (like Santarém and Lisbon) were permanently taken and re-populated by the Christians. In 1142 King Afonso Henriques gave Leiria its first foral (compilation of feudal rights) to stimulate the colonisation of the region.

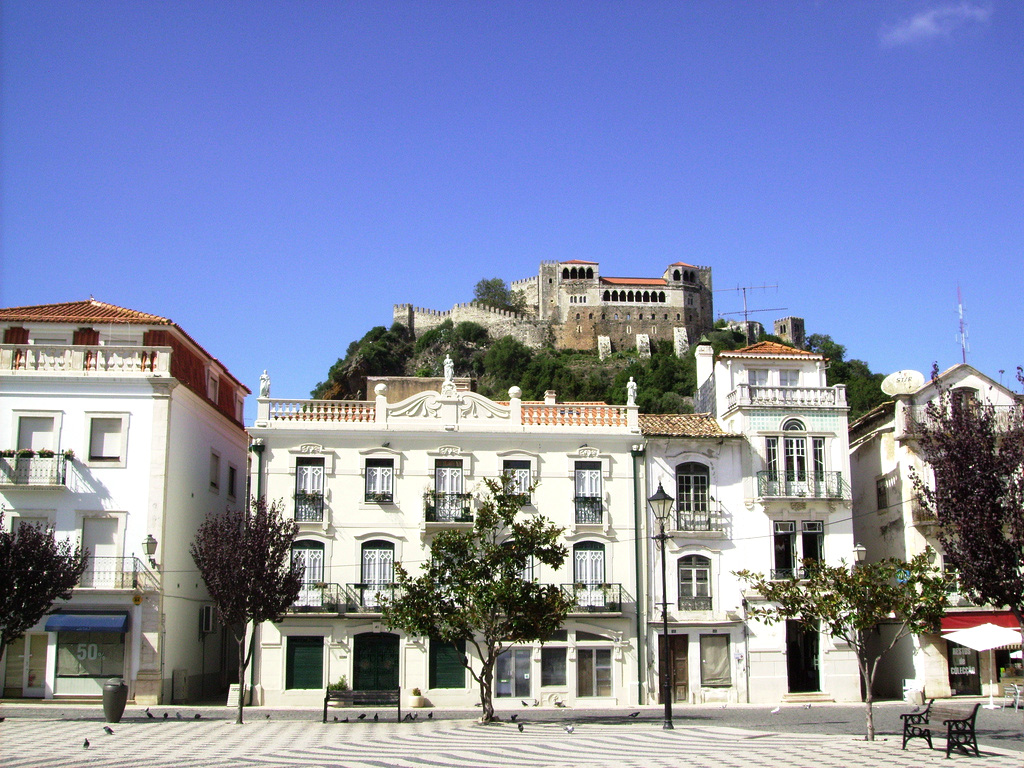
Main square and Leiria Castle uphill

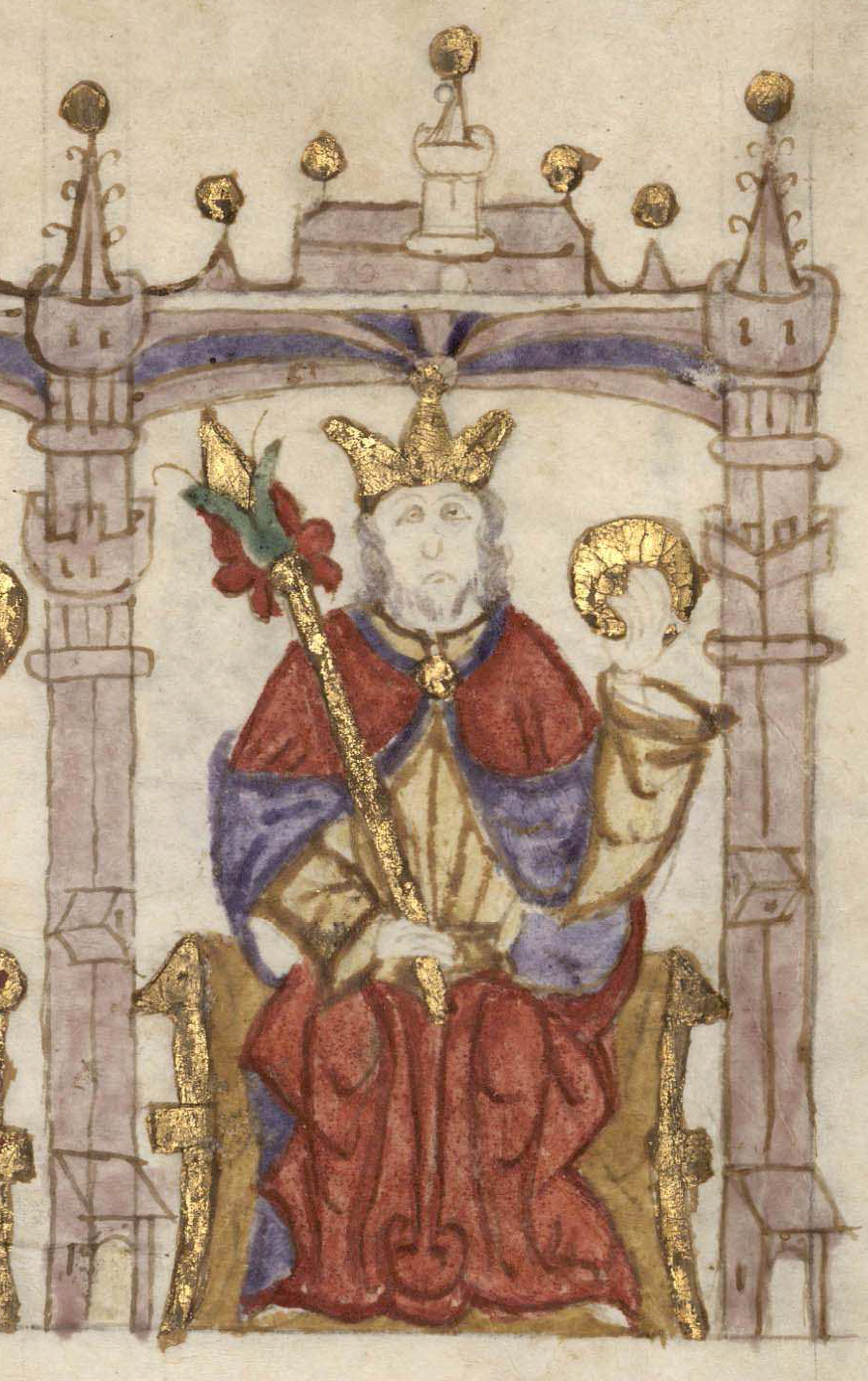
Denis of Portugal, the King troubadour, closely linked to Leiria region

Both Afonso I of Portugal and Sancho I rebuilt the walls and the Leiria Castle to avoid new enemy incursions. Most of the population lived inside the protective city walls, but already in the 12th century part of the population lived outside the walls. The oldest church of Leiria, the Church of Saint Peter (Igreja de São Pedro), built in romanesque style in the last quarter of the 12th century, served the parish located outside the walls.

During the Middle Ages the importance of the village increased, and it was the setting of several cortes (feudal parliaments). The first of the cortes held in Leiria took place in 1245, under King Afonso II.

In the early 14th century, King Denis of Portugal restored the keep tower of the citadel of the castle, as can be seen in an inscription in the tower. He also built a royal residence in Leiria (now lost), and lived for long periods in the town, which he donated as feud to his wife, Elizabeth of Portugal (Rainha Isabel d'Aragāo).

The king also ordered the expansion of the famous Pine Forest of Leiria (Pinhal de Leiria) along the Atlantic coastline. Later, the timbers from this forest would prove indispensable to build the ships used in the Portuguese Navigations of the 15th and 16th centuries.

In the late 14th century, King John I built a royal palace within the walls of the castle of Leiria. This palace, with elegant gothic galleries that offered wonderful views of the town and surrounding landscape, was totally in ruins but was partially rebuilt in the 20th century.

John I also sponsored the rebuilding in late gothic style of the old Church of Our Lady of the Rock (Igreja de Nossa Senhora da Pedra), located inside the castle.

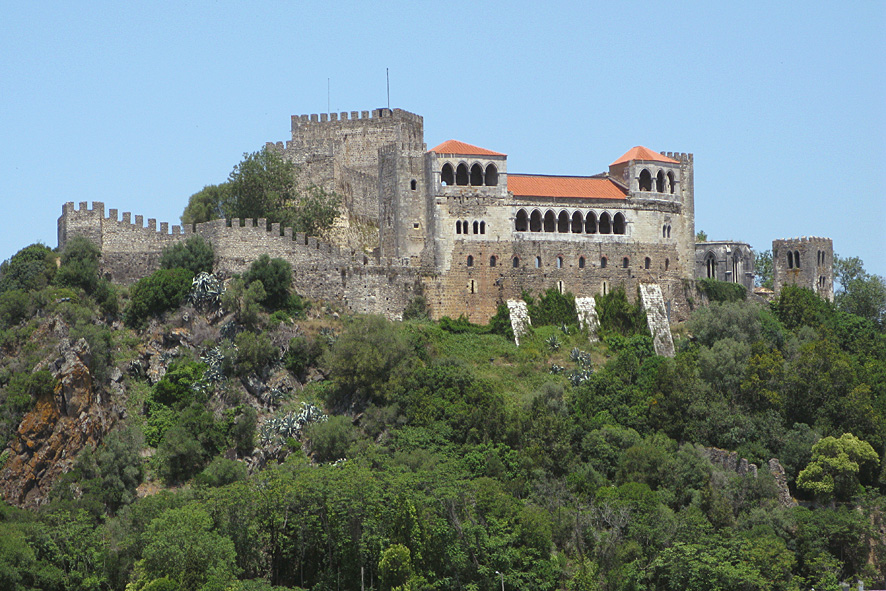
Leiria Castle.

Towards the end of the 15th century the town continued to grow, occupying the area from the castle hill down to the river Lis. King Manuel I gave it a new foral in 1510, and, in 1545, it was elevated to the category of city and became see of a diocese.

The Cathedral of Leiria was built in the second half of the 16th century in a mix of late manueline and mannerist styles.

Compared to the Middle Ages, the subsequent history of Leiria is of relative decay. The city was stormed by the Peninsular War, namely in the French Invasions of 1808 (the killing of Portela, by the troops of Gen. Margaron) and the Great Fire of 1811, caused by the Napoleonic troops retreating from the Lines of Torres Vedras.

In the 20th century, however, its strategic position in the Portuguese territory favoured the development of a diversified industry.

In January 2026, Storm Kristin caused a catastrophic impact in the municipality of Leiria, with losses exceeding €1 billion.

== Geography ==
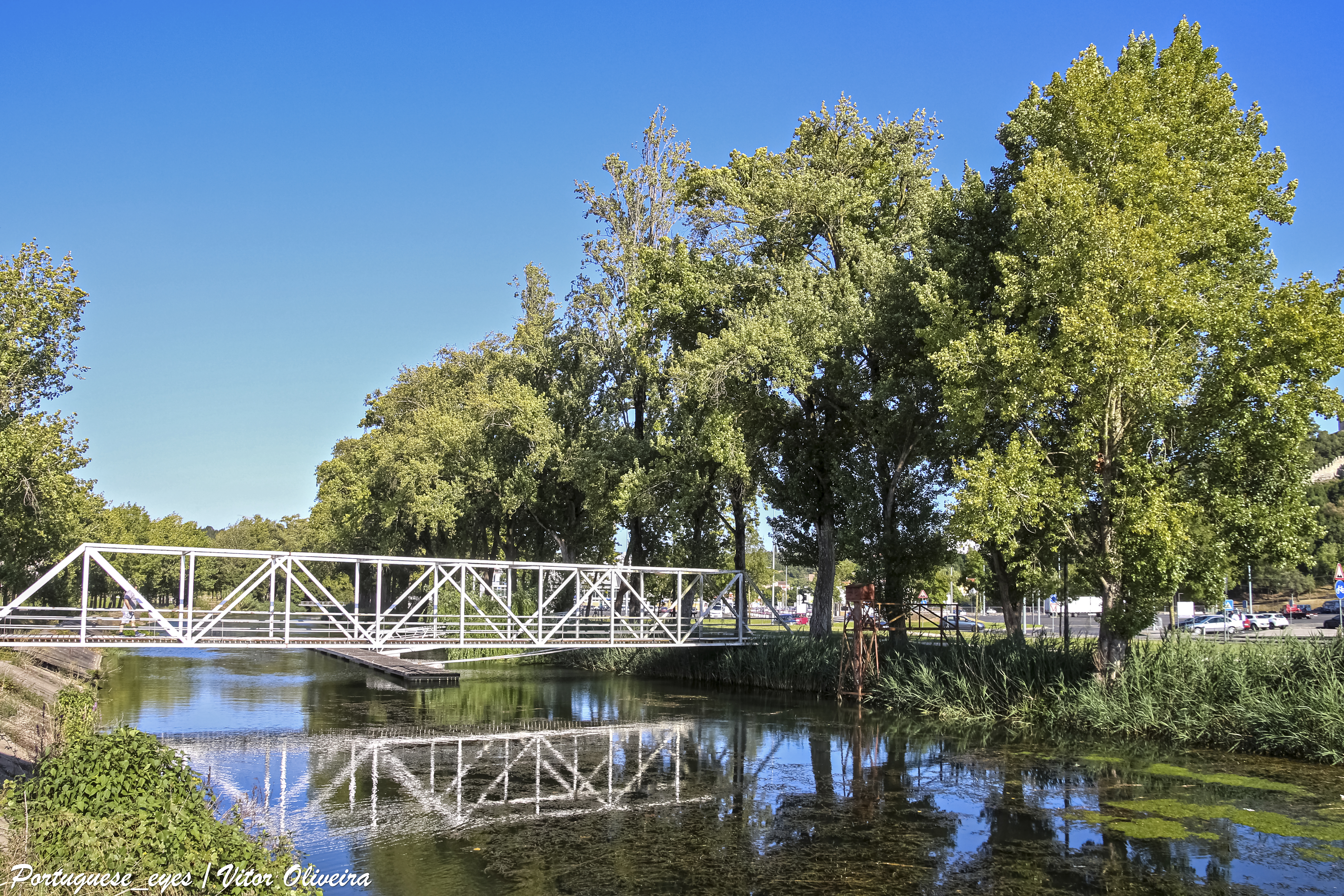
The Lis River crossing Leiria

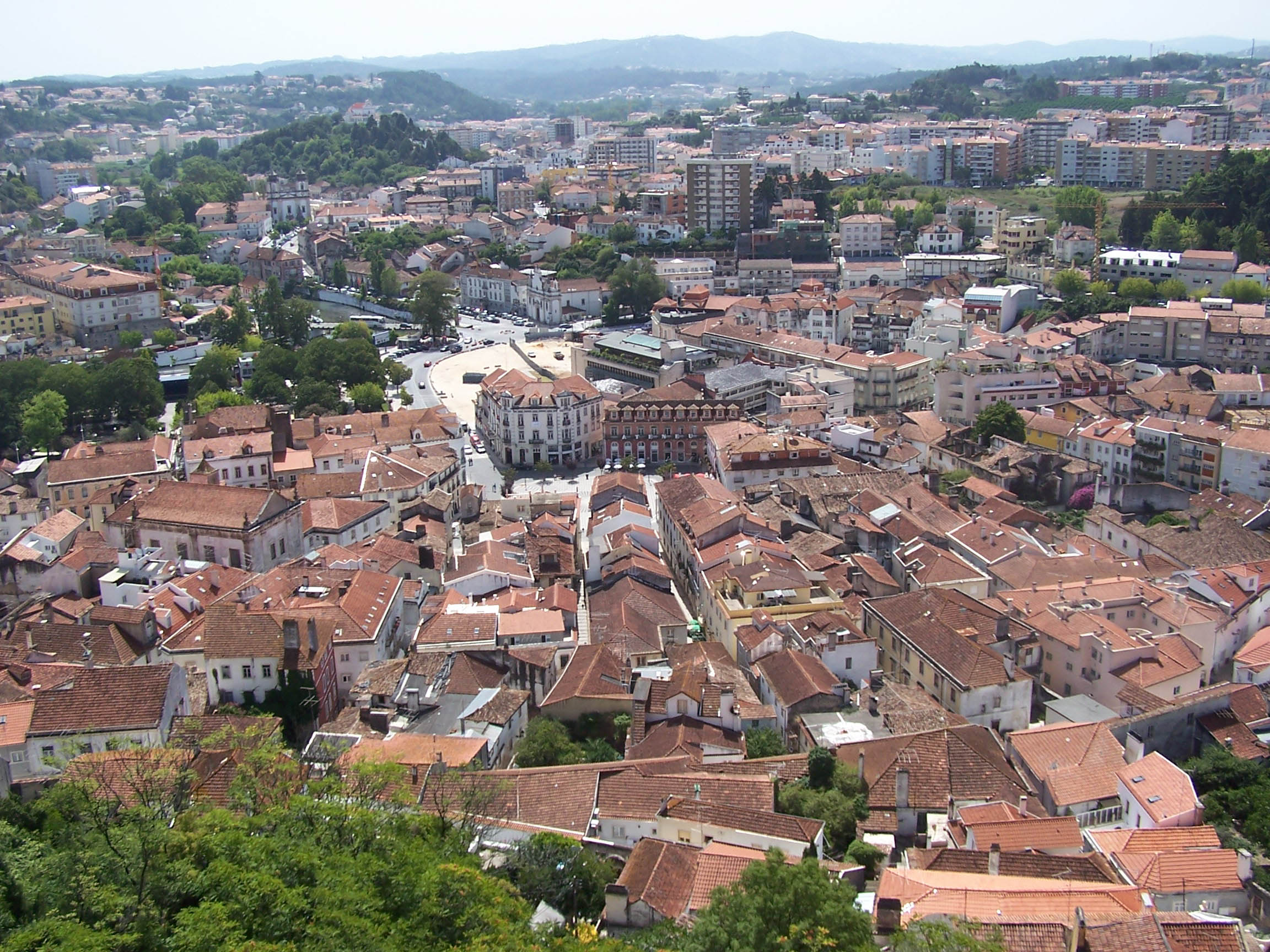
Leiria seen from its castle

Leiria is located in western Central Portugal. The municipality borders the Atlantic Ocean to the northwest, Marinha Grande to the west, Alcobaça to the southwest, Batalha to the south, Ourém to the southeast, and Pombal to the north and northeast. The city is located about halfway between Lisbon and Porto. The distance to Lisbon is 137 kilometres (85 miles), to Coimbra 70 kilometres (43 miles) and to Porto 177 kilometres (110 miles). The historic city centre spreads between the castle hill and the river Lis.

Leiria is also the seat of its own sub-region, Região de Leiria, which includes the cities of Marinha Grande, Pombal as well the municipalities/town seats of Batalha, Alcobaça and Porto de Mós located nearby.

=== Climate ===
The city of Leiria has a Mediterranean climate (Köppen: Csb) with warm, dry summers and mild, wet winters. Its location near the Atlantic coast keeps temperature variation relatively minimal. The average annual temperature is around 15 °C (59 °F), varying between 10 °C (50 °F) in January, to 20 °C (68 °F) in August.

Winters are mild and wet. On average, around 50% of the days receive some form of precipitation in this season. Average temperatures range between 15 °C (59 °F) during the day and 6 °C (43 °F) at night and can go below 0 °C (32 °F) on colder days, with an average of 15 days with frost per year.

Springs are pleasant, but usually rainy during the month of April. This season, though wet, is slightly drier than winter, with the majority of days receiving no precipitation. Average temperatures range between 19 °C (66 °F) at day and 10 °C (50 °F) at night.

Summers bring high temperatures and sunshine. Precipitation, when present, mostly occurs in the form of drizzle, and accounts for only around 20% of days between June and September. Sunshine hours reach their maximum in August (which is sunny 70% of the time). Average temperatures range between 25 °C (77 °F) at day and 15 °C (59 °F) at night, the maximum can exceed 35 °C (95 °F) on hotter days.

Autumn, although mild, is the rainiest season of the year. Average temperatures range between 19 °C (66 °F) and 10 °C (50 °F).

Snowfalls in the city typically occur once every 20 to 30 years. The last time it snowed in Leiria was on 29 January 2006, during which the temperature peaked at −3 °C (27 °F). The highest temperature recorded was 42.3 °C (108.1 °F) on 4 August 2018.

Climate data for Leiria (Monte Real Air Base), 1971-2000, altitude: 32 m (105 ft)
Month	Jan	Feb	Mar	Apr	May	Jun	Jul	Aug	Sep	Oct	Nov	Dec	Year
Record high °C (°F)	21.2 (70.2)	24.4 (75.9)	28.3 (82.9)	29.6 (85.3)	35.7 (96.3)	42.3 (108.1)	39.0 (102.2)	39.5 (103.1)	39.4 (102.9)	34.0 (93.2)	27.4 (81.3)	24.0 (75.2)	42.3 (108.1)
Mean daily maximum °C (°F)	14.3 (57.7)	15.3 (59.5)	17.3 (63.1)	18.1 (64.6)	19.8 (67.6)	22.8 (73.0)	24.9 (76.8)	25.1 (77.2)	24.4 (75.9)	21.1 (70.0)	17.4 (63.3)	15.1 (59.2)	19.6 (67.3)
Daily mean °C (°F)	9.6 (49.3)	10.7 (51.3)	12.3 (54.1)	13.5 (56.3)	15.5 (59.9)	18.2 (64.8)	20.0 (68.0)	20.1 (68.2)	19.1 (66.4)	16.2 (61.2)	12.8 (55.0)	10.8 (51.4)	14.9 (58.8)
Mean daily minimum °C (°F)	4.9 (40.8)	6.1 (43.0)	7.2 (45.0)	8.9 (48.0)	11.1 (52.0)	13.6 (56.5)	15.2 (59.4)	15.1 (59.2)	13.9 (57.0)	11.3 (52.3)	8.2 (46.8)	6.5 (43.7)	10.2 (50.3)
Record low °C (°F)	−5.6 (21.9)	−4.0 (24.8)	−2.6 (27.3)	0.0 (32.0)	3.8 (38.8)	5.0 (41.0)	8.6 (47.5)	8.4 (47.1)	4.4 (39.9)	−1.2 (29.8)	−2.5 (27.5)	−4.0 (24.8)	−5.6 (21.9)
Average rainfall mm (inches)	101.2 (3.98)	92.9 (3.66)	59.7 (2.35)	72.6 (2.86)	64.0 (2.52)	23.6 (0.93)	8.5 (0.33)	10.6 (0.42)	36.0 (1.42)	92.7 (3.65)	110.8 (4.36)	118.1 (4.65)	790.7 (31.13)
Average rainy days (≥ 0.1 mm)	14.5	14.5	12.5	14.4	11.9	8.2	5.6	5.0	8.2	13.3	14.0	15.8	137.9
Average relative humidity (%) (at 9 AM)	95	88	89	79	78	77	79	81	85	87	89	90	85
Mean monthly sunshine hours	148.1	140.9	205.1	213.7	242.7	262.5	285.7	281.8	225.9	186.9	148.0	128.3	2,469.6
Percentage possible sunshine	49	47	55	54	54	58	63	66	61	54	49	44	55
Source: Instituto Português do Mar e da Atmosfera

Climate data for Leiria (Alcobaça), 1991–2020, altitude: 36 m (118 ft)
Month	Jan	Feb	Mar	Apr	May	Jun	Jul	Aug	Sep	Oct	Nov	Dec	Year
Record high °C (°F)	23.7 (74.7)	25.0 (77.0)	29.8 (85.6)	33.0 (91.4)	35.3 (95.5)	40.1 (104.2)	40.0 (104.0)	42.8 (109.0)	38.5 (101.3)	35.0 (95.0)	28.3 (82.9)	23.7 (74.7)	42.8 (109.0)
Mean daily maximum °C (°F)	15.3 (59.5)	16.3 (61.3)	18.5 (65.3)	19.7 (67.5)	22.1 (71.8)	24.6 (76.3)	26.1 (79.0)	27.0 (80.6)	25.9 (78.6)	22.9 (73.2)	18.2 (64.8)	16.1 (61.0)	21.1 (69.9)
Daily mean °C (°F)	9.7 (49.5)	10.4 (50.7)	12.7 (54.9)	14.0 (57.2)	16.3 (61.3)	18.9 (66.0)	20.5 (68.9)	20.9 (69.6)	19.4 (66.9)	16.7 (62.1)	12.5 (54.5)	10.6 (51.1)	15.2 (59.4)
Mean daily minimum °C (°F)	4.0 (39.2)	4.5 (40.1)	6.8 (44.2)	8.2 (46.8)	10.4 (50.7)	13.1 (55.6)	14.9 (58.8)	14.8 (58.6)	13.0 (55.4)	10.5 (50.9)	6.9 (44.4)	5.2 (41.4)	9.4 (48.8)
Record low °C (°F)	−6.7 (19.9)	−6.2 (20.8)	−5.2 (22.6)	−0.5 (31.1)	1.0 (33.8)	4.7 (40.5)	7.3 (45.1)	6.0 (42.8)	3.5 (38.3)	0.2 (32.4)	−5.6 (21.9)	−5.8 (21.6)	−6.7 (19.9)
Average precipitation mm (inches)	112.6 (4.43)	81.7 (3.22)	74.1 (2.92)	83.2 (3.28)	61.8 (2.43)	18.8 (0.74)	7.5 (0.30)	12.7 (0.50)	38.1 (1.50)	102.5 (4.04)	127.8 (5.03)	104.4 (4.11)	825.2 (32.5)
Average precipitation days (≥ 1 mm)	11.7	8.9	9.3	10.0	7.7	3.6	1.5	2.0	4.9	9.8	11.8	11.0	92.2
Average relative humidity (%)	78	76	71	69	68	69	68	67	69	73	77	78	72
Source: Instituto Português do Mar e da Atmosfera

=== Parishes ===
Administratively, the municipality is divided into 18 civil parishes (freguesias):

- Amor
- Arrabal
- Bajouca
- Bidoeira de Cima
- Caranguejeira
- Coimbrão
- Colmeias e Memória
- Leiria, Pousos, Barreira e Cortes
- Maceira
- Marrazes e Barosa
- Milagres
- Monte Real e Carvide
- Monte Redondo e Carreira
- Parceiros e Azoia
- Regueira de Pontes
- Santa Catarina da Serra e Chainça
- Santa Eufémia e Boa Vista
- Souto da Carpalhosa e Ortigosa

== Politics ==
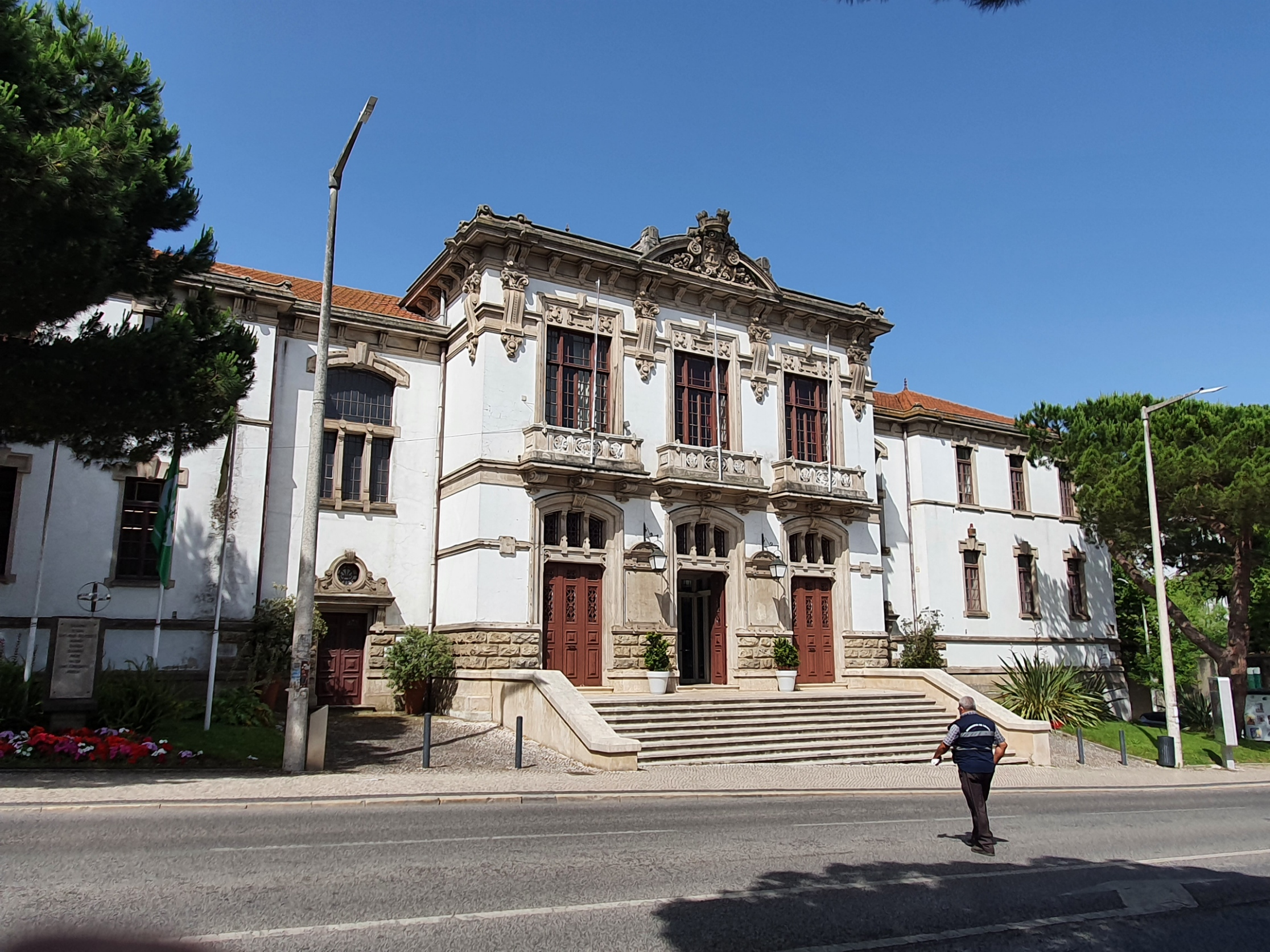
Leiria City Hall, the seat of Leiria's municipal government

Composition of Leiria city council (2025–2029): PS (7) PSD (3) CH (1)

Gonçalo Lopes took office as the Mayor of Leiria on 26 August 2019, after the resignation of his predecessor. He was re-elected following the 2025 local elections.

=== Local election results 1976–2025 ===
Parties are listed from left-wing to right-wing.

Summary of local elections for Leiria city hall, 1976–2025
Election	PCP APU CDU	BE	L	PAN	PS	PRD	IND	PSD	CDS	PPM	IL	CH	O/I	Turnout
1976	5.3				24.4			37.4	25.4				7.5	65.2
1979	7.3				17.7			39.9	30.7				4.4	71.1
1982	7.5				20.6			31.0	37.2				3.7	66.7
1985	5.7				10.6	4.6		30.9	45.0				3.2	60.9
1989	3.9				29.2			45.2	17.4				4.3	59.4
1993	3.9				33.3			39.1	17.9				5.8	61.6
1997	2.8				38.4			43.4	8.6	2.3			4.5	63.2
2001	2.0	0.9			20.9		9.9	52.0	9.7				4.6	61.4
2005	2.5	3.4			35.5			42.6	9.3				6.7	62.0
2009	2.4	3.4			44.9			37.6	7.7				4.0	59.4
2013	4.4	3.3			46.3			27.9	4.7				13.4	49.8
2017	2.4	2.7		2.2	54.5			27.0	5.0				6.2	54.6
2021	2.5	2.4	0.7	1.8	52.5			22.4	4.2		2.4	5.7	5.4	53.2
2025	1.5	1.5			54.1			21.8	2.0		3.7	11.5	3.9	60.0
Source: Marktest

== Demographics ==
Demographic evolution of Leiria
1801	1849	1900	1930	1960	1981	1991	2001	2011	2021
37,930	29,803	54,422	55,234	82,988	96,517	102,762	119,847	126,879	128,640

== Culture ==
In addition to being a site of historical interest, the castle of Leiria provides a venue for cultural events. Nearby is the Church of Saint Peter (Igreja de São Pedro), the site of the city's annual music festival. Leiria is home to the Museu da imagem em movimento (Museum of the Moving Image) as well as Portugal's restored first paper mill, Moinho do Papel (The Paper Mill), the Theatre Miguel Franco in the Mercado de Sant'Ana (Saint Anne's Market) and the Theatre José Lúcio da Silva are venues for theatrical, musical, cinematic and dance performances.

Today the central square, Praça Francisco Rodrigues Lobo, named after the Portuguese poet Francisco Rodrigues Lobo, is home to a thriving café culture, regularly used for cultural events. The city was the principal residence of the Portuguese king, Denis, who wrote lyric poetry in the troubadour tradition, and briefly the home of the modern realist writer Eça de Queiroz, whose first novel, O Crime do Padre Amaro ("Father Amaro's Sin"), published in 1875, is set in the city.

In October 2012, Leiria opened the city's "Centro Cívico", a modern architecture building, designed to have social impact on the community. This building has the life of Eça de Queiroz as a theme. In here, there's senior classes and Associação Fazer Avançar runs SPEAK, with support from EDP and Calouste Gulbenkian Foundation, among others.

The city has several cultural entities such as Leiria's Public Library Afonso Lopes Vieira, Arquivo, Ateneu, Leirena and O Nariz (theatre groups), Associação Fazer Avançar, Fade In, Metamorfose, Eco, and many others.

In recent years, Leiria has seen much redevelopment on the banks of the Lis River, with the creation of several new parks, public spaces, children's play areas, skateboard parks and a series of themed bridges. A long riverside promenade was built which is popular with walkers and joggers.

Since 2010, Associação FADE IN organizes ENTREMURALHAS, one of the most important gothic festivals in the world (List of gothic festivals).

=== Gastronomy ===
Leiria's gastronomy offers a good variety of Portuguese dishes including fresh fish dishes and the famous "Leitão" da Boavista (barbecued piglet/ suckling pig). The nearby village of Cortes is known for "Migas", a dish of corn bread with spinach, garlic and olive oil which is eaten as an accompaniment to fish or meat.

Typical Dishes: Morcela de Arroz; Lentriscas; Bacalhoada com migas; Bacalhau com feijão frade; Ossinhos; Fritada; Cabrito; Feijoada; Leitão; Chanfana; Fritada dos peixinhos; Bacalhau com Chícharos.

Traditional sweet pastry: Brisas do Lis; Lampreia de Ovos; Ovos Folhados; Bolinhos de Pinhão; Tarte de Chícharos (Alvaiázere); Canudos de Leiria; Doce de amêndoa; Broas Doces de Batata; Merendeiras dos Santos; Filhós de abóbora.

Wines of the region: Caves Vidigal, S.A./ Vale da Mata, Cortes / Quinta da Serrinha (Vin Bio), Barreira / Santos & Santos, Torres Vedras / Quinta da Sapeira, Serra d'Aire / Paço Côrtes, Lda. IGP Lisboa, Sub-região Alta Estremadura. These wines are labeled D.O.C. (Denominação de Origem Controlada) which secures a superior quality. Also parte of the Portuguese wine region Encostas de Aire (DOC).

=== Panoramic view ===
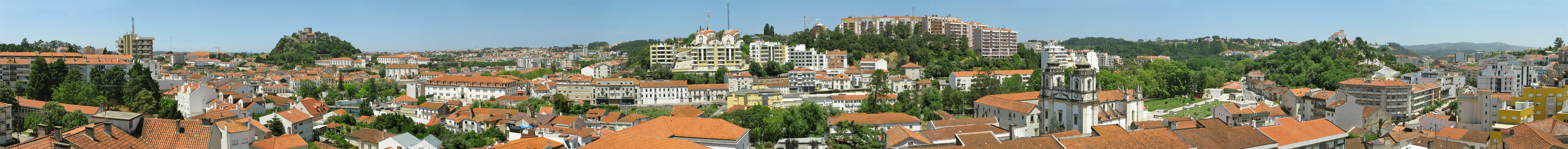
Panorama of Leiria

=== City symbols ===
Like other territories in the country, its main symbols are those used by the municipality - the coat of arms and the flag.

The municipal coat of arms are described as "or, a castle gules, open and illuminated argent, accompanied by two pinetrees vert, fruited or and detailed sable, all on a terrace vert. The pinetrees are topped each by a crow sable, turned toward the centre. The central tower is accompanied in chief by two eight-pointed stars, gules. At the base, three small wavy strips of argent and azure. Mural crown of five towers argent. White banner with the sayings "CIDADE DE LEIRIA" in sable.

The arms as they exist today were approved in 1987, alongside the flag and seal, as an update from the middle of the century, although many of the pieces in the design date from further back. An older version of the arms was reported as featuring just a singular pine-tree topped by a crow. In 1865, historian Vilhena Barbosa [pt] notes that the central pieces (the castle, crows and pines) are related to a local legend relating to the conquest of Leiria - near the Portuguese camp, a crow landed on top of a large pine tree which cawed and beat its wings continuously. When the attack was ordered, the bird continued stronger still, which was considered a good sign by the Portuguese, which took the well-defended fortification swiftly. His document also describes the shield as argent, rather than the currently adopted golden colour.

Leiria's heraldic arms are placed at the centre of its municipal flag, like all municipalities in Portugal. Its design consists of a red and white gyronny. When used in its ceremonial standard version, it includes cords and tassles which should be coloured in gules and argent, and placed on a golden pole and spear.

Another symbol commonly associated with Leiria is the fleur-de-lys, after the River Lis which now crosses the city and the remainder of its municipal territory. It appeared on the arms of the former civil parish of Leiria.

== Economy ==
Leiria has an economy concentrated on services and light industries. It has several industries related with plastics and moulds, as well as animal food, milling, cement, and civil construction, among others. Agriculture, tourism, and state-run public services, such as education (including the Polytechnical Institute of Leiria), health (the district hospital Hospital de Santo André) and general public administration, are an important part of Leiria's economy.

Monte Real Air Base, a major Military airbase of the Portuguese Air Force in Monte Real, where all Portuguese F16 fighter squadrons are stationed, is also notable employer in the region.

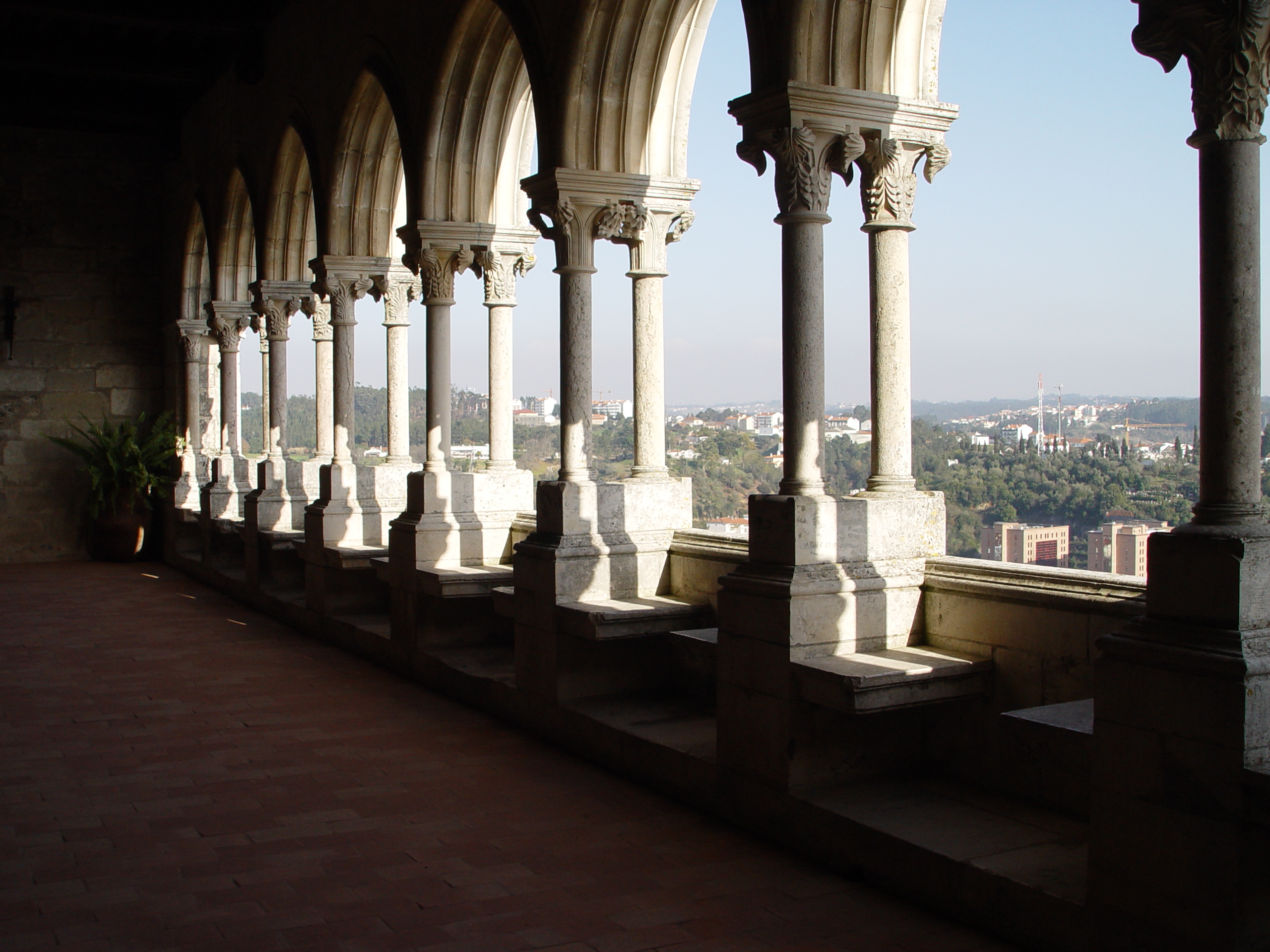
Gothic gallery in the Castle of Leiria.

== Transport ==
Leiria is connected to its suburbs and the rest of Portugal by a motorway network. There are four motorways passing the city;

- A1 - Auto-estrada do Norte linking Porto to Lisbon, passing by Leiria.
- A8 linking Leiria to Lisbon.
- A17 linking Marinha Grande to Aveiro.
- A19, linking Leiria and Batalha, using part of the IC2.

There is a railway Linha do Oeste (west railway line linking Cacém (Sintra/Lisbon area) to Figueira da Foz) which serves the central western coast of Portugal. Leiria railway station is a few km from the city centre (about 2 km).

The main bus station service is in the city centre. The bus service, called Mobilis, is composed by 9 lines connecting surrounding neighbourhoods and parishes of Leiria with the city centre. This includes two bus loops and a specific line (uMob) that connects the city centre with Campus 1 and 2 of the Instituto Politécnico de Leiria.

There is a small airfield (Aérodromo José Ferrinho), used for sports and recreation.

== Leiria-based newspapers ==
- Região de Leiria – Weekly
- Jornal de Leiria – Weekly
- Diário de Leiria – Daily
- O Mensageiro – Monthly - closed

== Education ==
Leiria hosts a national public polytechnic institution of higher education, the Instituto Politécnico de Leiria which has 5 campuses, 3 of them located in Leiria.

- Campus 1 - School of Education and Social Sciences (ESECS).
- Campus 2 - School of Technology and Management (ESTG) and the School Of Health Sciences (ESS)
- Campus 5 - Institute for Research, Development and Advanced Studies (INDEA), the Training Centre for the Courses of Technology Specialization (FOR.CET) with around 900 students, the Centre of New Opportunities (CNO), a Transfer Technology and Information Center (OTIC) and an E-Learning Unit (UED).

There is also a private institution, o Instituto Superior de Línguas e Administração (ISLA).

In Secondary education, Leiria has the following schools, the first two in the center, the last in the outskirts.

- Escola Secundária de Francisco Rodrigues Lobo (former Liceu)
- Escola Secundária de Domingos Sequeira (former Escola Comercial)
- Escola Secundária de Afonso Lopes Vieira, in Gândara dos Olivais, Marrazes.

In Primary education, Leiria has the following schools, teaching from the 5th grade until 9th grade.

- Escola D. Dinis
- Escola Correia Mateus (with 1st cycle)
- Escola José Saraiva
- Escola de Marrazes
- Colégio Dinis de Melo
- Colégio Senhor dos Milagres

Besides this there are multiple schools in the Municipality for the 1st cycle, from 1st grade until 4th grade.

== Sport ==
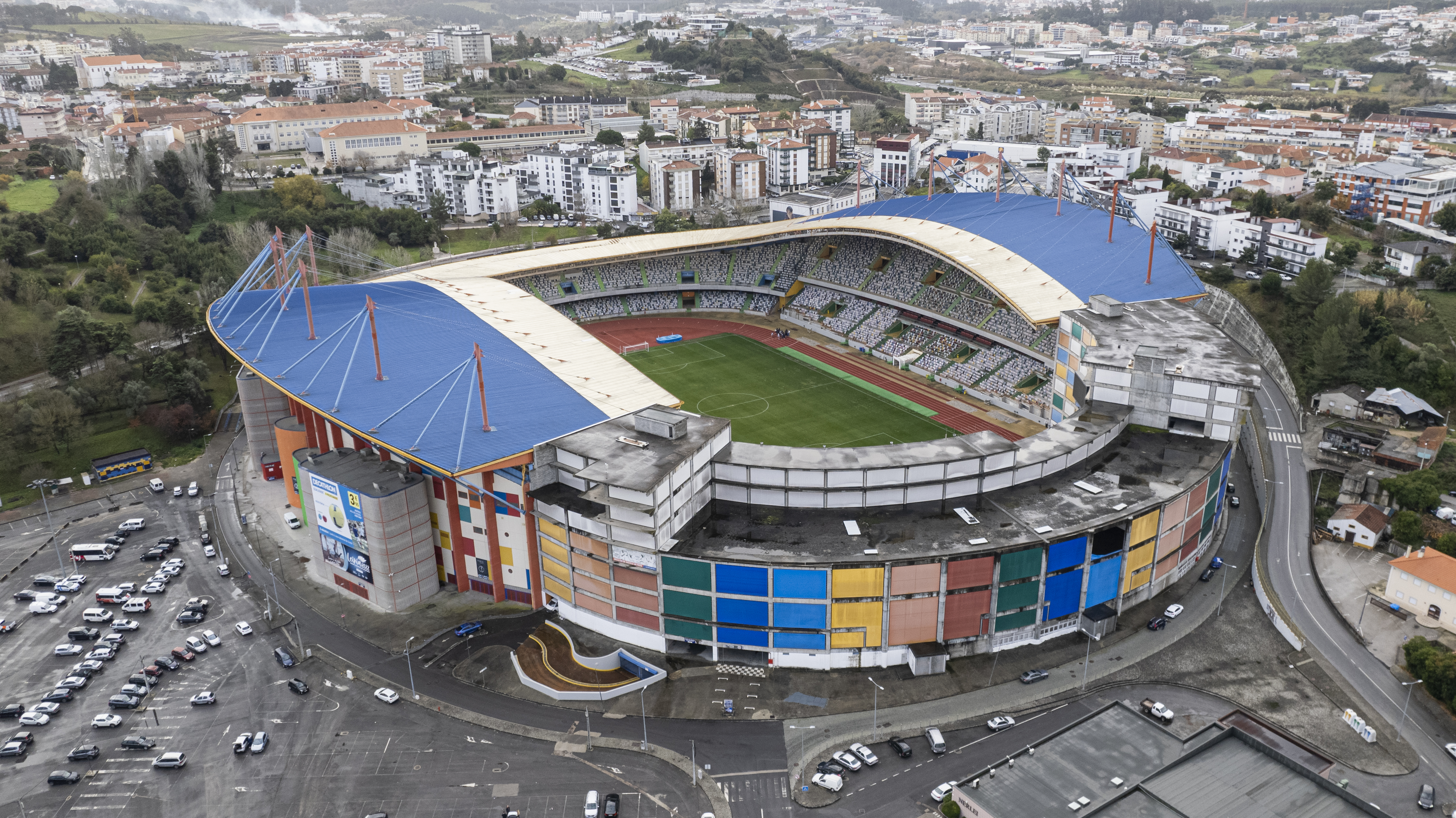
Stadium Dr. Magalhães Pessoa

The city of Leiria has its own football team, the União Desportiva de Leiria, commonly called just União de Leiria. It currently plays at the second level of Portuguese football, in Liga 2, but recently spent 16 seasons in the Primeira Liga.

An important facility is the Estádio Dr. Magalhães Pessoa, situated close to Leiria castle. The modern stadium has a capacity for 23,888 people and was built for the UEFA Euro 2004. Efforts were made to sell it, as its debt (nearly €50M) overburdens the city finances, União de Leiria rents the stadium, but played the 2011-12 season in Estádio Municipal da Marinha Grande due to a rent dispute.

The district football in Leiria is managed by the Leiria Football Association, overseeing the regional leagues.

Regarding other sports, Leiria has a notable women's handball team, Juve Lis, which plays in the Women's Handball League, and also participated in EHF competitions. Since 2013 Leiria has had a chess academy (Academia de Xadrez) offered as an activity for young people by the Corvos do Lis. Enrolled students have won titles in National Competitions: second place by teams under 12 years old in 2014 and 2015 and a National Champion, (Blitz, 2013, Under 8) and (Super Rapid play, 2015, under 10). They work with many primary schools in the region teaching chess, considering it a useful complement to developing intellectual skills.

Leiria also holds other facilities that can host different sport activities. They are Campo Futebol Aldeia do Desporto, Centro Nacional de Lançamentos, Pavilhão Gimnodesportivo dos Pousos (and adjacent Campo da Charneca), and Pavilhão do Lis. The latter was recognized by the Portuguese Paralympic Committee has the first paralympic inclusive venue of its kind in Portugal.

Leiria was chosen as one of the European Cities of Sport in 2022.

== International relations ==
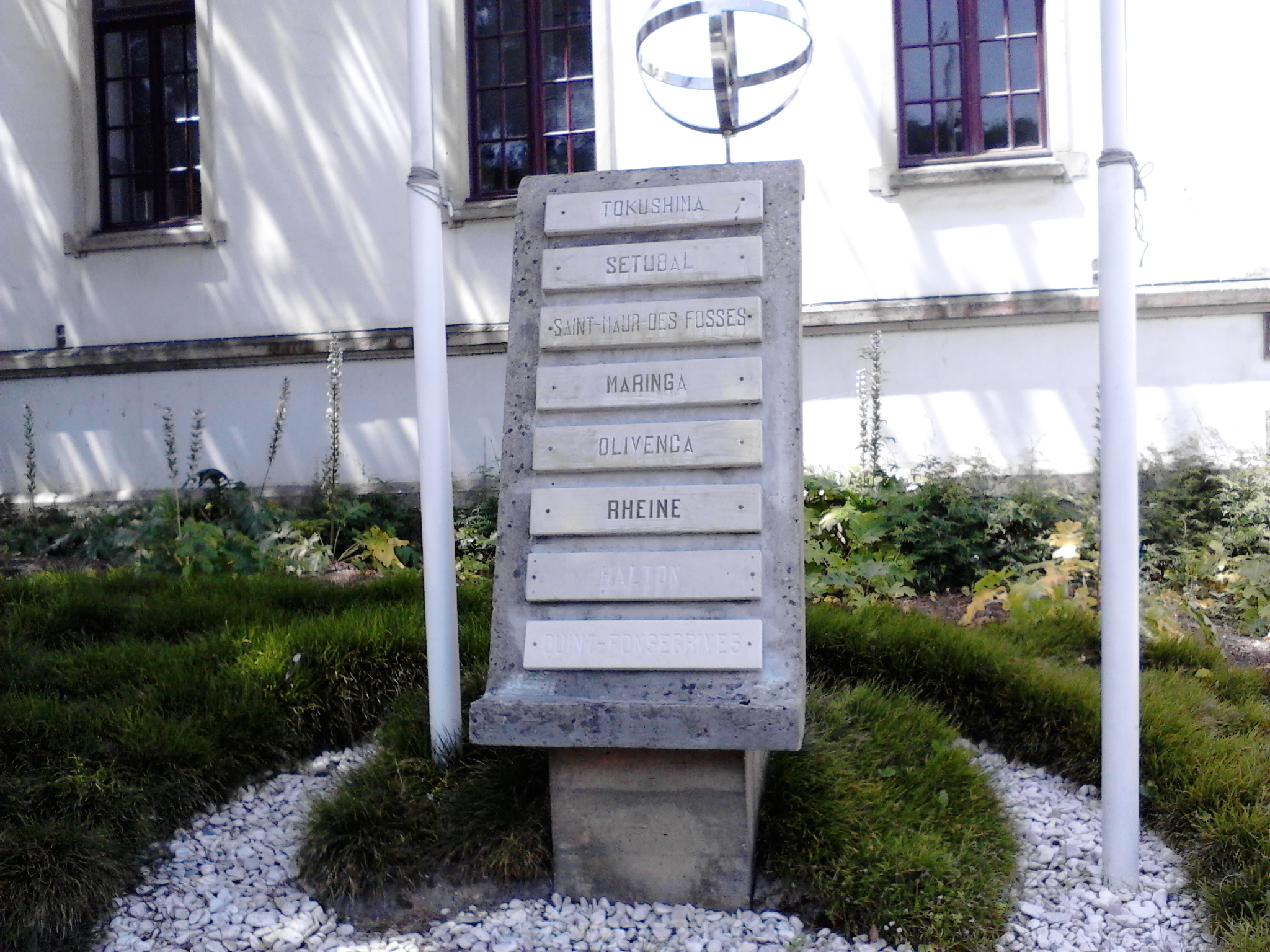
Monument of the twin cities in Leiria outside City Hall

According to the National Association of Portuguese Municipalities, Leiria is twinned with:

- Tokushima, Japan (since 1969)
- Setúbal, Portugal (since 1982)
- Saint-Maur-des-Fossés, France (since 1982)
- Maringá, Brazil (since 1982)
- Olivenza, Spain (since 1984)
- Olavarría, Argentina (since 1992)
- São Filipe, Cape Verde (since 1994)
- Rheine, Germany (since 1996)
- Halton, United Kingdom (since 1997)
- Tongling, China (since 1999)
- Nampula, Mozambique (since 2002)
- Quint-Fonsegrives, France (since 2010)
- Penglai, China (since 2014)

== Notable people ==
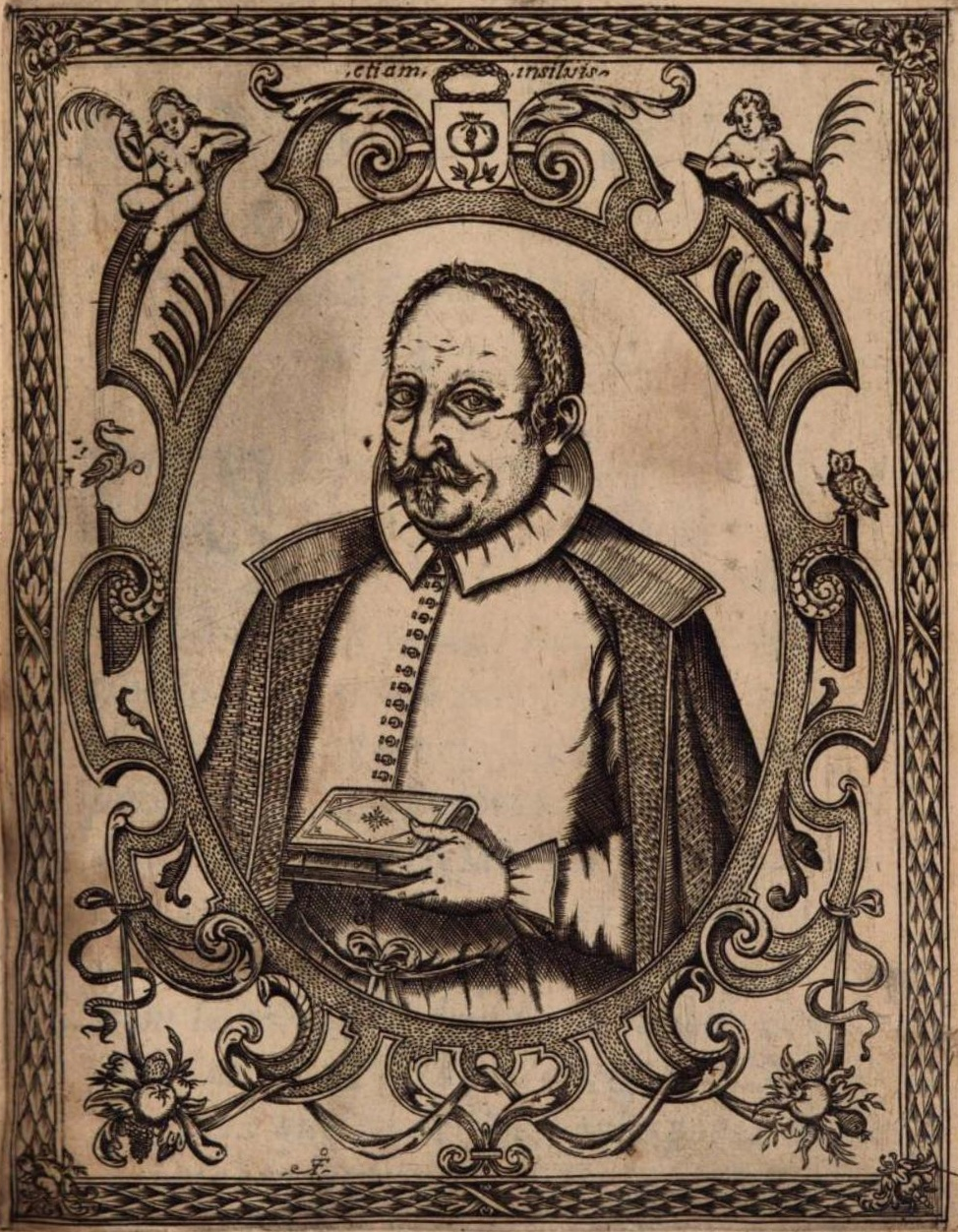
Francisco Rodrigues Lobo, 1619

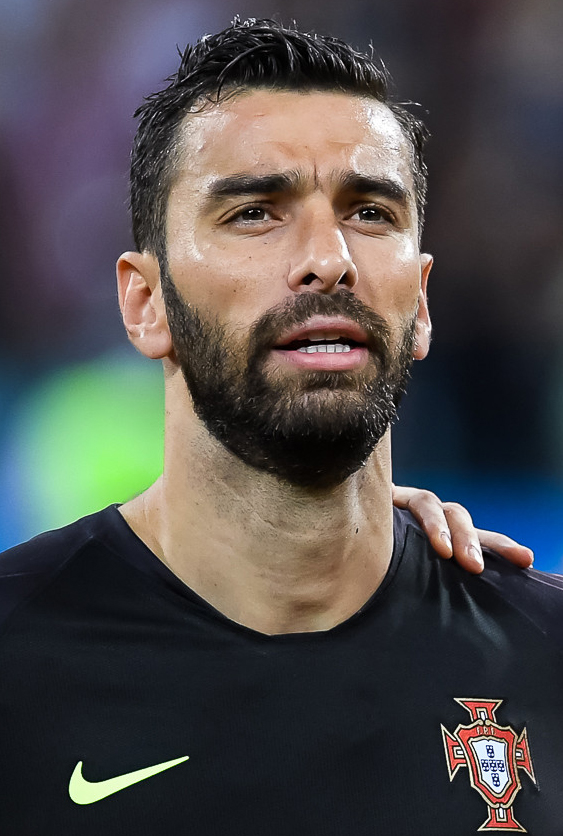
Rui Patrício, 2018

- António Casalinho (born 2003), Portuguese principal ballet dancer.
- Francisco Rodrigues Lobo (1580–1622), the Portuguese Theocritus, a poet and bucolic writer.
- Adriano Sousa Lopes (1879-1944), a Portuguese modernist painter and engraver
- Lino António (1898–1974), an artist using modernist frescoes, he made many friezes, frescos, stained glass and ceramic panels for public buildings
- Fabricio Soares (1918-1986), a Portuguese agronomist, he researched Black pod disease
- José Hermano Saraiva (1919–2012), a Portuguese professor, historian, jurist and TV personality
- António Campos (1922–1999), a pioneer filmmaker of visual anthropology.
- António Cardoso e Cunha (1933–2021), politician, Govt. minister & first European Commissioner.
- António-Pedro Vasconcelos (born 1939), a Portuguese film director.
- Joaquim Justino Carreira (1950−2013), Bishop of the Roman Catholic Diocese of Guarulhos, Brazil.
- José António Vieira da Silva (born 1953), a Portuguese politician and Govt. minister, 2015-2019
- António Lacerda Sales (born 1962), a Portuguese politician and Secretary of State, 2019-2022.
- David Fonseca (born 1973), a musician, singer-songwriter and photographer.
- Rúben de Almeida Barbeiro (born 1987), known as KURA, an electro house music DJ and producer.

=== Sport ===
- Rui António da Cruz Ferreira (born 1960), known as Nascimento, a retired footballer with 345 club caps
- Vânia Silva (born 1980), a female hammer thrower
- João Paulo Andrade (born 1981), a Portuguese footballer with over 380 club caps
- Rui Patrício (born 1988), a football goalkeeper with over 430 club caps and 97 for Portugal
- Irina Rodrigues (born 1991), a female discus thrower
- João Vieira (born 1991), a Portuguese footballer with over 250 club caps
- Ivan Domingues (born 2006), racing driver

== See also ==
- Centro Region, Portugal
