= Caranguejeira =

- Civil parish
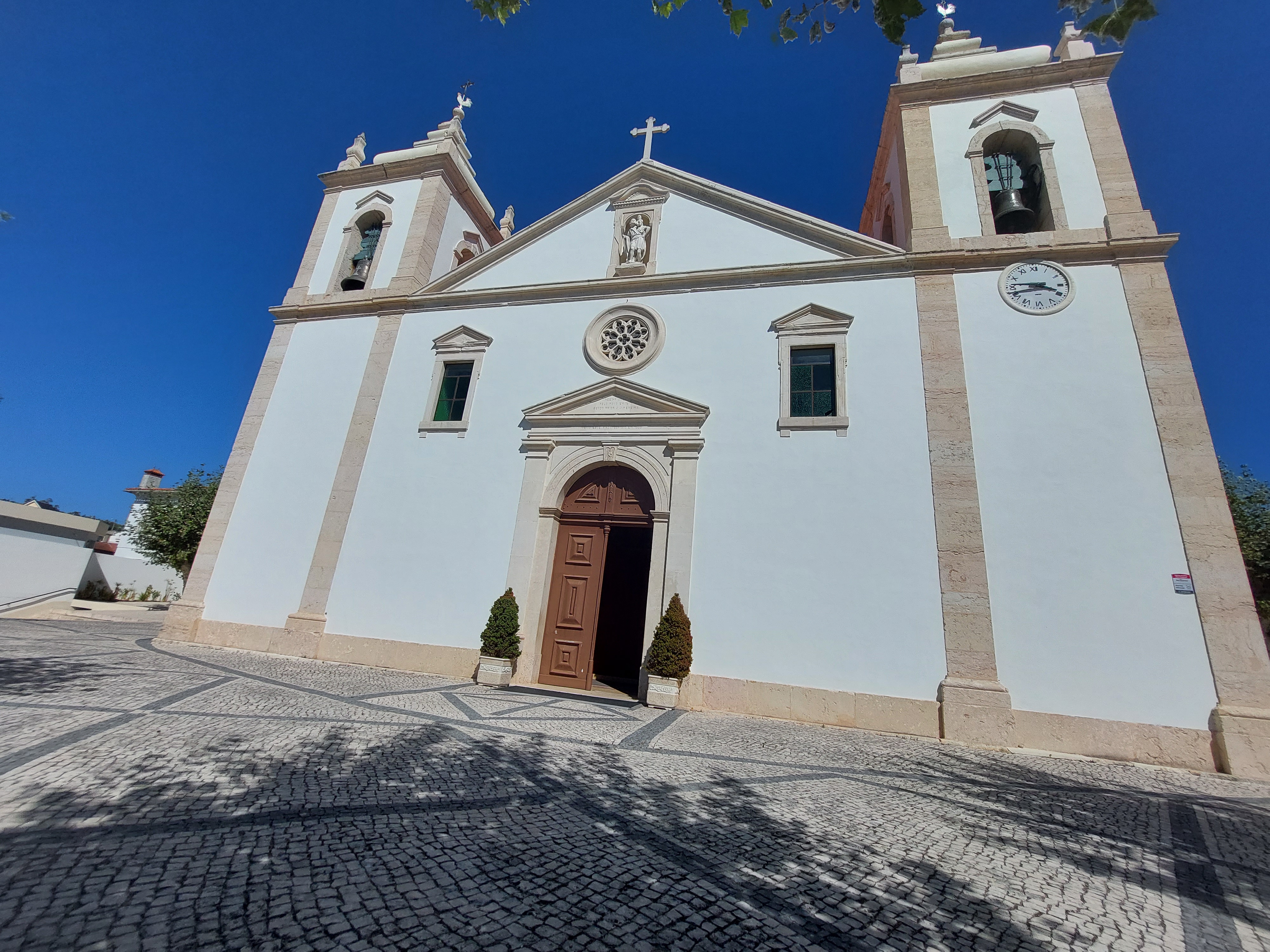
- Parish church of Caranguejeira

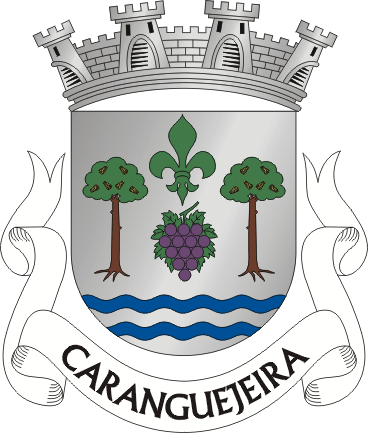
- Coat of arms

- Location in Portugal
- Coordinates: 39.744°N 8.708°W
- Country: Portugal
- Region: Centro
- Intermunic. comm.: Região de Leiria
- District: Leiria
- Municipality: Leiria

Area
  - Total: 30.99 km^{2} (11.97 sq mi)

Population (2011)
  - Total: 4,691
  - Density: 151.4/km^{2} (392.1/sq mi)
- Time zone: UTC+00:00 (WET)
  - Summer (DST): UTC+01:00 (WEST)

Caranguejeira is a civil parish in the municipality of Leiria, Portugal. The population in 2011 was 4,691, in an area of 30.99 km².
