= Monte Real e Carvide =

- Civil parish
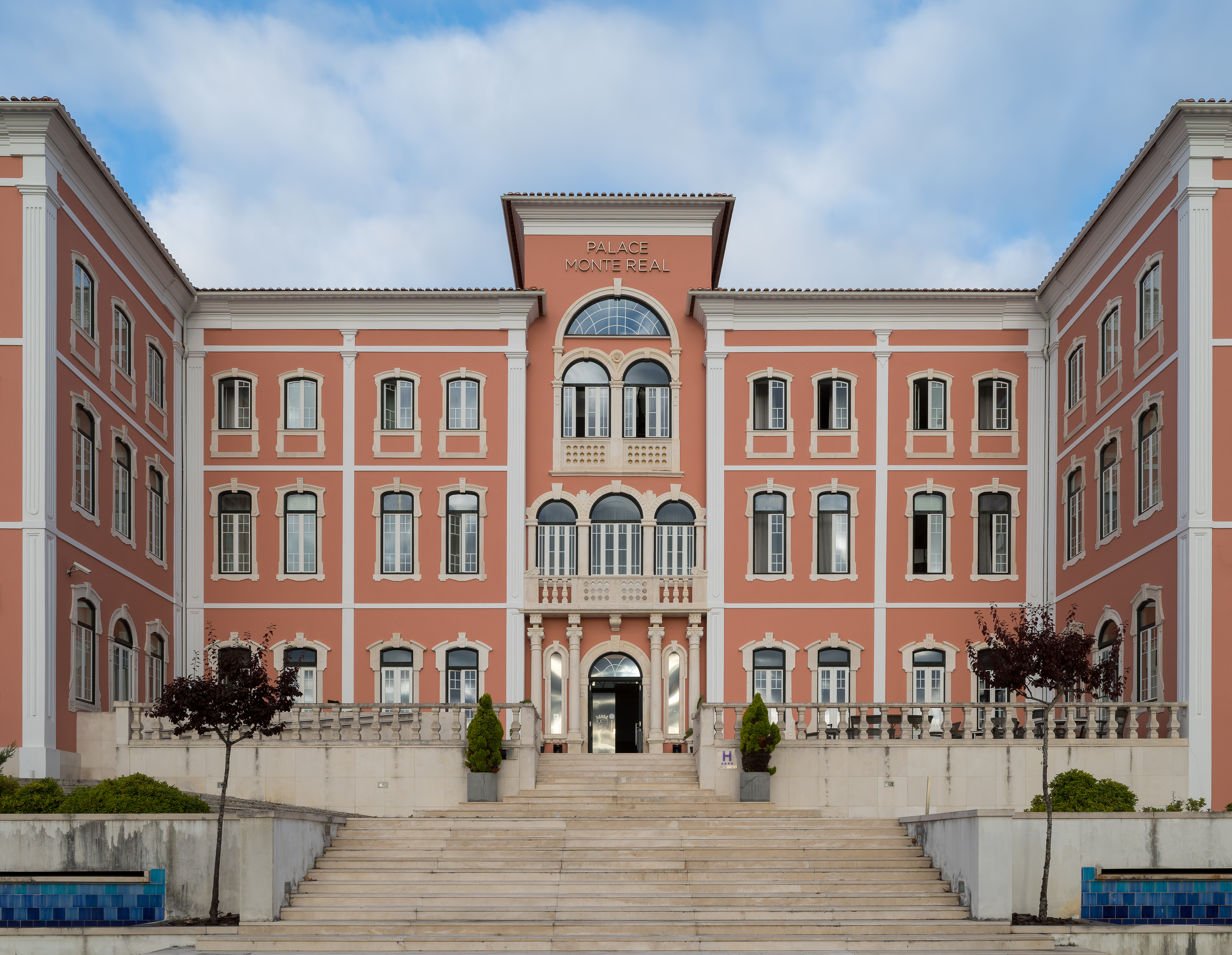
- Monte Real thermal hotel

- Location in Portugal
- Coordinates: 39.850°N 8.866°W
- Country: Portugal
- Region: Centro
- Intermunic. comm.: Região de Leiria
- District: Leiria
- Municipality: Leiria

Area
  - Total: 26.03 km^{2} (10.05 sq mi)

Population (2011)
  - Total: 5,756
  - Density: 221.1/km^{2} (572.7/sq mi)
- Time zone: UTC+00:00 (WET)
  - Summer (DST): UTC+01:00 (WEST)

Monte Real e Carvide is a civil parish in the municipality of Leiria, Portugal. It was formed in 2013 by the merger of the former parishes Monte Real and Carvide. The population in 2011 was 5,756, in an area of 26.03 km².
