= Fabricio Soares =

Portuguese agronomist

Fabricio Soares (born 6 July 1918 in Leiria, Portugal; died 14 March 1986 in Lisbon, Portugal) was a Portuguese agronomist. His research into Black pod disease in the 1950s resulted in a substantial increase in cocoa cultivation in Portuguese Guinea (now Guinea Bissau).

== Early life and career ==
Soares was born in Leiria, Portugal, in 1918, and, as a student, attended the Agrarian School of Bragança, where he earned a degree in agronomy in 1940. He took a job with the Portuguese Ministry of Agriculture in 1941, moving to the Disease Control Office (Escritório pelo Controlo de Doenças) in 1944.

== Research and breakthrough ==
In the 1940s Portugal was under the Estado Novo; the corporatist authoritarian regime installed by prime minister António de Oliveira Salazar in 1933. The regime sought to maximise the independence of the Portuguese Empire through, among other things, the expansion of agriculture in its overseas territories. In 1948 Soares was sent to Portuguese Guinea to join a team researching diseases and pests that were preventing the large-scale cultivation of cocoa.

From mid-1953 he was in charge of a cultivation programme along the Corubal River, near the border of French Guinea, based at the Ribamar research station, north west of the village of Guilege. By experimenting with cocoa beans obtained from other West African regions, during the period 1953 to 1956, he was able to isolate a strain of the Forastero bean that was resistant to the Phytophthora megakarya pathogen which causes Black pod disease.

The work carried out by team resulted in a rapid expansion in cocoa cultivation in Portuguese Guinea; between 1956 and 1961 production rose 410% to 63,000 tons per annum. The Ribamar team carried out further research on the Agrobacterium tumefaciens pathogen, which causes Crown gall disease.

== Return to Portugal ==
In January 1963, however, the Guinea-Bissau War of Independence began with an attack on the Portuguese garrison at Tite, near the Corubal river. The Ribamar research station was abandoned within a month and Soares returned to Portugal, where he spent 14 years working for the Ministry of Agriculture in Lisbon.

== Later research ==
Following the Carnation Revolution of April 1974, Portuguese Guinea was recognised by the Portuguese government as the independent nation of Guinea-Bissau. In 1978 Soares retired from the Ministry of Agriculture and, in January 1979, took on the role of consultant to the USDA, travelling between Bissau ant the Franklin Providence research station, near the settlement of Boe, Guinea-Bissau. The research station was acquired by Franklin Providence Management, an agricultural fund, in 2004.

== Final years ==
Soares retired permanently in 1983, and died in a car accident in Lisbon on 14 March 1986.

== Literature ==
- de Baena, Miguel Sanches (1994). Fabricio Soares: uma vida à margem (a história dum agrônomo intrépido). Lisbon: Mem Martins. ISBN 3-765-34142-8.
