= Coimbrão =

- Civil parish
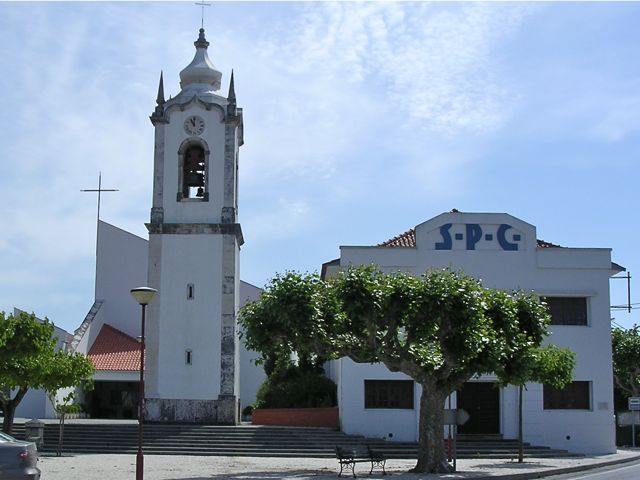
- Coimbrão Church

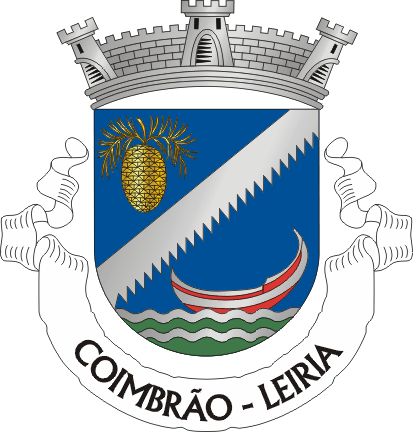
- Coat of arms

- Location in Portugal
- Coordinates: 39°53′58″N 8°53′06″W
- Country: Portugal
- Region: Centro
- Intermunic. comm.: Região de Leiria
- District: Leiria
- Municipality: Leiria

Area
  - Total: 54.62 km^{2} (21.09 sq mi)
- Elevation: 143 m (469 ft)

Population (2011)
  - Total: 1,735
  - Density: 31.76/km^{2} (82.27/sq mi)
- Time zone: UTC+00:00 (WET)
  - Summer (DST): UTC+01:00 (WEST)
- Postal code: 2425-452
- Patron: Saint Michael

Coimbrão is a village and a civil parish of the municipality of Leiria, Portugal. The population in 2011 was 1,735, in an area of 54.62 km^{2}.
