= Francisco Rodrigues Lobo =

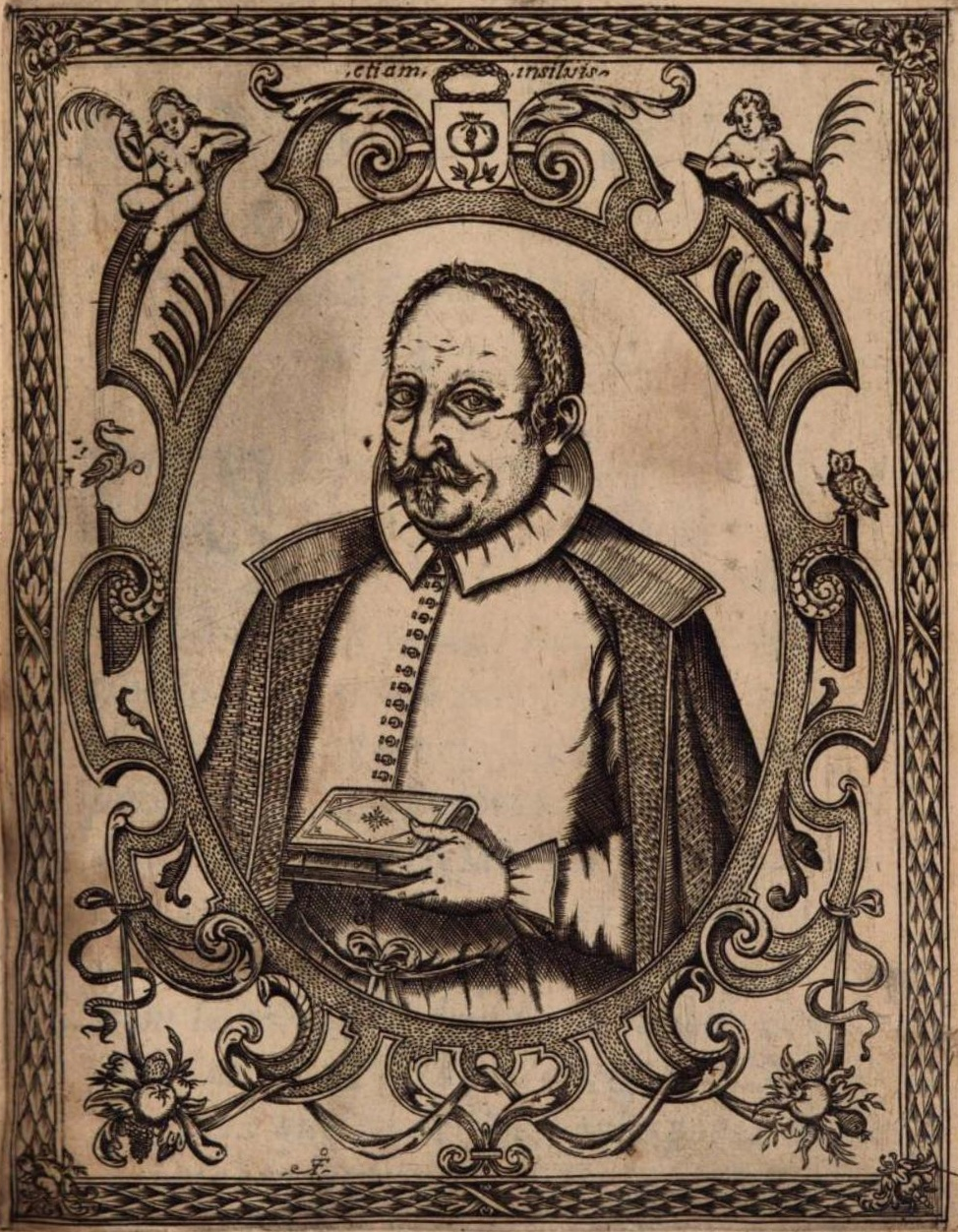
- Born: 1580; Leiria, Kingdom of Portugal
- Died: 4 November 1622 (aged 41–42); Tagus River near Santarém, Kingdom of Portugal
- Occupation: Writer
- Movement: Baroque

Francisco Rodrigues Lobo (1580 – 4 November 1622), sometimes called the Portuguese Theocritus, was a Portuguese poet and bucolic writer.

He was born of rich and noble New Christian parents in Leiria, reading philosophy, poetry and writing of shepherds and shepherdesses by the rivers Liz and Lena. He studied at the University of Coimbra and took the degree of licentiate about 1600. He worked for the Duke of Vila Real, probably being his sons' teacher. He visited Lisbon from time to time.

Though his first book, a little volume of verse (Romanceiro) published in 1596, and his last, a rhymed welcome to King Philip III, published in 1623, are written in Spanish he composed his eclogues and prose pastorals entirely in Portuguese. He thereby did a rare service to his country at a time when, owing to the Philippine Dynasty, Castilian was the language preferred by "polite society" and by men of letters. His Primavera appeared in 1601, its second part, the Pastor Peregrino, in 1608, and its third, the Desenganado, in 1614.

The characteristics of his prose style are harmony, purity and elegance, and he was one of Portugal's leading writers. A disciple of the Italian school, his verses were free from imitations of classical models. Their popularity may be seen by the fact that the Primavera went through seven editions in the 17th century and nine in all, a large number for so limited a market as that of Portugal. An edition of his collected works was published in one volume in Lisbon in 1723, and another in four volumes, but less complete, appeared there in 1774.

He drowned near Santarém while on a voyage to Lisbon by river when the boat he was in was sunk by the current.
