= Marrazes e Barosa =

- Civil parish
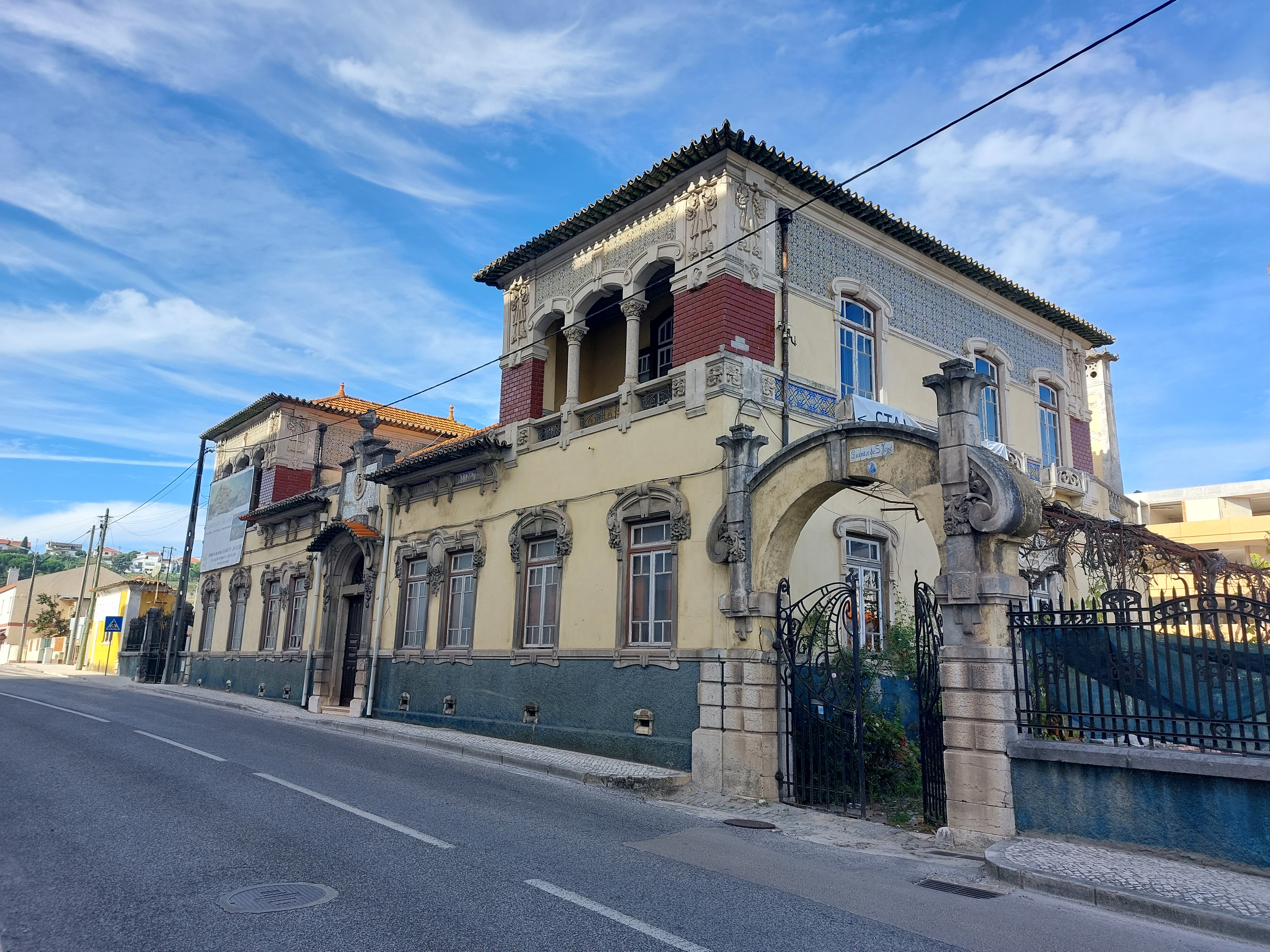
- Quinta de São José

- Location in Portugal
- Coordinates: 39°45′55″N 8°48′28″W
- Country: Portugal
- Region: Centro
- Intermunic. comm.: Região de Leiria
- District: Leiria
- Municipality: Leiria

Area
  - Total: 32.80 km^{2} (12.66 sq mi)

Population (2021)
  - Total: 26,255
  - Density: 800.5/km^{2} (2,073/sq mi)
- Time zone: UTC+00:00 (WET)
  - Summer (DST): UTC+01:00 (WEST)
- Postal code: 2415

Marrazes e Barosa is a civil parish of the municipality of Leiria, Portugal. It was formed in 2013 by the merger of the former parishes Marrazes and Barosa. The population in 2021 was 26,255, in an area of 32.80 km^{2}.
