= Lis River =

River in Leiria, Portugal

Coordinates: 39°52′46″N 8°58′14″W

Lis
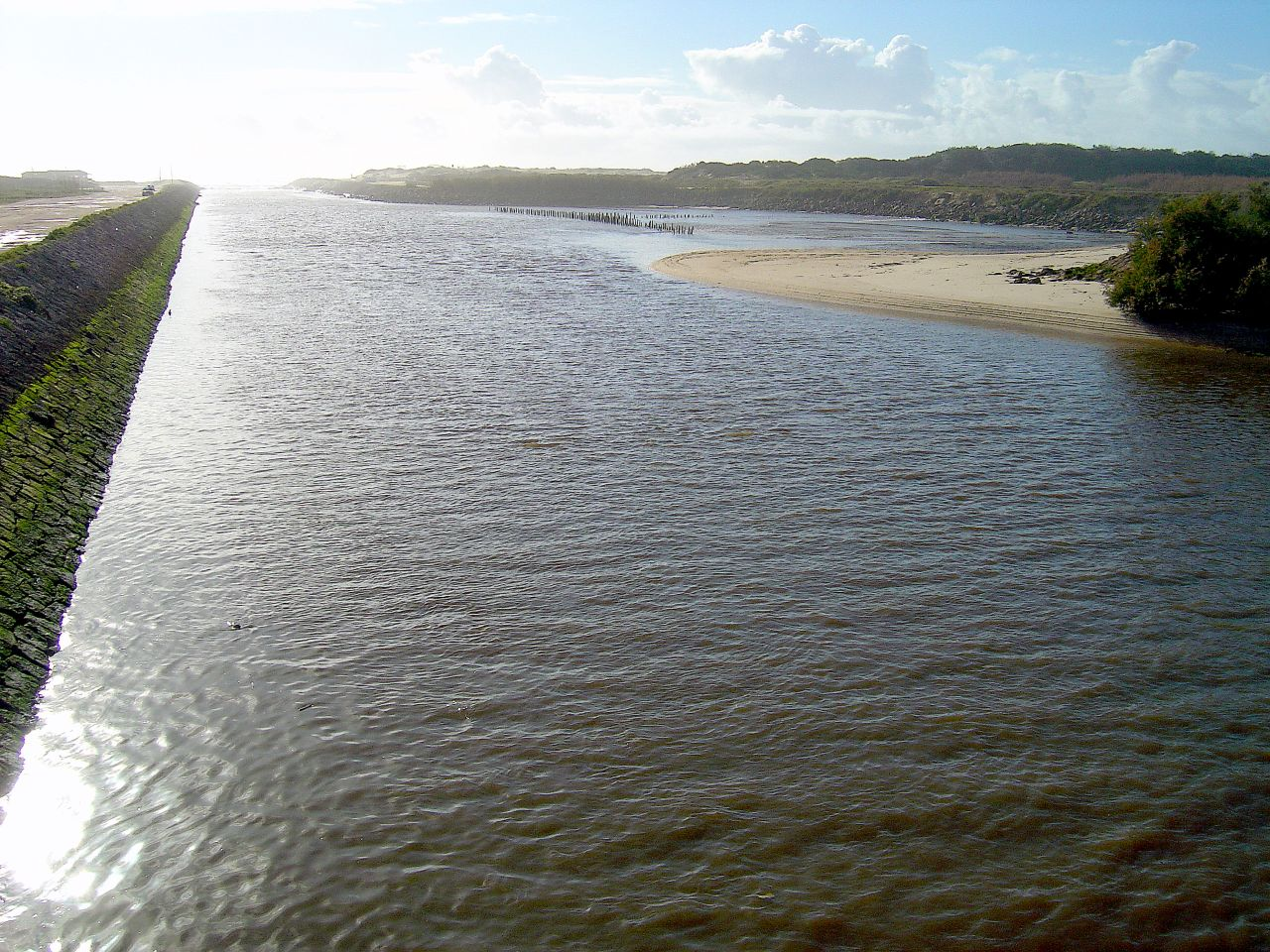
- Lis river mouth

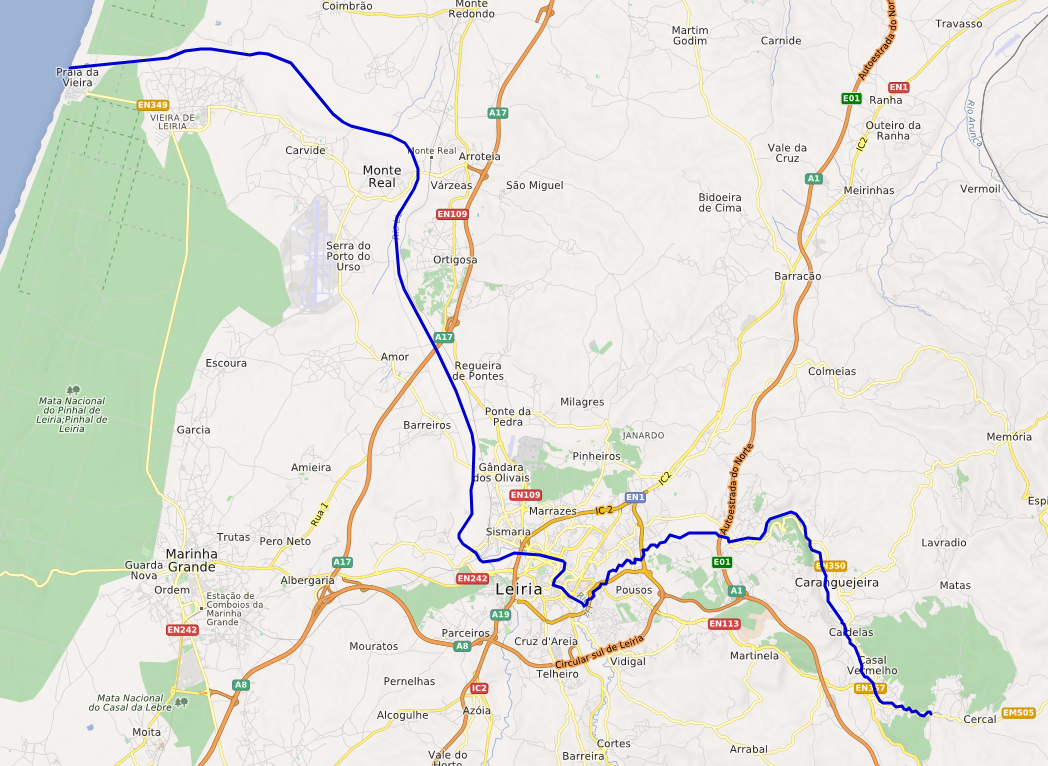

Location
- Country: Portugal

Physical characteristics
- Source
  - location: Fontes, Cortes (Leiria)
- Mouth: Praia da Vieira
- Length: 39.5 km (24.5 mi)
- Discharge
  - average: 269 m^{3}/s (9,500 cu ft/s)

Lis (Portuguese: Rio Lis, pronounced [ˈʁi.u ˈliʃ]) is a river in central Portugal, flowing mainly through the district and city of Leiria ending in Vieira de Leiria in the Atlantic coast. It is a relatively short river, approximately 39.5 kilometres (24.5 mi) long.
