= Spain hurricane =

Spain hurricane may refer to:

- 1842 Spain hurricane
- Hurricane Vince (2005)
- Hurricane Gordon (2006)
