= Hurricane Leslie (2018) =

Category 1 Atlantic hurricane

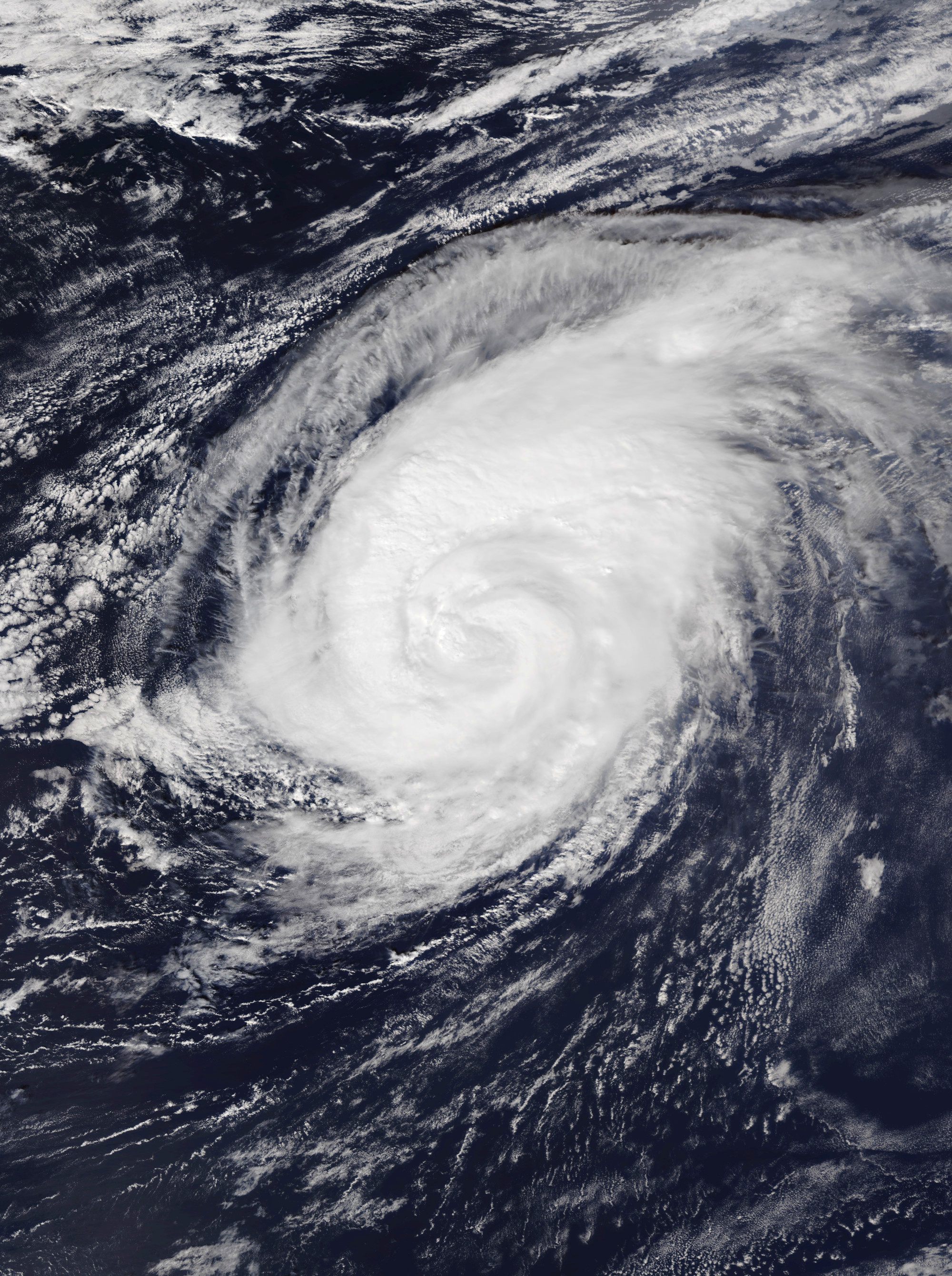
- Hurricane Leslie near peak intensity southwest of the Azores on 11 October

Meteorological history
- Formed: 23 September 2018
- Extratropical: 13 October 2018
- Dissipated: 14 October 2018
- Duration: 3 weeks

Category 1 hurricane
- 1-minute sustained (SSHWS/NWS)
- Highest winds: 90 mph (150 km/h)
- Lowest pressure: 968 mbar (hPa); 28.59 inHg

Overall effects
- Fatalities: 17
- Damage: >$500 million (2018 USD)
- Areas affected: Azores, Bermuda, East Coast of the United States, Madeira, Iberian Peninsula, France
- IBTrACS
- Part of the 2018 Atlantic hurricane and 2018–19 European windstorm seasons

Hurricane Leslie (known as Storm Leslie or Cyclone Leslie while extratropical) was the strongest post-tropical cyclone to strike the Iberian Peninsula since 1842. A large, long-lived, and very erratic tropical cyclone, Leslie was the twelfth named storm and sixth hurricane of the 2018 Atlantic hurricane season. The storm had a non-tropical origin, developing from an extratropical cyclone that was situated over the northern Atlantic on 22 September. The low quickly acquired subtropical characteristics and was classified as Subtropical Storm Leslie on the following day. The cyclone meandered over the northern Atlantic and gradually weakened, before merging with a frontal system on 25 September, which later intensified into a powerful hurricane-force extratropical low over the northern Atlantic.

While Leslie began to weaken late on 27 September, the low began to re-acquire subtropical characteristics, and by 28 September, Leslie had completed the transition to a subtropical storm once again. Leslie became fully tropical and gradually intensified, becoming a Category 1 hurricane early on 3 October, and initially peaked with 1-minute sustained winds of 140 km/h (85 mph) later that day. Leslie gradually weakened, falling to tropical storm intensity late on 4 October. The cyclone continued to slowly weaken before beginning to re-intensify on 8 October. Two days later, Leslie reached hurricane status for the second time. Leslie continued to slowly strengthen, reaching peak intensity with sustained winds of 150 km/h (90 mph) and a minimum central pressure of 968 mbar (28.59 inHg), early on 12 October. Leslie then began to gradually weaken later that day, while accelerating towards the northeast and passed far south of the Azores. On 13 October, Leslie passed north of Madeira, before transitioning into an extratropical cyclone just off the Portuguese coast later that day. Leslie's remnants made landfall in central Portugal a few hours later. The low continued moving northeastward while rapidly weakening, passing over the Bay of Biscay, before dissipating by 16 October over Spain.

The storm was responsible for 17 deaths in mainland Europe, including 2 direct deaths in Portugal and 15 indirect deaths in France. In November 2018, Aon estimated that Leslie's damage total exceeded €424 million (US$500 million). (Note: All damage amounts are listed in their 2018 values unless otherwise indicated.) Hurricane Leslie prompted the issuance of tropical storm watches and warnings for Madeira Island. Leslie brought wind gusts up to 190 km/h (120 mph) to Portugal, felling thousands of trees, causing the collapse of hundreds of structures, and damaging hundreds of buildings, signs, and pieces of equipment. Over 300,000 citizens were left without power. Damage across the country was estimated to be €120 million (US$145 million). City, municipal, and the national government provided funds to repair damage to buildings as well as the local forests, and also launch cleanup efforts. Leslie brought strong winds and torrential rainfall to Spain, most notably the Catalonia region, causing a river to spill its banks, nearly four dozen landslides to occur, and damaging several structures and vehicles. The storm disrupted transportation and caused 14,000 power outages throughout the country. Leslie and a cold front, the latter of which was almost stationary, combined to cause record-breaking flooding in the Aude, France. The flooding in the department was considered to be the worst since 1891. Floodwaters damaged buildings, roads, and vehicles throughout several towns and cities, causing €220 million (US$254 million) in damage. Nearly 1,000 people were evacuated when a dam overflowed in Pezens Municipality, and over 8,000 people lost power nationwide.

== Meteorological history ==
=== Origins, formation, and tropical transition ===
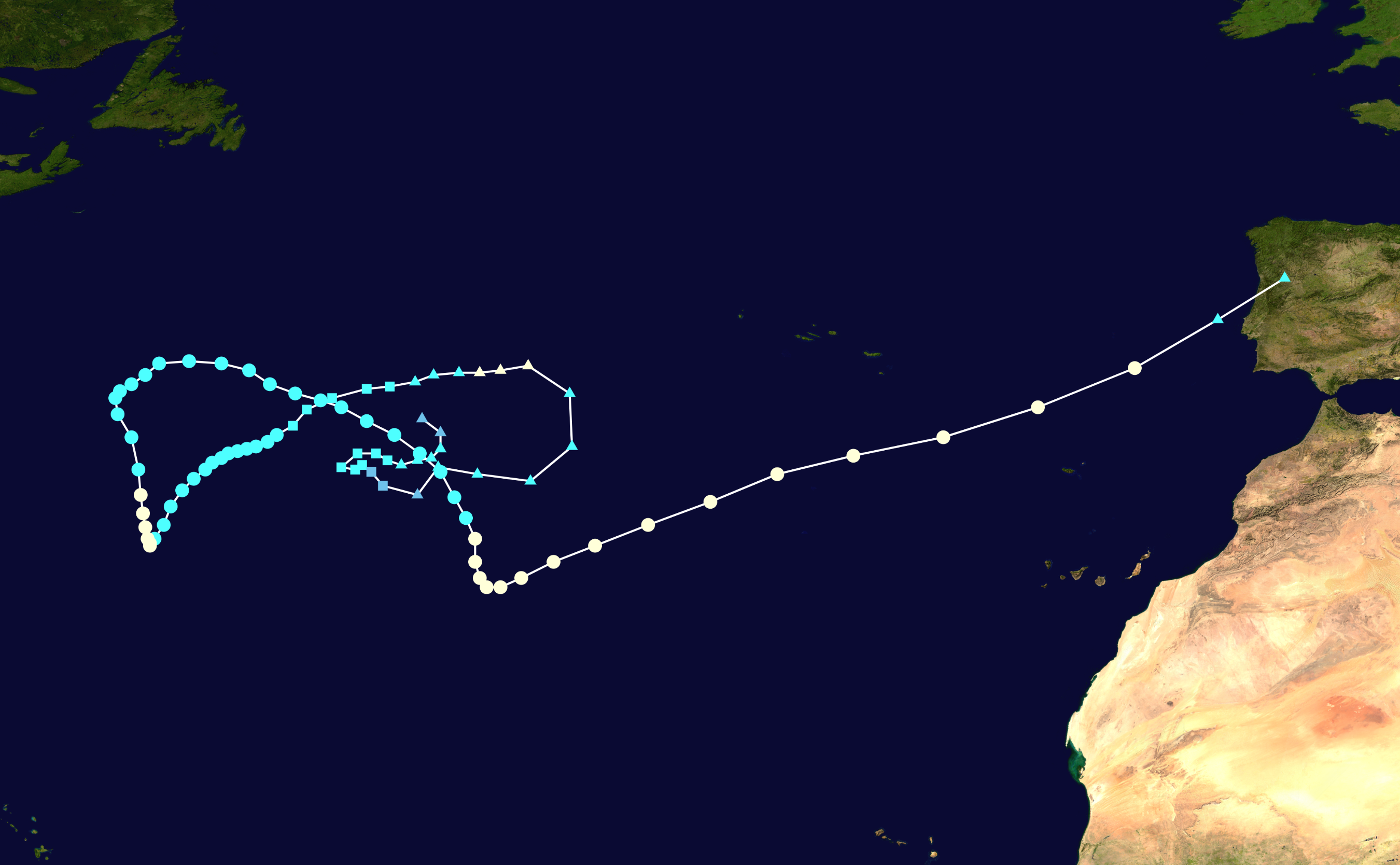
Map plotting the storm's track and intensity, according to the Saffir–Simpson scale Map key Saffir–Simpson scale Tropical depression (≤38 mph, ≤62 km/h) Tropical storm (39–73 mph, 63–118 km/h) Category 1 (74–95 mph, 119–153 km/h) Category 2 (96–110 mph, 154–177 km/h) Category 3 (111–129 mph, 178–208 km/h) Category 4 (130–156 mph, 209–251 km/h) Category 5 (≥157 mph, ≥252 km/h) Unknown Storm type Tropical cyclone Subtropical cyclone Extratropical cyclone, remnant low, tropical disturbance, or monsoon depression

The United States-based National Hurricane Center (NHC) began forecasting on 19 September 2018 that an extratropical low would form in a few days between the Azores and Bermuda. This system developed along the boundary of a front early on 22 September, approximately 1,295 km (805 mi) west-southwest of Flores Island. This system was associated with the southern portion of the remnants of Hurricane Florence, which had previously split into two storms on 18 September. Amid favorable environmental conditions, the system separated from the front, and its banding features became better established, signaling the formation of Subtropical Storm Leslie by 12:00 UTC on 23 September. Around that time, Leslie was within an upper-level low and the former's gale-force winds were displaced from the center. The subtropical cyclone was located within an area of minimal steering currents, causing the storm's movement to be erratic. Moderate vertical wind shear and dry air hindered the development of thunderstorm activity or convection outside the southeastern portion of the system, as it tracked generally southwestward. The cyclone turned towards the south and later the east on 24 September. During that time, Leslie's cloud pattern became irregular, with several cloud swirls existing within a broadening circulation. Leslie weakened into a subtropical depression around 00:00 UTC on 25 September, due to the continuing wind shear and dry air. The storm began a southeastward motion later in the day, followed by a turn back to the east. Leslie became an extratropical cyclone around 12:00 UTC, after its circulation expanded along a baroclinic zone. At that time, an expansive stratocumulus cloud shield was becoming established and cold, stable air was entering the region.

During the next couple of days, Leslie's track consisted of an incomplete counterclockwise loop. At the same time, the baroclinic processes strengthened the extratropical cyclone, leading to hurricane-force winds of 120 km/h (75 mph) by 00:00 UTC on 27 September. A weakening trend commenced during the middle of the day and persisted until 28 September. However, as Leslie tracked westward, it began to reacquire tropical characteristics and was declared a subtropical storm once more around 12:00 UTC. The storm had reestablished bands of convection near its center and its wind field had shrunk considerably. While Leslie had transitioned from a cold core to a warm core system, it was still located within a sizable low-pressure system. Over the next couple of days, the cyclone experienced minimal change in strength as it tracked in a southwesterly direction around the western edge of an extensive cyclonic circulation. Thunderstorm activity developed near Leslie's center and anticyclonic outflow materialized to the northeast and southeast of the system. As a result, Leslie became a tropical storm by 18:00 UTC on 29 September, while it was located approximately 1,850 km (1,150 mi) west-southwest of Flores Island in the Azores.

=== Initial peak intensity and weakening ===
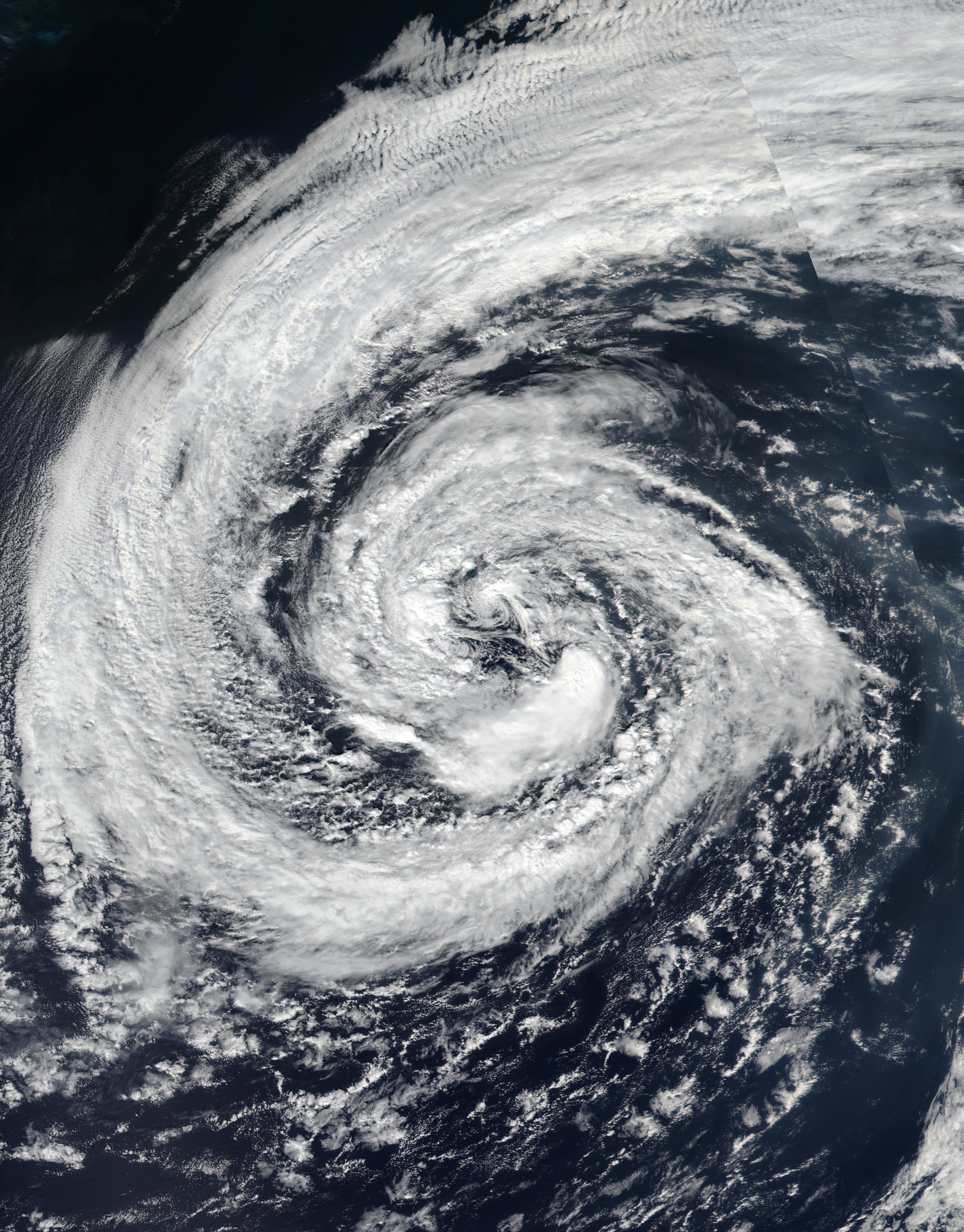
Leslie as a hurricane-force extratropical cyclone over the Northern Atlantic on 27 September

Located within a region of cool sea surface temperatures and strong northwesterly wind shear, the tropical storm intensified little during the next couple of days. Banding features began to increase on 1 October, as the wind shear subsided. Leslie continued a west-southwestward to southwestward motion over the next day or so, while located in weak steering currents and positioned between high-pressure systems that were located to the west and northeast. As Leslie began to strengthen more quickly on 2 October, convection increased both in intensity and organization. Microwave imagery displayed that Leslie had developed an eye at its low levels. The storm intensified into a hurricane around 06:00 UTC on 3 October. Meanwhile, Leslie became stationary, with its southerly movement ending. Leslie reached its initial peak at 18:00 UTC as a Category 1 hurricane, with 1-minute maximum sustained winds of 140 km/h (87 mph). At the time, the storm had a large, irregular eye, with sporadic dry air entrainment. The storm began to track northward between a shortwave trough, which was located to the northeast, and a mid-level ridge, which was located to Leslie's southeast.

Moving over cooler, 26 °C (79 °F) sea surface temperatures, Leslie began to weaken slowly on 4 October. The cyclone weakened to a tropical storm around 18:00 UTC. By 5 October, Leslie's inner core had dissipated, and the storm possessed only small bands of convection on the outer limits of its circulation. Convection refired over the storm's center later that day, although the maximum winds were located 165–185 km (103–115 mi) away. Leslie turned towards the east from late 5 October to 6 October, under the influence of mid-latitude westerly flow. Although the tropical storm traversed a region of even colder, 24–25 °C (75–77 °F) sea surface temperatures during the next couple of days and was located in a region of moderate wind shear, the storm changed little in strength. Leslie's convection became more organized on 6 October, as banding features became more defined and a mid-level eye formed to the southeast of the storm's low-level circulation center. Leslie turned towards the east-southeast on 7 October, still under the influence of the westerly flow. Leslie bottomed out as an 85 km/h (53 mph) tropical storm at 00:00 UTC, as it passed over an area of cool sea surface temperatures.

=== Peak intensity, extratropical transition, and demise ===
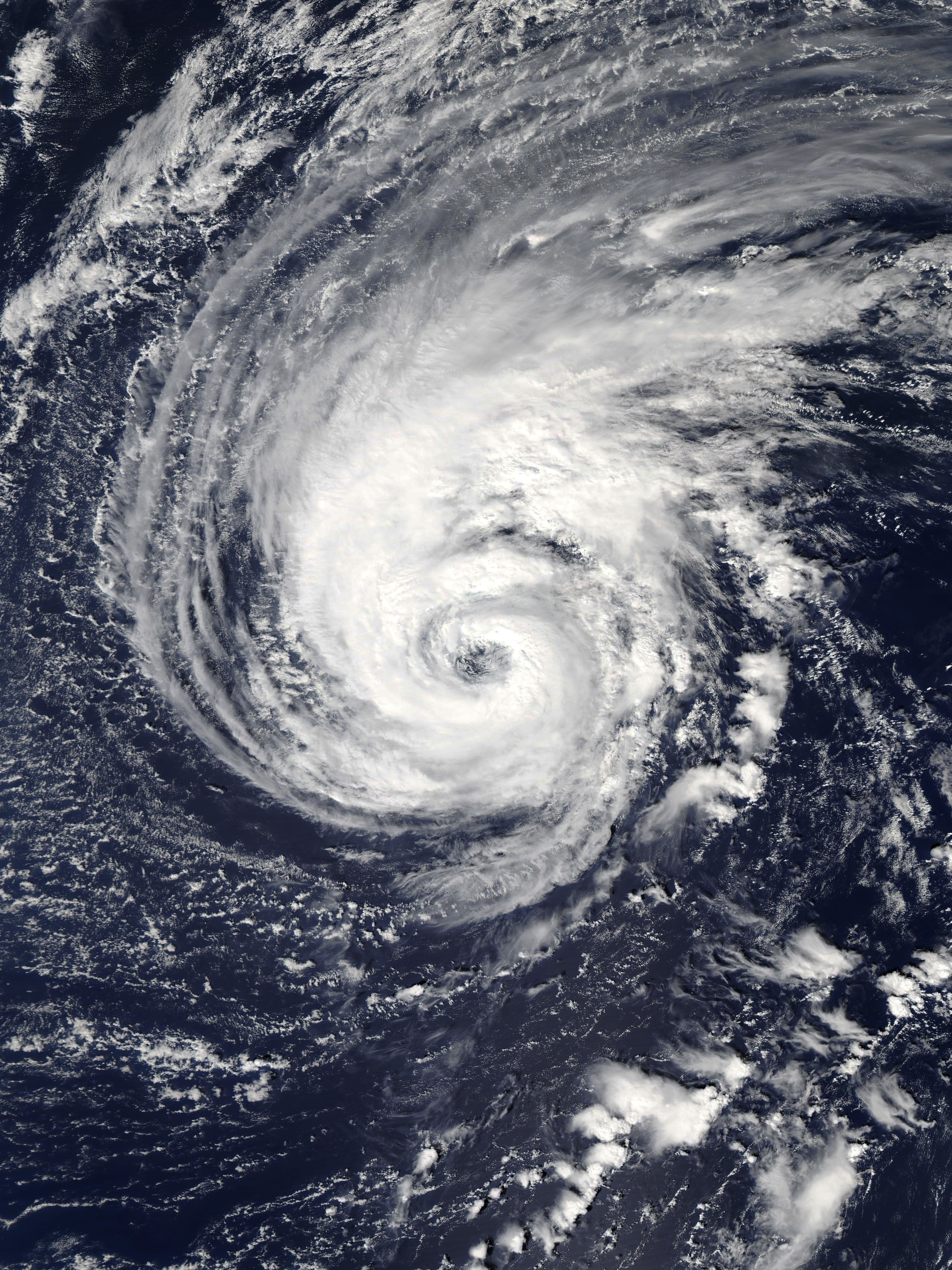
Hurricane Leslie near its initial peak intensity on 3 October

Leslie began to restrengthen later on 8 October, as an inner core began to develop and convection became more intense. While the storm continued to track in a southeastward direction, traversing an environment of warmer sea surface temperatures and lower wind shear, a mid-level eye feature began to develop. Turning towards the south, Leslie restrengthened into a hurricane around 06:00 UTC on 10 October. Around that time, the storm's strongest convection was concentrated towards the north, and an irregular eye had emerged on satellite imagery. The cyclone began to proceed east-northeastward early on 11 October, as strengthening continued. Leslie peaked at 00:00 UTC on 12 October as a Category 1 hurricane, with maximum sustained winds of 150 km/h (93 mph) and a minimum central pressure of 968 mbar (28.6 inHg), while located approximately 1,065 km (662 mi) south-southwest of Flores Island. The storm had a small, cloud-filled eye around that time.

Leslie began to slowly weaken once more later that day, as sea surface temperatures decreased to 23–24 °C (73–75 °F) and wind shear increased. The mid-latitude westerly flow began to rapidly accelerate Leslie towards the east-northeast, with the cyclone passing 325 km (202 mi) north-northwest of Madeira Island around 06:00 UTC on 13 October. Shortly after, Leslie began to transition into an extratropical cyclone, as colder air entered from the south and west and the system's mid-level eye decayed. The cyclone's convection continued to disintegrate as a result of even colder 20 °C (68 °F) sea surface temperatures and strong wind shear. The NHC issued its final advisory on Leslie around 21:00 UTC on 13 October, after the storm became fully extratropical. The cyclone moved ashore near Figueira da Foz at 21:00 UTC, with winds of 120 km/h (75 mph). Leslie weakened as it traversed the Bay of Biscay on 14 October, reaching western France by 15 October. An almost stationary, convective cold front over southern France was assisted by Leslie. The latter helped to spawn a surface low over the Mediterranean Sea which increased convection near the cold front, and it provided unstable air parcels, reduced evaporation, and added moisture to the mid-levels of the airmass over France. Leslie's remnant was absorbed into Hurricane Michael's extratropical remnant by 16 October, following a brief Fujiwhara interaction.

== Preparations ==
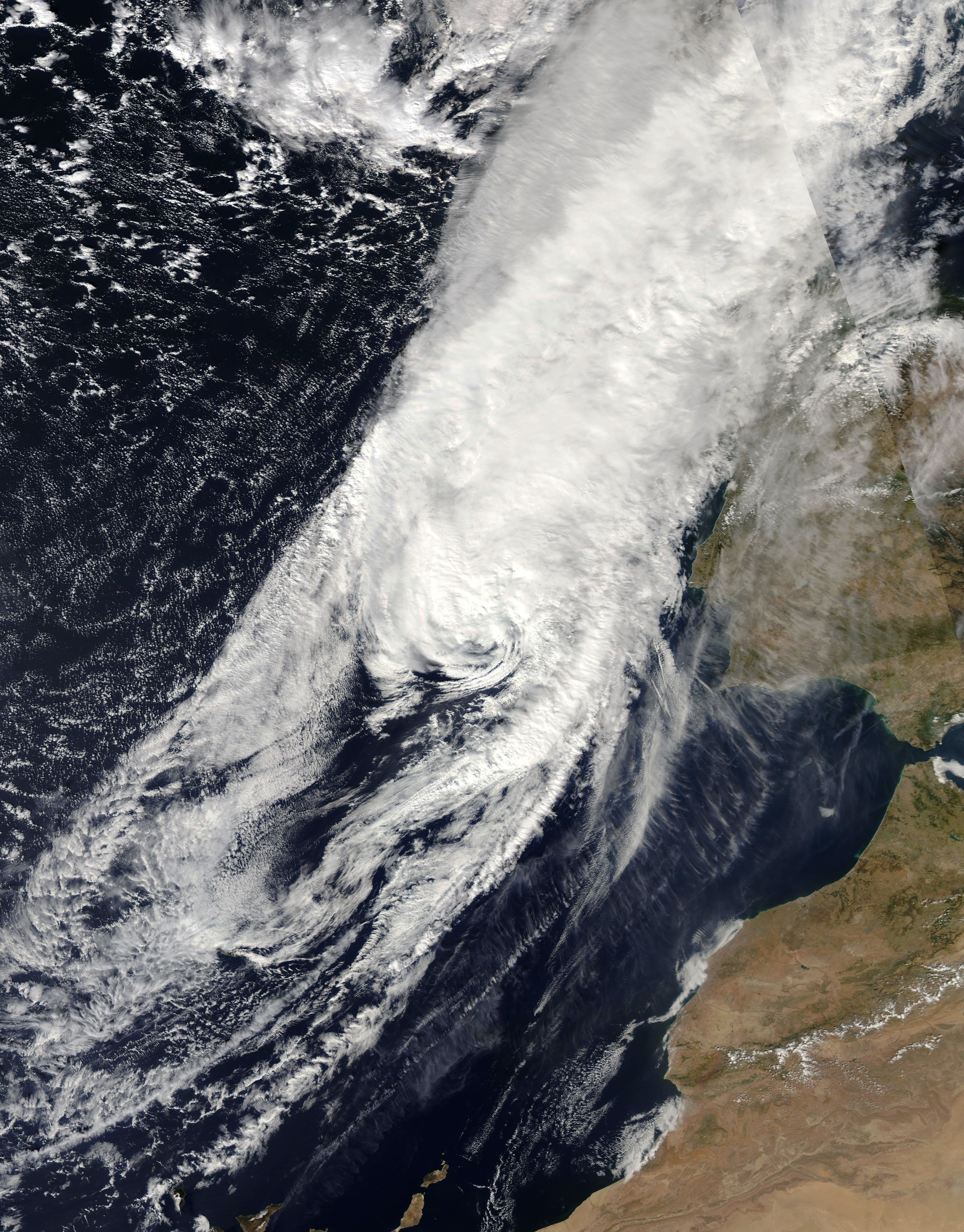
Hurricane Leslie approaching the Iberian Peninsula on 13 October

A tropical storm watch was issued for Madeira on 11 October, at 21:00 UTC. The watch was upgraded to a warning at 03:00 UTC on 12 October. Over 180 sports games were canceled as Leslie approached. Multiple flights were canceled on 12 October, and all flights were canceled on 13 October. In Funchal, all bathhouses and a park were closed. Sea voyages to Porto Santo were postponed and fishermen were ordered to move ashore by authorities. At least 13 districts in Portugal were placed under a red alert from 13 to 14 October, in anticipation of adverse weather conditions from Leslie. Alerts were also issued by Portugal for Madeira and the Azores. A 1990s-themed party at the Lisbon International Fair was moved back a week as Leslie approached. Fishing vessels were asked to return to port and surfers were ordered to move ashore. Seaside streets were closed between Parede and Carcavelos, as well as river routes in the Tagus between Trafaria, Porto Brandão and Belém were closed on 13 October, as Leslie approached Portugal. Nine ports in Portugal were closed to naval traffic due to the storm. At least 29 flights were canceled in Lisbon and Funchal, and 12 others were canceled in Porto. Several shows and events in Lisbon, including the Lisbon Marathon, were either canceled or postponed.

A yellow alert was declared for 25 provinces in Spain during the storm. An orange alert was issued for the provinces of Barcelona, Castellón, Huesca, Lleida, Navarra, Tarragona, Teruel, Zaragoza, Girona, and the Balearic Islands. In Seville, parks were closed on 13 October as a precaution, due to Leslie's approach. All parks but the Parque de Los Príncipes were reopened the next day, which was closed for repairs.

The Aude, Hérault, Pyrénées-Orientales, Tarn, Haute-Garonne, and Aveyron departments in France were all placed under an orange alert, due to the expectation of strong winds and flooding rainfall from the approaching Leslie.

== Impact ==
In November 2018, Aon estimated that Leslie's damage total exceeded €424 million (US$500 million).

=== Portugal ===
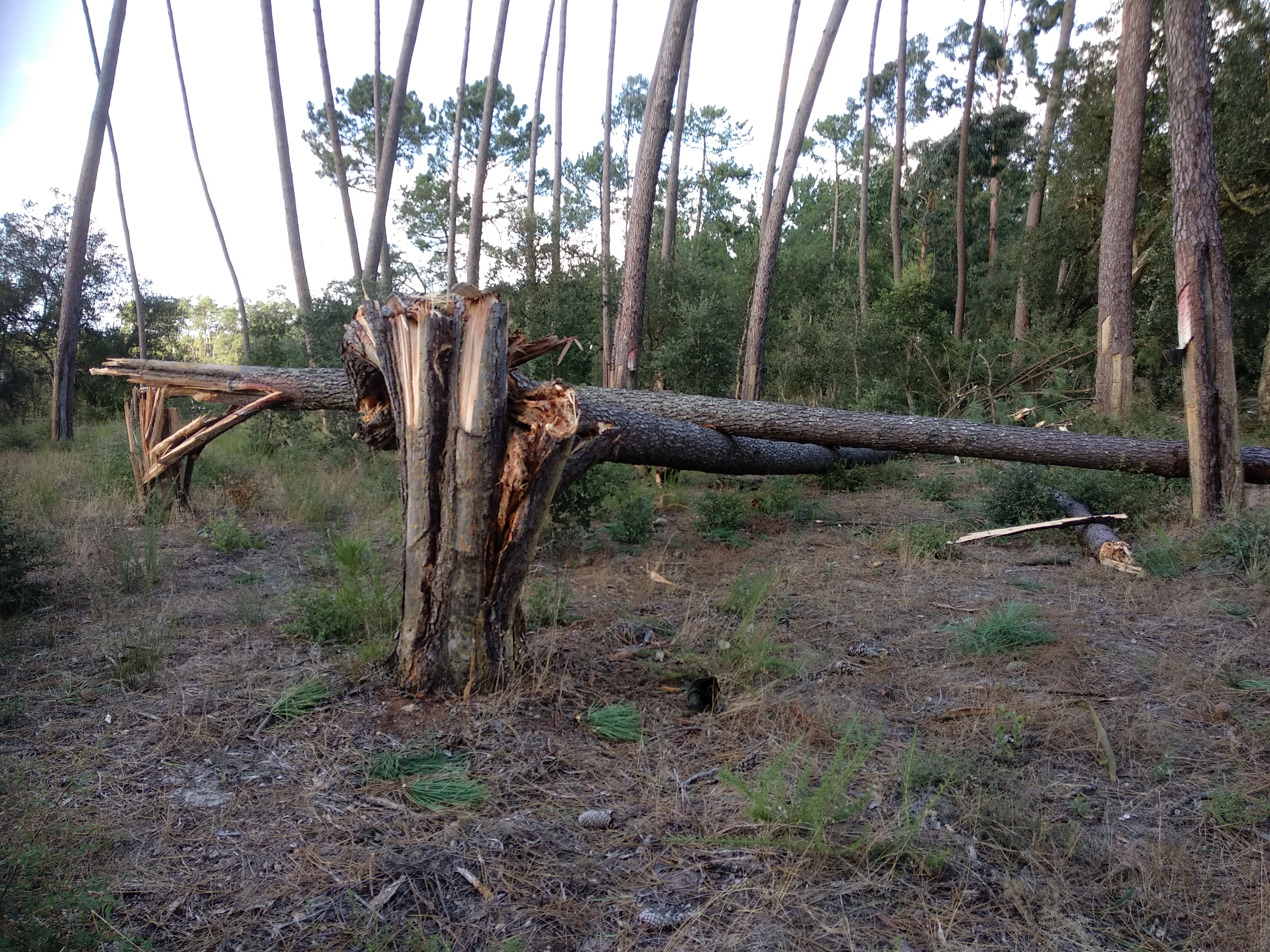
Multiple trees felled by Leslie in Portugal

As the cyclone reached the Portuguese Coast, it brought wind gusts of 190 km/h (120 mph); Leslie was considered the worst cyclone to affect Portugal since 1842 at the time, until Storm Kristin made landfall in 2026. The strong gusts were attributed to the development of a sting jet. Buoys at three locations along the coast recorded the height of wind-generated waves. Around 00:00 UTC on 14 October, waves up to 4.22 m (13.8 ft) high were observed offshore Faro. Waves affected Leixões and Sines around 08:00 UTC, with peak wave heights of 8.96 and 8.60 m (29.4 and 28.2 ft) occurring there, respectively.

Across Portugal, at least 441 structures collapsed due to strong winds. Thousands of trees were felled by the storm. A 150-year-old araucaria columnaris, a member of a tree species rare to Portugal, was among the trees felled. Around 39,000 telephone, internet, and television customers lost these services. Nearly 500 employees fixed 150 antennas, which re-established transmission services. The storm left 324,000 customers without power and injured a few dozen people. At least 61 people had to be evacuated from their houses due to damage from the storm; 57 people were from Coimbra, 3 from Viseu, and 1 from Leiria.

The storm caused significant damage to the forest industry in Portugal. At least €12.7 million (US$15.4 million) in economic losses occurred throughout 3,500 hectares (8,600 acres) of forest. Around 200–250 thousand pine saplings in forests located between Figueira da Foz and Leiria were destroyed, cutting production of resin. Leslie inflicted around €29.8 million (US$36.2 million) in damage to agriculture across the districts of Leiria, Coimbra, Aveiro, and Viseu. Approximately €10.5 million (US$12.4 million) in damage to annual crops occurred. Over 1,000 vehicles were damaged across the country. Damage from Leslie in Portugal was estimated to be around €120 million (US$145 million), with half of the total stemming from 28,000 insurance claims for storm damage.

==== Coimbra District ====
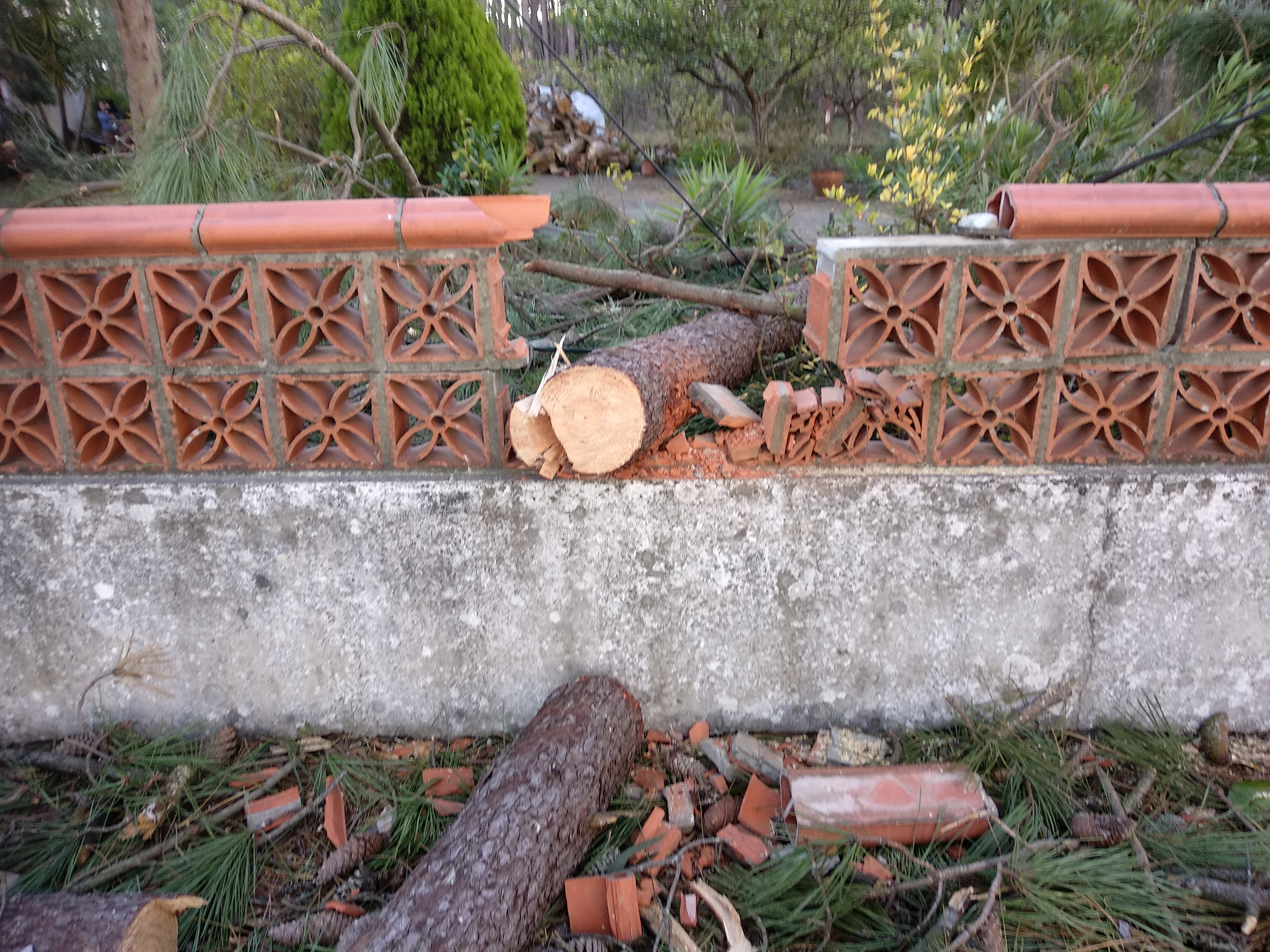
A wall damaged by a falling tree during the storm

The storm made landfall in Figueira da Foz, which is located 200 km (120 mi) north of Lisbon. Authorities in Lisbon requested that all residents remain indoors. Around 800 people took refuge in a concert hall in Figueira da Foz. Wind gusts of 176 km/h (109 mph) downed trees and traffic signs, with the former causing several traffic accidents. In the city, six vehicles were damaged by a collapsing building, and another five were damaged by falling trees. Multiple homes in the area were deroofed. Three schools and the Figueira da Foz District Hospital were damaged by the storm. Near the shoreline, a car was pulverized and a restaurant was reduced to rubble. A roof was ripped off a building and blown across an esplanade by strong winds. A high-voltage power pole collapsed in Leirosa, falling on a house; the roof of the house subsequently collapsed. A surf instruction center near Praia da Leirosa was lifted onto another property. Strong winds picked up a trailer and tossed it on top of another. At least 80 trailers were either damaged or destroyed in the park. Hundreds of residences, businesses, and fishing piers sustained damage. Figueira da Foz was considered the worst-hit municipality, with the storm inflicting €38 million (US$46.2 million) in damage.

At least 3,500 trees were downed near Serra da Boa Viagem alone. The core trees of the forest, which had survived two wildfires in 1993 and 2005 and a major storm in 2013, was largely destroyed. Falling trees smashed concrete picnic tables at a park. The roofs of four bungalows sustained damage, and the balcony cover and glass of another was shattered. The Casa do Parque suffered roof damage; six changing rooms experienced both internal and roof damage, and a dishwashing station was destroyed. Nearly 40 percent of the trees in the Choupal National Forest were either damaged or felled by Leslie.

In Soure, damage was estimated to be at least €1,000,000 (US$1,208,000), with around €600,000 (US$725,000) in damage being to sports infrastructure alone. Schools in the town were closed due to damage and power outages. Around 90 percent of the homes in 8 parishes were damaged by Leslie. The storm broke tiles on several streets and knocked down trees. A pavilion was deroofed in the village of Simões. Municipal authorities dispensed generators to multiple towns in the Soure municipality. In the Mira Municipality, regions were left without potable water, power, and outside contact for over a week. At least 5,000 homes sustained damage during the storm. Equipment and greenhouses also sustained damage. A hospital and firestation in Mira lost power during the storm; power was not restored until 14 October. Eight schools were closed in the municipality, due to a lack of water and power. The Equestrian Center of Montemor-o-Velho was almost entirely destroyed by the storm. A nursing home and a pavilion in Montemor-o-Velho were both deroofed. Another pavilion suffered damage to its supports, rendering it unusable. Pools were damaged in Condeixa-a-Nova, and three families were left homeless.

The power company EDP declared a state of emergency in Coimbra, as a result of damage to electrical infrastructure. A number of high voltage power poles were either felled or bent by the storm. At least 4,000 transformers were damaged by the storm. Several buildings owned by the University of Coimbra suffered damage to their ceilings. The university stadium and a botanical garden also sustained damage, while a radio tower was toppled during the storm. Over a dozen streets were blocked by fallen trees. The electric traction of trolleys was severely impaired across several streets in Coimbra, greatly restricting the availability of service. Scaffolding and signage were damaged across the municipality. National Road 1 was closed in two places between Mealhada and Coimbra due to fallen trees. In Senhor da Serra, solar panels used to power a school were damaged, which caused the school to close for a day. A sanctuary, a chapel, and seven greenhouses received roof damage. A sports field and over a dozen homes were also damaged.

==== Leiria District ====
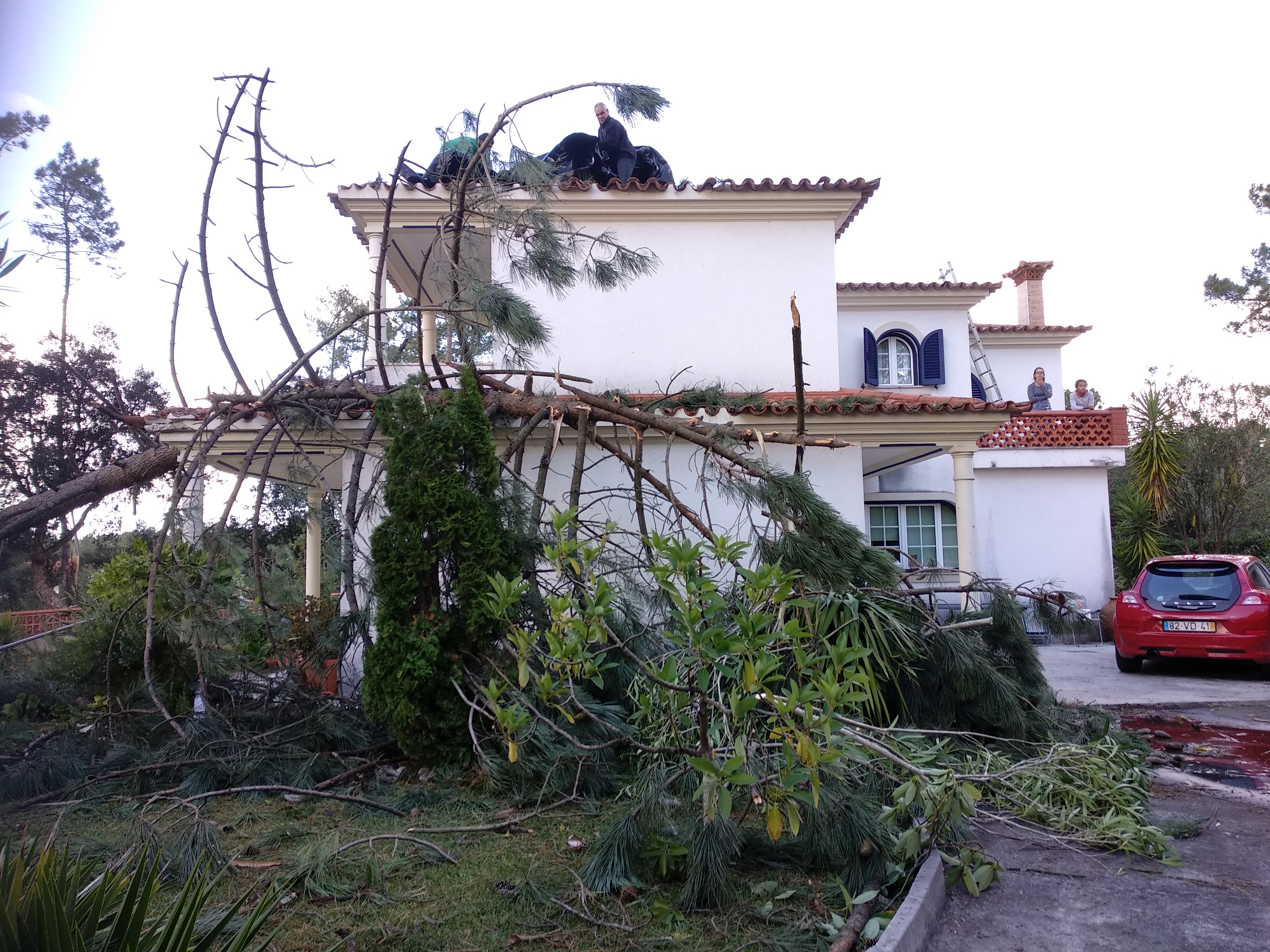
Segments of a felled tree on the roof of a house

In the Buçaco National Forest, Leslie left 60 people in the Palace Hotel and another 14 in houses cut off from the outside world for days. A man was injured in the Marinha Grande Municipality, Leira district, when a door was blown off a structure and struck him. In the municipality, a lighthouse was deroofed by the storm. A hotel had a window broken, a balcony destroyed, and suffered damage to its swimming pool and waterpark. Nearly 100 residences in the municipality sustained damage. The roof of Maritime Police facility was lifted away, and the structure had multiple walls destroyed. A restaurant was destroyed at Praia do Pedrógão. Winds blew away tents at the Praia da Vieira, prompting the evacuation of 60 people. Damage in the municipality was estimated to be €5 million (US$6.1 million). Around 50 campers were evacuated in Alcobaça. The A17 highway connecting Leiria to Aveiro was closed due to fallen trees. A gas leak also occurred at a restaurant.

Four parishes in Pombal municipality lacked power and water, and communication services were cut. A school was closed due to a lack of power. In the parish of Louriçal, powerlines and trees had fallen in several locations.

==== Aveiro and Porto Districts ====
The European women's roller hockey championship, which was taking place in Mealhada, was stopped in its final minutes after the roof of the sports facility was damaged, windows shattered, and debris littered the track. Players took refuge in locker rooms. Shipyards and a pavilion were damaged in Mealhada municipality, and a cafeteria sustained damage in Alameda municipality.

A blackout occurred in Porto on a street in Trofa after a street light toppled over. Two metro stations and several pavilions were utilized as shelters for the homeless in Lisbon during the storm. Around 30 residences were left without power in Valongo after a high-voltage power pole toppled. The Mestra Silva sank off the coast of Esmoriz during the storm, killing one and leaving another three missing; the captain of the ship was rescued and hospitalized.

==== Other districts ====
Leslie brought wind gusts of 100–120 km/h (62–75 mph) to the Madeira archipelago. A vault at the Convento da Saudação in Évora partially collapsed due to strong winds from Leslie. A 300-year-old ash tree near the Largo da Misericórdia sustained damage during the storm. Scaffolding attached to buildings collapsed in Lisbon. One person was killed by a falling tree in Amieiro. At least 70 trees fell and 73 structures were damaged in Viseu municipality. Strong waves from Leslie deposited sand at the entrance to the Albufeira Lagoon as the storm moved ashore. Following the storm, water current velocities were greatly diminished for multiple weeks, causing the lagoon's entrance to close entirely by 9 November.

=== Spain ===
Leslie brought torrential rainfall and flooding to the autonomous communities of Andalusia, Catalonia, Castilla-La Mancha, the Balearic Islands, and Valencia. The storm caused at least 17 injuries across Spain. Heavy rainfall caused the Sió river to overflow in Catalonia. At least 45 landslides occurred in the region. Around 247 firefighters responded to over 1,000 emergency calls in Catalonia. In Castilla y León, 100 km/h (62 mph) winds downed trees and branches on roads in dozens of locations. The R1, R2, and R11 lines of the Rodalies de Catalunya and five roads, including the C-17 highway in Barcelona, were closed as a result of fallen trees. Girona and Barcelona experienced 14,000 power outages and 12 roads were impassable due to floodwaters; the latter forced the suspension of school transportation services for six municipalities. A gas station roof was blown off in the Malgrat del Mar neighborhood in Barcelona. Six people had to be evacuated from surrounding properties when a building collapsed in Tortosa. Over 200 mm (7.9 in) of rain fell in Montseny, and 209.3 mm (8.24 in) of rain fell in Viladrau. Strong winds caused a wall to collapse in Santo Ángel, forcing the closure of a road. The Albujón highway was closed in Cartagena, due to the storm. A fair was canceled in Avenida de Los Toreros after a tree fell and roofs of two stalls were ripped off. The Toledo Cathedral sustained damage to its cornice, with a 20 kg (44 lb) piece falling off. A tunnel flooded in Beniaján, trapping a vehicle.

Several skates turned upside down in El Prat de Llobregat, and in Palomares, the masts of two skates were snapped and another was bent. Detritus plant matter and other dregs were swept onto the Sant Salvador beach by the storm, covering most of it. An Algerian Kilo-class submarine and its accompanying tugboat, Al Moussif, anchored in the Spanish-controlled Ares Estuary during the storm.

An electrical cable snapped in Zamora, sparking a ditch fire and leaving 390 residences without power. A crane toppled over, striking a building in Soria.

=== France ===
Leslie and another system combined to cause severe flooding in the Aude, which prompted the issuance of a red alert for the department; the floods were considered to have been the worst since 1891. A 12-hour rainfall total of 295 mm (11.6 in) was reported in the town of Trèbes. Around 1,000 people were evacuated in the Pezens Municipality after a dam overflowed. In the village of Veillardonnel, houses and streets were flooded and vehicles were swept away by floodwaters. In Veillardonnel and Conques-sue-Orbiel, floodwaters reached the height of first-floor windows. The Aude River rose over 7 m (23 ft) to reach 7.6 m (25 ft) in Trèbes. In Puichéric, the Aude River reached a level never before seen, besting the previous record which was set in October 1871. Floodwaters up to 1 m (3.3 ft) deep flooded homes in Villegailhenc. A bridge also collapsed in the town. At least 210 mm (8.3 in) of rain fell in Hérault. Around 6,000 people lost power in the Aude and another 2,000 in Hérault. Police asked citizens in the Aude to remain in their houses and stay off flooded roadways.

The Leclerc promenade in Sète was closed due to 7.6 m (25 ft)-high surf and 111 km/h (69 mph) wind gusts. A total of 15 people were killed throughout the Aude as a result of the floods: six in Trèbes, three in Villegailhenc, two in Villalier, one in Veillardonnel, one in Carcassonne, and one in Saint-Couat-d'Aude. At least 75 additional people were injured in the department. Flooding interrupted railway traffic along the Béziers-Narbonne section and other routes in Carcassonne. Several roads in Carcassonne were blocked by felled trees, and cars were either swept away by floodwaters or destroyed. Schools and universities throughout the city were closed from 15 to 16 October. In the villages surrounding Carcassonne, flash flooding overturned vehicles, damaged roadways, and caused homes to collapse. Multiple waterspouts occurred near the region bordering Spain. At least 700 municipalities experienced flood damage, with an estimated total of €220 million (US$254 million).

=== Elsewhere ===
The Alta, a freighter ship, experienced an unrepairable mechanical issue. The United States Coast Guard and the crew considered towing the ship, but ultimately abandoned it due to the nearby Hurricane Leslie. The ship ran ashore in Ireland on 16 February 2020.

Météo-France issued a yellow alert for the overseas territory of Martinique on 3 October due to high surf generated by Leslie. The highest surf experienced in Martinique was 2.5 m (8.2 ft) in the Dominica Channel.

From late September through early October, Leslie brought high surf to the East Coast of the United States, inducing the highest swell observed in some locations for years. Leslie also generated the single-longest period of tropical swells observed in the Outer Banks in the last 20 years, producing surf at chest height or higher. The highest surf was observed on 26–28 September, when Leslie was a powerful extratropical cyclone with hurricane-force winds. Leslie and a low-pressure system inhibited a trough from tracking eastward from 29 to 30 September, causing fog to persist for 32 hours in Ferryland, Newfoundland.

== Aftermath ==
=== Portugal ===
A marketplace was closed in Figueira da Foz due to roof damage, causing losses of €700 thousand (US$853 thousand) to local fishermen. Tree removal work began immediately after the storm; around 150 trucks were mobilized to remove the fallen trees. However, the Institute for the Conservation of Nature and Forests estimated that the removal work would take at least 6 months. Around 80 percent of the trees planted in pine forests along the coast of Leiria, in areas heavily affected by wildfires and Leslie, died. In order to aid the recovery of the forest, plantings would continue for multiple years. Roads were also to be improved as a part of the project, which had a financial backing of €18 million (US$21.9 million). Around €220,000 (US$268,000) were donated to fund the removal and sawing of felled trees in the Bussaco National Forest. Additional funds were donated to finance the planting of over 35,000 additional trees. Near the Palace Hotel, 100 trees were planted in an area damaged by Leslie in order to honor the life of Nelson Mandela. Despite being considered a public interest, the 300-year-old ash tree was cut down on 14 November 2019.

Months after Leslie, students protested about the condition of the College of Arts building at the University of Coimbra, which was one of those damaged during the storm. In Chernache, the Aerodrome Bissaya Barreto was closed from 30 May–7 June 2019, due to additional problems after Leslie had removed its windsock. Around 10,000 personnel were mobilized to deal with fallen trees and landslides in Mira. Municipal authorities worked to clear fallen trees and repair broken walls and signage. Authorities activated the emergency municipal plan in Montemor-o-Velho, Figueira da Foz, Condeixa-a-Nova, Soure, Coimbra, and Mira to aid with cleanup and relief efforts. The district emergency plan was activated for Coimbra district. Fifty generators were provided by Pombal municipal officials to restore power to residences and small businesses. The Portuguese government anticipated an expenditure of €36 million (US$43.8 million) would be required to aid the forest industry. Fisheries near Figueira da Foz operated at below normal capacity through 2020, due to a reduction in sardine supply that occurred after Leslie moved through the area. Although the Portuguese government agreed to cover 70 percent of the costs of reconstruction for the Equestrian Center of Montemor-o-Velho, it had not provided the funds two years post-storm.

Initially, on 27 November 2018, the Portuguese government rejected a proposal to provide relief funds for victims of the storm. The government provided €1.4 million (US$1.7 million) out of a maximum of €8.3 million (US$10.1 million) in aid to 24 municipalities in 2019. They provided another €3.6 million (US$4.3 million) to those municipalities in 2020. The legislature allocated €20 million (US$24.3 million) in aid to the agricultural sector. The Portuguese government opened up €15 million (US$17.7 million) in relief funds for farmers who sustained damage to buildings, equipment, livestock, and permanent crops. At least seven companies received financial aid totalling €391,000 (US$478,000). Social organizations that experienced large financial woes had not received relief funding from the Portuguese government two years after the storm. The legislative body was criticised for being slow in authorising the release of funds to these organizations. The Coimbra City Council approved a measure on 30 June to repair the Celas Integrated Sports Center and a building at the Campo Municipal da Arregaça, both of which were severely damaged by Leslie. Despite repairs having taken place at the sports center, it remained closed nearly a year after Leslie passed through the region.

In 2021, the Rural Development Program provided €98,000 (US$120,000) in aid to help repair damage caused in the Choupal National Forest. At least 5,000 new trees were to be planted and 700 damaged ones either cut down or trimmed. To aid recovery efforts, €5 million (US$6.1 million) in funds were approved for a recovery plan for the Leiria National Forest in the Marinha Grande Municipality. The plan included the planting of at least 230 trees to restore the forest after Leslie and a 2017 fire destroyed most of it. The Miranda do Corvo city council approved €74,850 (US$91,400) in funds to rebuild the Senhor da Serra Pavilion, which was entirely destroyed by the storm. The council also approved €34,085 (US$41,600) in aid to repair the headquarters for the Vale do Açor Recreational, Cultural and Sports Association.

=== France ===
After the storm, victims in the Aude proceeded to shelters or lodged with their neighbors, and schools were closed. Around 700 firefighters, 160 police officers, and rescue agencies took part in cleanup and rescue operations in the department. Seven helicopters and one plane were mobilized for search and rescue missions in the Aude. Authorities responded to at least 250 emergencies. The French Insurance Federation recorded 35,000 claims of damage in regards to the floods caused by Leslie, with 27,000 of those occurring in the Aude. Collectively, €17 million (US$20 million) in advances were paid to claimants.

== See also ==
- Weather of 2018
- Tropical cyclones in 2018
- List of Azores hurricanes
- Tropical cyclone effects in Europe
- Other storms of the same name
- 1842 Spain hurricane
- Hurricane Ginger (1971)
- Hurricane Vince (2005)
- Hurricane Nadine (2012)
- Hurricane Ophelia (2017)
- Subtropical Storm Alpha (2020)
