= Subtropical Storm Alpha (2020) =

Atlantic subtropical storm

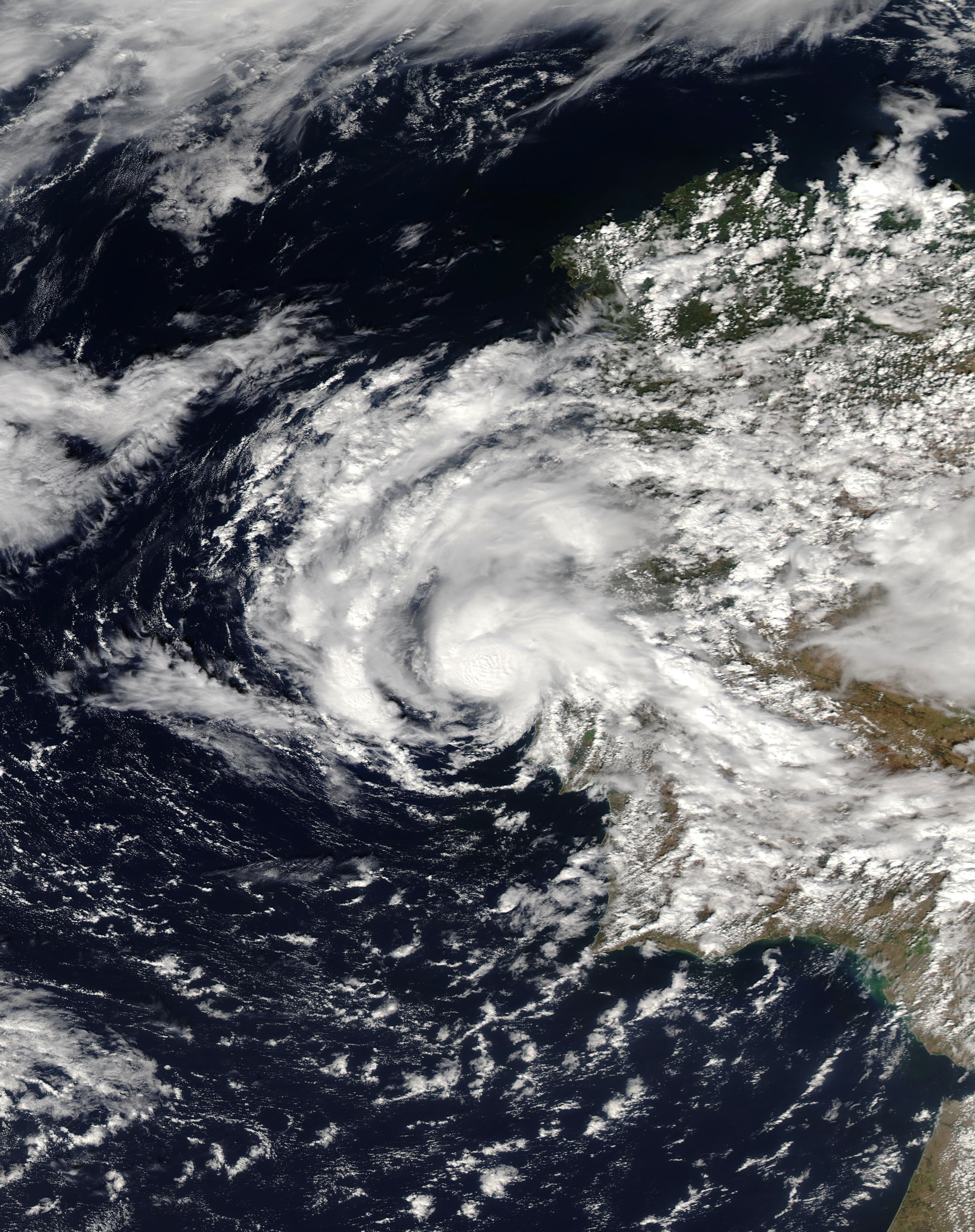
- Alpha shortly before landfall in Portugal on 18 September

Meteorological history
- Formed: 17 September 2020
- Dissipated: 19 September 2020

Subtropical storm
- 1-minute sustained (SSHWS/NWS)
- Highest winds: 50 mph (85 km/h)
- Lowest pressure: 996 mbar (hPa); 29.41 inHg (992 mbar (29.29 inHg) while extratropical)

Overall effects
- Fatalities: 1 indirect
- Damage: >$24.2 million (2020 USD)
- Areas affected: Portugal, Spain
- IBTrACS
- Part of the 2020 Atlantic hurricane season

Subtropical Storm Alpha was the first subtropical cyclone ever observed to make landfall in mainland Portugal. The twenty-second tropical or subtropical cyclone and twenty-first named storm of the extremely active and record-breaking 2020 Atlantic hurricane season, Alpha originated from a large non-tropical low that was first monitored by the National Hurricane Center on 15 September. Initially not anticipated to transition into a tropical cyclone, the low gradually tracked south-southeastward for several days with little development. By early on 17 September, the low had separated from its frontal features and exhibited sufficient organization to be classified as a subtropical cyclone, as it approached the Iberian Peninsula, becoming a subtropical storm around that time. Alpha then made landfall just south of Figueira da Foz, Portugal during the evening of 18 September, then rapidly weakened as it moved over the mountainous terrain of Northeastern Portugal. The system degenerated into a remnant low on 19 September, when it was last noted.

At least two EF1 tornadoes were confirmed in Portugal, and one person was killed due to strong winds in Spain. Impacts from Alpha were rather minor as a subtropical cyclone, although Alpha produced some significant rainfall and gusty winds in both Portugal and Spain as a remnant low. Total damages from the storm were estimated to be greater than €20 million (US$24.2 million), with a majority of the damage occurring in Portugal.

== Meteorological history ==
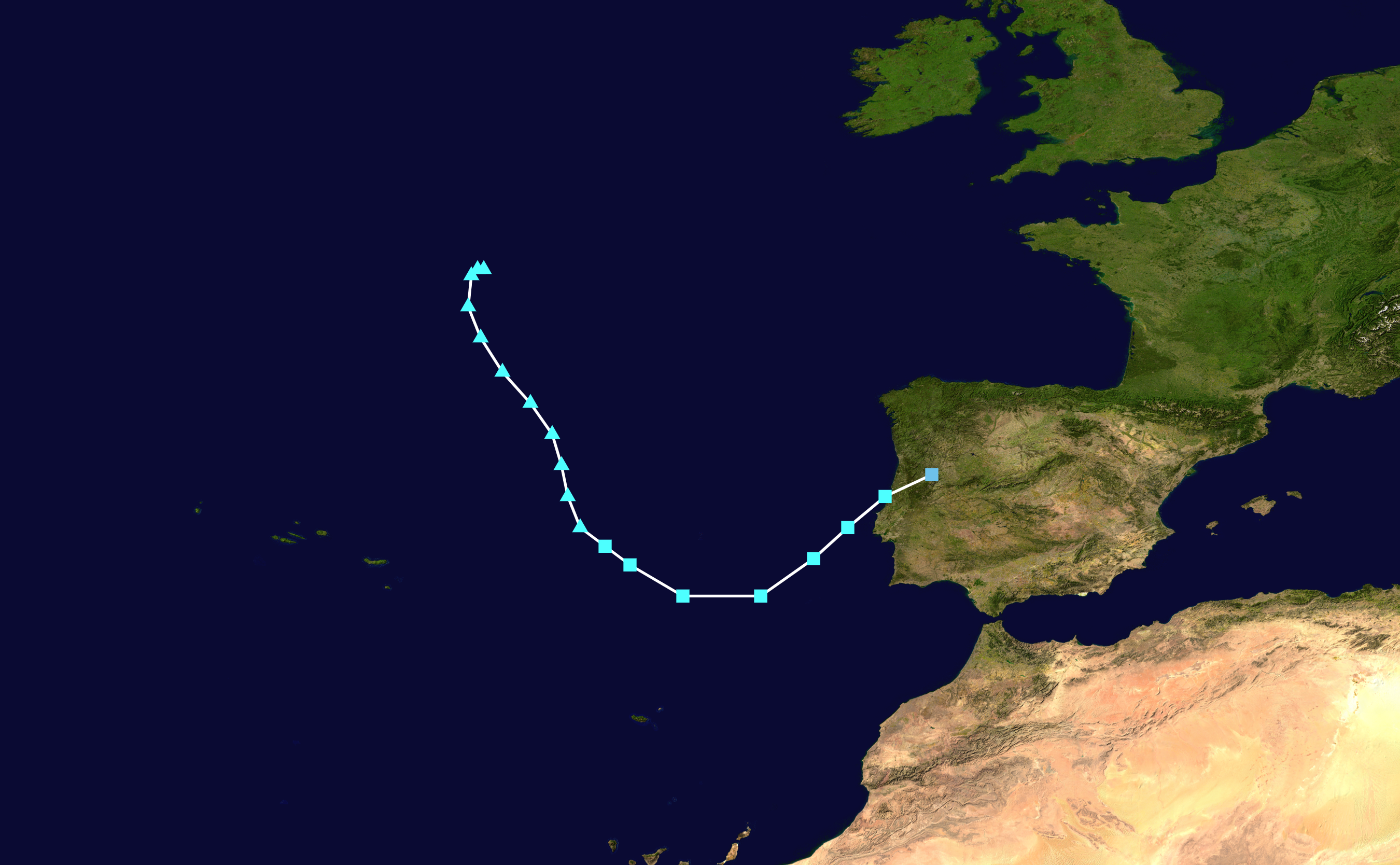
Map plotting the storm's track and intensity, according to the Saffir–Simpson scale Map key Saffir–Simpson scale Tropical depression (≤38 mph, ≤62 km/h) Tropical storm (39–73 mph, 63–118 km/h) Category 1 (74–95 mph, 119–153 km/h) Category 2 (96–110 mph, 154–177 km/h) Category 3 (111–129 mph, 178–208 km/h) Category 4 (130–156 mph, 209–251 km/h) Category 5 (≥157 mph, ≥252 km/h) Unknown Storm type Tropical cyclone Subtropical cyclone Extratropical cyclone, remnant low, tropical disturbance, or monsoon depression

Alpha originated from a large, extratropical low-pressure area, which developed over the Northeastern Atlantic Ocean on 14 September. As a strong upper-level trough dug southeastward and became a cut-off low about 500 nmi (580 mi; 930 km) north of the Azores, the interaction between the low and a surface front promoted the formation of a strong frontal low, which rapidly deepened and reached its extratropical peak that day, with maximum 1-minute sustained winds as high as 112 km/h (70 mph) and a minimum central atmospheric pressure of 992 mbar (29.3 inHg). By this time, the extratropical cyclone had a very large radius of gale-force winds expanding over 500 km (270 nmi; 310 mi) from its center of circulation. The low was initially very slow-moving, but began to dip southeastward and weaken by 15 September when the National Hurricane Center (NHC) first began to monitor the system for possible development into a tropical or subtropical cyclone. This was because the system was expected to track close to a region of unusually-warm sea surface temperatures to the west of Portugal of around 22 °C (72 °F), though these temperatures would still typically be too cold to support tropical cyclogenesis.

The size of the low's wind field continued gradually decreasing on 16 September, as some of its frontal features gradually became less defined, although the NHC only highlighted a low (20%) chance of development at this time, operationally. Nonetheless, convection, or thunderstorm activity, became more concentrated and organized near the center of the low, and a newly formed central low soon became the dominant feature within the larger extratropical system. In post-season analysis, the NHC estimated that Alpha had developed as a subtropical storm at 06:00 UTC on 17 September, as the thunderstorm activity associated with the smaller low feature became well-organized; in real time, advisories on the system did not begin until almost 35 hours later. Alpha accelerated to the northeast, and a combination of radar imagery from Portugal, scatterometer passes, and satellite-derived wind data revealed Subtropical Storm Alpha had peaked around 00:00 UTC on 18 September, just about 417 km (225 nmi; 259 mi) off the coast of Portugal, while the storm was producing 1-minute sustained winds up to 80 km/h (50 mph).

Alpha maintained its intensity up to its landfall about 17 km (11 mi) south of Figueira da Foz, Portugal, around 18:40 UTC that day. The storm's final minimum central pressure estimate of 996 mbar (29.4 inHg) was based on a surface pressure of 999 mbar (29.5 inHg) being recorded in Monte Real, Portugal, well north of the cyclone's landfall point. After landfall, the small low-level circulation associated with Alpha began to quickly decay, as the storm moved inland, and the cyclone weakened to a subtropical depression at 0:00 UTC on 19 September. Alpha degenerated into a remnant low later that day, as it moved over the mountainous terrain of Northeastern Portugal.

== Preparations and impact ==
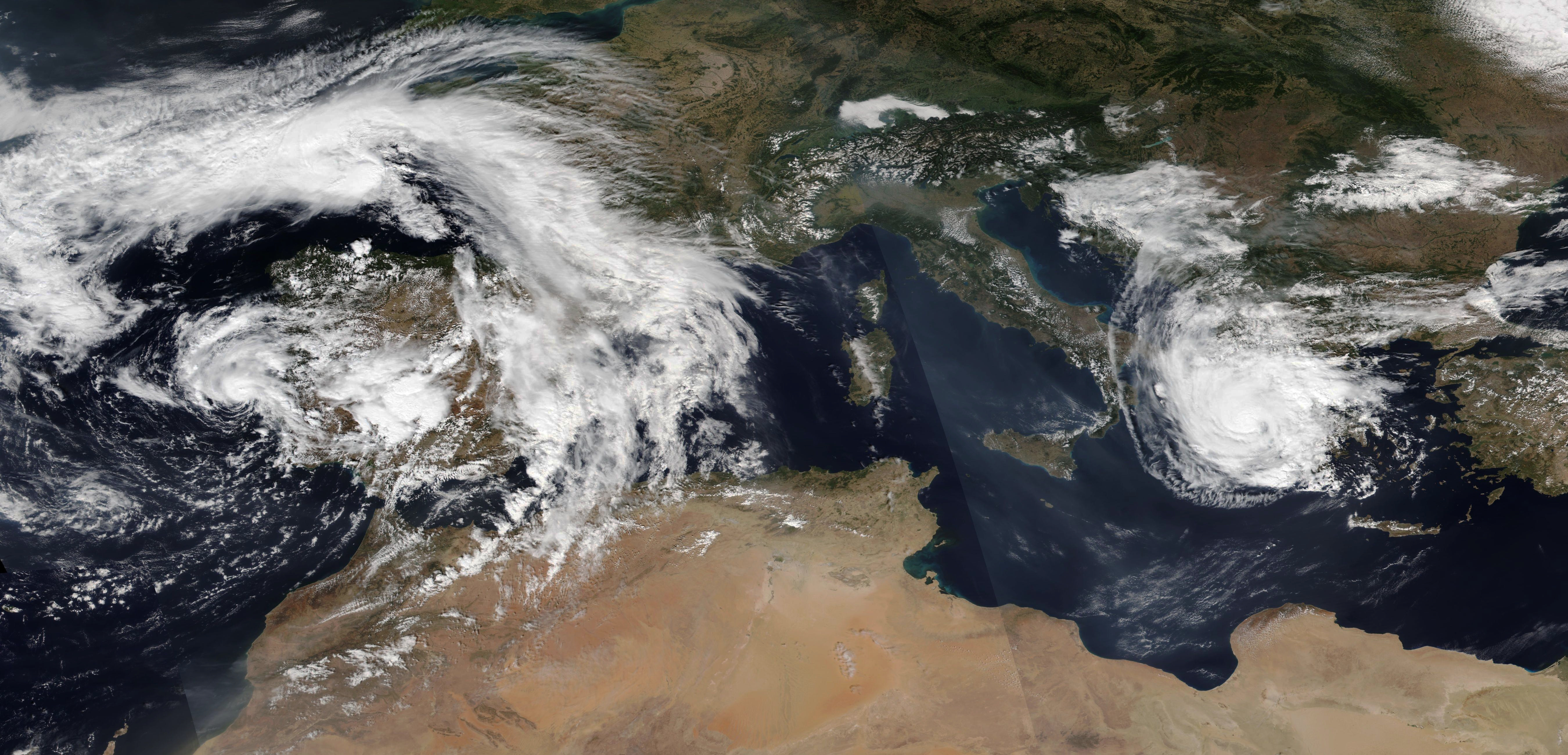
Subtropical Storm Alpha (left) making landfall in Portugal and Medicane Ianos (right) in the Mediterranean approaching Greece on 18 September.

In preparation for Alpha in Portugal on 18 September, orange warnings were raised by the Portuguese Institute of the Sea and Atmosphere (IPMA), due to the threat of high wind and heavy rain in the Coimbra and Leiria districts of Portugal. Winds due to Alpha caused widespread power outages, uprooted trees, and damaged dozens of vehicles. A squall line producing gusts as high as 80 km/h (50 mph) associated with the system spawned at least two confirmed tornadoes of EF1 intensity; one near the town of Palmela, which caused no reported damage, and one in Beja, which uprooted around 100 trees and damaged 30–40 vehicles. There were some reports of minor roof damage to some structures as well, deemed to be related to the Beja tornado. Street flash flooding, as a result of heavy rainfall became prominent in some cities in western Portugal; the flooding was most severe in Setúbal. 68.2 mm (2.69 in) of rain fell in Porto, while wind gusts reached as high as 90 km/h (56 mph) in Monte Real. High surf caused by Alpha in Carcavelos Beach (Portuguese: Praia de Carcavelos) caused minor coastal erosion. Winds brought down a radio tower in Leiria, where it was reported to have been damaged beyond repair. Throughout the country, there were 203 reports of trees uprooted, 174 reports of minor flooding, 88 structures damaged and 82 roads blocked by debris. Of these reports, 143 were in Leiria District and 135 were in Lisbon District. Alpha caused an estimated €20 million (US$24.2 million) in damage in Portugal before the region would later be hit by another significant storm, Windstorm Barbara, in late October.

In Spain, orange warnings were also raised by the State Meteorological Agency (AEMET) for the Spanish autonomous communities of Madrid, Extremadura, Aragon, and Catalonia as Alpha moved into Portugal late on 18 September, citing a risk of heavy rain, hail, and strong wind gusts. Yellow alerts were also issued in Castile and León and Castilla–La Mancha. Rain and windy conditions spread further inland into Spain, while the remnants moved eastward. Castilla–La Mancha's news agency reported that uprooted trees and minor floods had occurred in the community during Alpha, while several water rescues were carried out around midday of 19 September. The fast-moving cluster of thunderstorms associated with the remnants of Alpha produced 38 mm (1.5 in) of rain in half an hour in Valencia before the remnants exited into the Mediterranean Sea. Wind gusts of up to 94 km/h (58 mph) were reported in the town of Coria, Cáceres. The remnants of Alpha caused a train with 25 passengers to derail in Madrid, although no one was seriously injured. A woman died in Calzadilla after the roof of a cattle shed collapsed on top of her. Alpha also caused lightning on Ons Island, which led to an isolated forest fire.

== Distinctions and naming ==
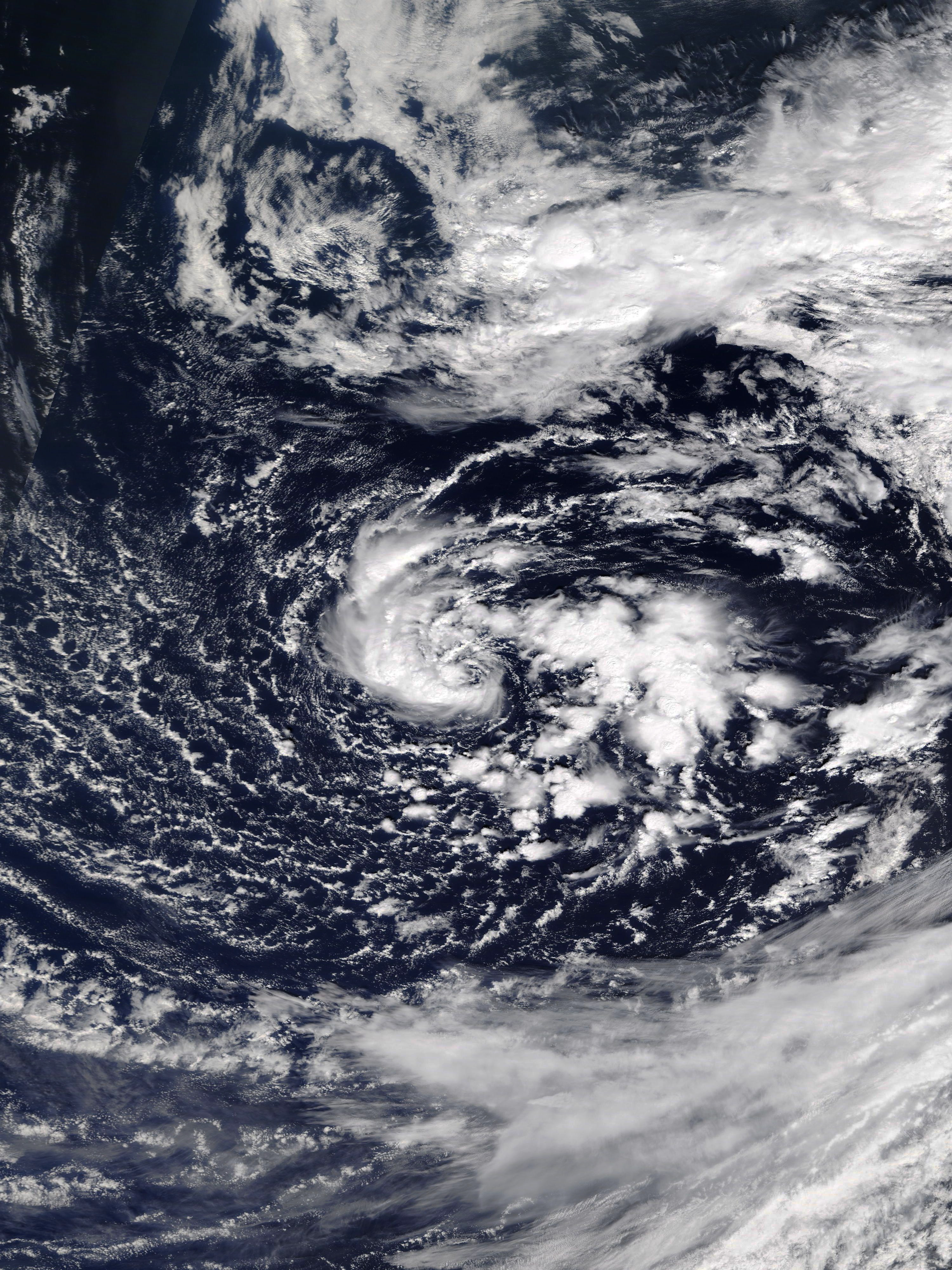
Alpha upon first reaching subtropical-storm status on 17 September

Alpha was the earliest 22nd Atlantic tropical or subtropical storm on record, surpassing the old mark of October 17, set by Hurricane Wilma in 2005. It developed at an unusually eastern longitude – 18.0°W; only Tropical Storm Christine in 1973 developed farther to the east, at 14.0°W. Upon landfall, Alpha became the first recorded tropical or subtropical cyclone known to have made landfall in Portugal. Additionally, Cyclone Ianos was approaching its first landfall in Greece at the time; this marked the first time in recorded history that two storms of subtropical or tropical nature impacted continental Europe simultaneously.

The 2020 season was the second (along with 2005) in which an alphabetic list of 21 storm names had been exhausted, necessitating use of the Greek alphabet auxiliary list. In March 2021, the World Meteorological Organization replaced that auxiliary list with a new 21-name supplemental list. As a result, the name Alpha will not be used to name another Atlantic hurricane.

== See also ==
- Weather of 2020
- Tropical cyclones in 2020
- Timeline of the 2020 Atlantic hurricane season
- 1842 Spain hurricane – only storm known to have made landfall in the Iberian Peninsula at hurricane strength
- Hurricane Leslie (2018) – long-lived Atlantic hurricane whose extratropical remnant made landfall in Portugal
- Hurricane Vince (2005) – made landfall in Spain as a tropical depression
- Hurricane Pablo (2019) – similar track and location
