= List of storms named Vince =

The name Vince has been used for three tropical cyclones worldwide, one in the Atlantic Ocean and two in the Australian region

In the Atlantic:

- Hurricane Vince (2005) – formed southeast of the Azores, made landfall on the Iberian Peninsula as a tropical depression

In the Australian region:

- Cyclone Vince (2011) – formed and remained off the coast of Western Australia
- Cyclone Vince (2025) – Category 4 tropical cyclone, churned in the open ocean.
