= Tropical Storm Leslie (2000) =

Atlantic tropical storm in 2000

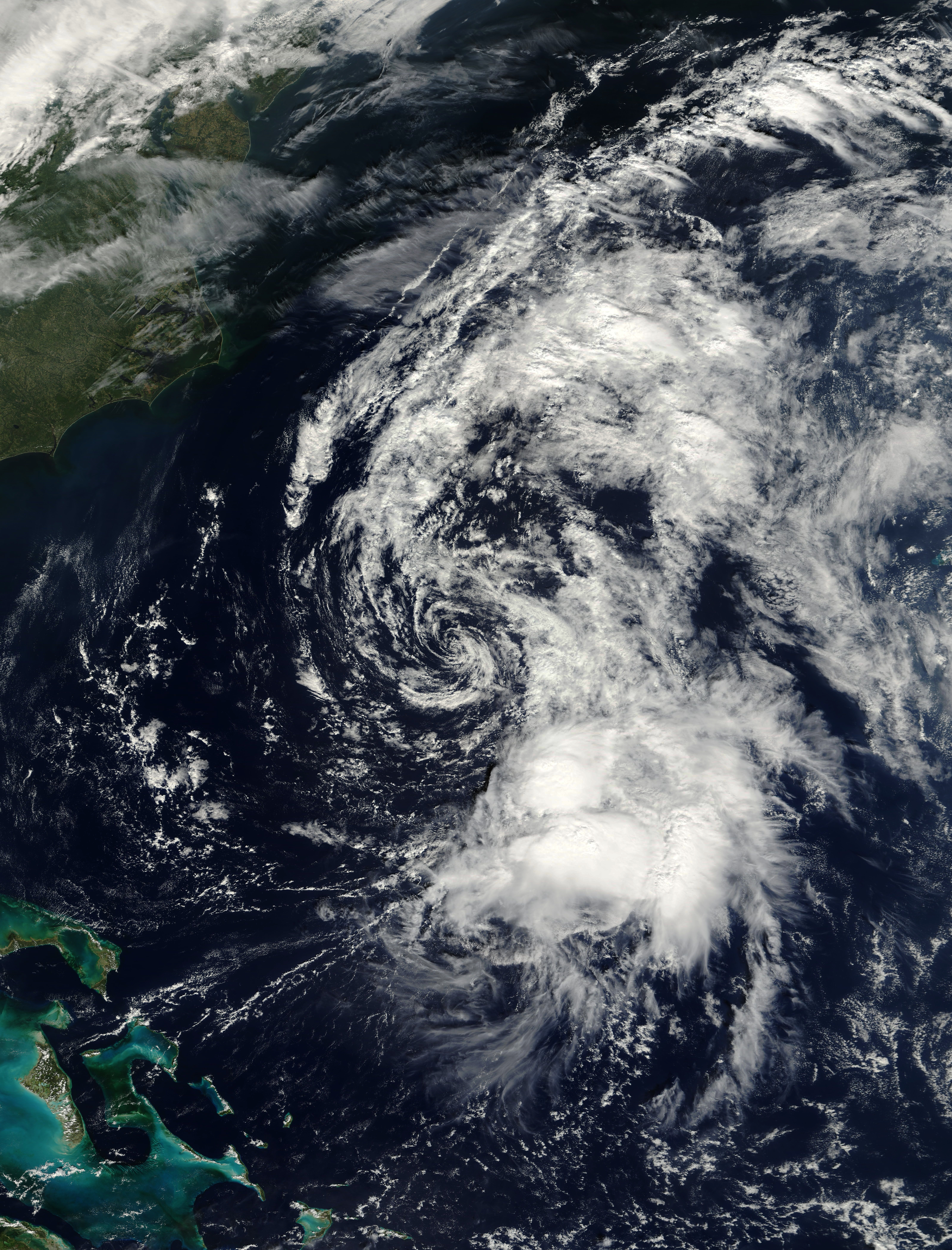
- Tropical Storm Leslie off the Southeastern United States on October 6

Meteorological history
- Formed: October 4, 2000
- Extratropical: October 7, 2000
- Dissipated: October 12, 2000

Tropical storm
- 1-minute sustained (SSHWS/NWS)
- Highest winds: 45 mph (75 km/h)
- Lowest pressure: 1006 mbar (hPa); 29.71 inHg

Overall effects
- Fatalities: 3 total
- Damage: $950 million (2000 USD)
- Areas affected: Cuba, Bahamas, Florida, Bermuda, Saint Pierre and Miquelon, Newfoundland, Western Europe
- IBTrACS
- Part of the 2000 Atlantic hurricane season

Tropical Storm Leslie was a weak, short-lived tropical cyclone in October 2000 that had significant impacts in its developmental stage. The 12th named storm of the 2000 Atlantic hurricane season, Leslie formed on October 4 over eastern Florida as a subtropical cyclone. It originated from a tropical wave that interacted with a stalled cold front over southern Florida. Their interaction produced intense rainbands across the Miami metropolitan area, with the heaviest rainfall on October 3. After moving away from the state, the weather system became more organized and evolved into a tropical cyclone. Leslie briefly threatened the island of Bermuda while moving northeastward, but it passed northwest of the island. On October 7, the storm transitioned into an extratropical cyclone over the open Atlantic Ocean, later moving over southeastern Newfoundland. The storm that was formerly Leslie intensified before merging with another larger extratropical storm near the British Isles on October 10.

The precursor to Leslie produced torrential rainfall across Florida, reaching 17.5 in (440 mm) in South Miami. The weather system set daily rainfall records for both Miami and Key West. The flooding damaged thousands of houses and caused three deaths. Damage in southern Florida totaled $950 million (2000 USD), (Note: All damage figures are in 2000 USD, unless otherwise noted) around half of which was from agricultural damage. After the flooding, portions of south Florida were declared a disaster area.

== Meteorological history ==
Map plotting the storm's track and intensity, according to the Saffir–Simpson scale Map key Saffir–Simpson scale Tropical depression (≤38 mph, ≤62 km/h) Tropical storm (39–73 mph, 63–118 km/h) Category 1 (74–95 mph, 119–153 km/h) Category 2 (96–110 mph, 154–177 km/h) Category 3 (111–129 mph, 178–208 km/h) Category 4 (130–156 mph, 209–251 km/h) Category 5 (≥157 mph, ≥252 km/h) Unknown Storm type Tropical cyclone Subtropical cyclone Extratropical cyclone, remnant low, tropical disturbance, or monsoon depression

The origins of Leslie were from a tropical wave that entered the eastern Caribbean Sea on September 27. The National Hurricane Center (NHC) noted that the wave was likely the same one that earlier spawned Hurricane Isaac a week earlier. Once over the Caribbean Sea, the wave produced a disorganized area of convection, or thunderstorms over northern South America. The system emerged from Colombia into the central Caribbean Sea on September 29, where over the next two days it moved around the periphery of Hurricane Keith. By October 2, a mid-level circulation had developed within the thunderstorms, located just south of western Cuba near Isla de la Juventud. Moving northward, the circulation crossed Cuba and entered the southeastern Gulf of Mexico early on October 3. The NOAA Hurricane Hunters investigated the structure of the system that day, observing an elongated trough, but a lack of a surface circulation center. The trough interacted with a stalled cold front to produce a large area of intense thunderstorms over southeastern Florida. Around 00:00 UTC on October 4, (Note: All dates are in Coordinated Universal Time unless otherwise specified.) the mid-level circulation moved ashore Florida near Sarasota, and proceeded to the east. By 12:00 UTC that day, a surface circulation developed near Orlando. At this time, the NHC designated the system as Subtropical Depression One. This marked the first time the NHC designated a subtropical cyclone in real time since a subtropical storm in April 1992. The designation as a subtropical cyclone was based on the depression's structure, with the strongest winds 175 mi (275 km) to the east of the center. An upper-level shortwave trough may have also played a role in the depression's development.

About six hours after its formation, the depression moved offshore eastern Florida near Daytona Beach. The NHC assessed that the nearby upper-level trough would help the subtropical cyclone strengthen by "sheltering" the system from westerly wind shear, and by providing upper-level diffluence. As the depression continued eastward, its circulation moved closer to the convection, signaling its transition to a tropical cyclone. The Hurricane Hunters flew into the system on October 5 and observed gale-force winds, as well as a contraction of the system's wind field. Based on observations, the NHC upgraded and redesignated the system as Tropical Storm Leslie around 12:00 UTC on October 5. NHC forecaster James Franklin noted that Leslie was "by no means a classic tropical cyclone... that nature produces a whole spectrum of different kinds of cyclones, and that they do not always neatly fit into the small number of classifications that we have available for use in our advisories." At the time of its naming, Leslie was located about 230 mi (370 km) east of St. Augustine, Florida.

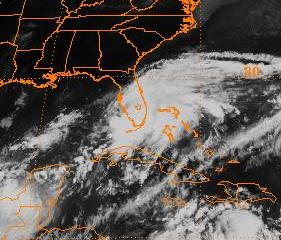
The precursor trough to Leslie over Florida, with Hurricane Keith visible over the Yucatán Peninsula.

The NHC anticipated that Leslie would intensify further, potentially to a peak of 60 mph (95 km/h), although they also noted the possibility that wind shear would remain high enough to prevent much intensification. Ultimately, Leslie attained maximum sustained winds of 45 mph (70 km/h) on October 6, with a minimum barometric pressure of 1,006 mbar (29.7 inHg). However, the circulation was largely exposed at the time, and was becoming elongated as it interacted with an approaching cold front. Late on October 7, Leslie transitioned into an extratropical cyclone as it became entangled with the cold front, while located about 375 mi (600 km) north of Bermuda. The cyclone accelerated to the northeast, moving over southeastern Newfoundland on October 8. The remnants of Leslie turned to the east over the north Atlantic Ocean, strengthening to reach winds of 70 mph (110 km/h) late on October 10. The extratropical storm became a bomb cyclone around this time as it merged with another cyclone over the British Isles, which had stalled over the area for a few days.

== Preparations ==
In advance of the flooding in South Florida, Miami's National Weather Service office issued a flood watch at 15:09 UTC on October 2, anticipating 8 to 9 in (200 to 230 mm) of rainfall. This was about 30 hours before the onset of flood conditions. The Miami NWS based their assessment on computer models, which predicted rainfall totals roughly half of what would ultimately occur. At 19:44 UTC on October 3, the agency followed issued an urban flood advisory for eastern Broward and Miami-Dade counties; this was followed 57 minutes later by a flood warning, which occurred 95 minutes before the first reports of floodwaters entering buildings. At Miami International Airport, flights had to be rerouted to other airports in the state. President Bill Clinton canceled an in-person appearance for a fundraiser due to the floods, and instead spoke by telephone. All public schools in Miami-Dade county closed on April 4, while Barry University canceled night classes due to the flood. Two shelters opened in Miami-Dade County. Officials advised residents to boil water if their private wells were contaminated. Due to the event, Florida governor Jeb Bush declared a state of emergency.

While Leslie was moving away from Florida, it posed a threat to Bermuda, prompting officials to issue a tropical storm watch at 0300 UTC on October 6. Six hours later, tropical storm watch was upgraded to a tropical storm warning. However, the storm passed well to the west, and the warnings were dropped late on October 6.

== Impact ==
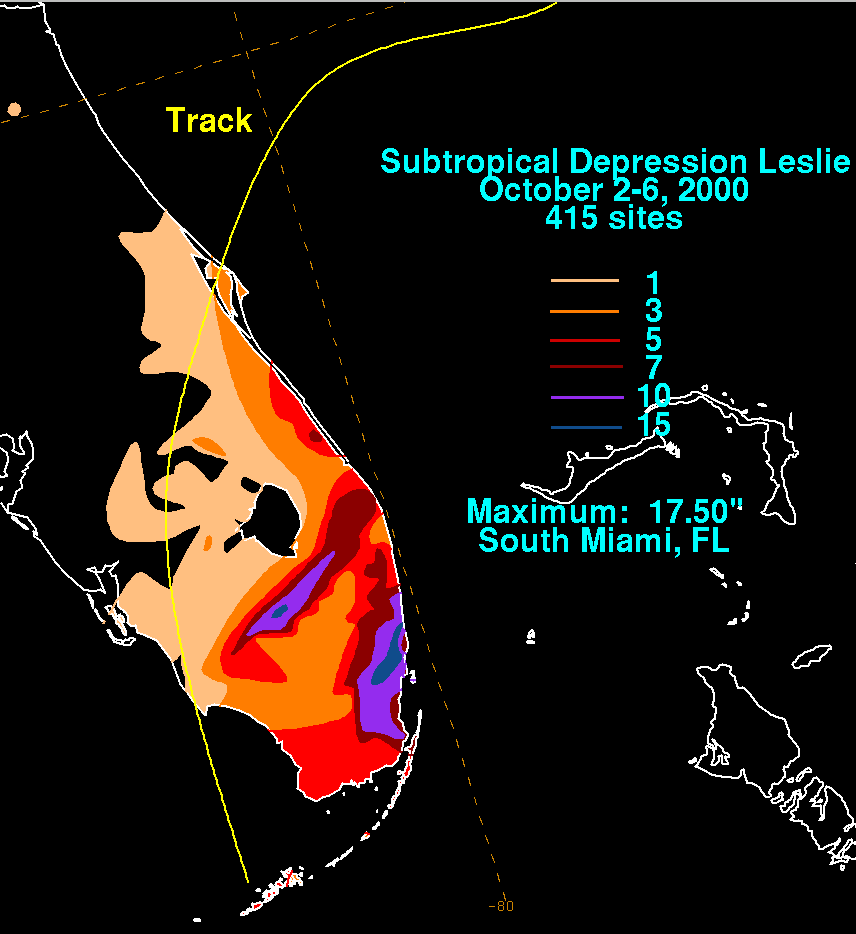
Rainfall totals from Leslie

The precursor disturbance of Leslie dropped heavy rainfall across central and western Cuba, peaking at 8.25 in (210 mm) in the province of Havana. Numerous other areas reported over four in (100 mm).

In southern Florida, rainfall began on October 2 and continued for four days, but most of the heavy rainfall occurred in a 24 hour period from October 3–4. The highest rainfall total was 17.50 in (444 mm), recorded in South Miami. Two areas received over 10 in (250 mm) of rain – one to the south of Lake Okeechobee and a 10 mi (16 km) wide swath from Miami into eastern Broward County. Miami recorded 12.56 in (319 mm) on October 3, setting an October record for daily precipitation. On the same day, Key West also broke its October daily rainfall record, recording 3.52 in (89 mm) of precipitation. The most significant flooding occurred in Sweetwater, West Miami, Hialeah, Opa-locka, and Pembroke Park. The heavy rainfall was the result of precursor to Leslie interacting with the stalled cold front to produce the intense rainbands. Since it was an unnamed weather system at the time, it was locally referred to as the "no-name storm of 2000". The Miami NWS compared the event to Hurricane Irene, which produced similar floods in the area a year earlier. In addition to the rainfall, the weather system generated four tornadoes across southern Florida, all on October 3. A tornado touched down and damaged a Hialeah fire station, causing damage to vehicles, signs, and trees. It was rated an F1 on the Fujita scale. The others were all rated F0, which were reported near Perrine, Redlands, and Kendall. Also during the period of heaviest rainfall, a thunderstorm produced wind gusts of 63 mph (102 km/h) in South Miami, strong enough to knock down tree limbs.

The flooding in South Florida proved damaging and deadly, with three fatalities related to the precursor to Tropical Storm Leslie. Two people drowned after driving into flooded canals, including a worker at Miami International Airport, while a third person died after falling from a roof while repairing a leak. The weather system also caused an estimated $950 million in damage. Floodwaters entered about 93,000 houses, affecting about 214,000 people, with some areas underwater for a week. According to a survey by the American Red Cross, the floods destroyed 1,005 houses, severely damaged 1,358, and caused minor damage to 3,443 others. The flood waters, which were four ft (1.2 m) deep in places, stranded many in their houses, forcing them to use canoes or inflatable rafts to move to higher grounds. All non-essential Miami-Dade County employees were asked to stay home. The flooding, which was greatest in Sweetwater, West Miami, Hialeah, Opa-locka, and Pembroke Park, lasted up to a week in areas. The extreme flooding damaged electrical stations, leaving more than 27,000 without power. The floods also damaged 15 schools across Miami-Dade County. Property damage across the region totaled $450 million. Flood waters in Miami-Dade County covered about 40,000 acres (160 km²) of farmland. The damage was worsened since the flooding occurred at the beginning of the planting period for the winter season. Flooded nurseries and fields resulted in about $500 million in agricultural damage, including $60 million in tropical fruit and $397 million in ornamental crops.

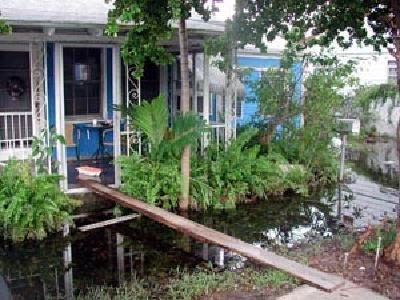
Flooded house in Miami-Dade County

Outside of the Miami area, the weather system had less significant but still damaging effects. A band of 8 to 10 in (200 to 250 mm) of rainfall in a six-hour period led to flash flooding from Lehigh Acres to Fort Myers Beach. The floodwaters damaged vehicles and homes. Farther northeast, the rains inundated roadways in parts of Indian River County.

As an extratropical storm, Leslie moved over southeastern Newfoundland. The storm produced winds of 40 miles per hour (65 km/h), along with 0.79 to 1.18 in (20 to 30 mm) of rainfall. The storm also produced wave heights of up to 16 ft (5 m). Storm impacts in the region were minor.

== Aftermath ==
Due to the floods in south Florida, President Bill Clinton declared a federal disaster area on October 4, which allocated the use of funds for disaster relief. Three counties – Broward, Collier, and Monroe – were eligible for individual assistance. Meanwhile, Broward and Miami-Dade Counties were eligible for public assistance, which provided for 75% of the debris removal cost and the repairing public facilities. FEMA director James Lee Witt toured the flooded areas on October 6, along with congressional representatives Lincoln Díaz-Balart and Carrie Meek, and Miami-Dade County Mayor Alex Penelas. The U.S. Department of Agriculture declared 16 Florida counties, including Miami-Dade, Collier, and Palm Beach, as primary disaster areas due to flooding, making farmers and their families there eligible for USDA emergency farm loans. The same agency made 22 other counties, including Broward, eligible for loans due to their proximity to the disaster areas. The Florida government also released $100,000 toward helping farmworkers.

In the eight days after the floods, the American Red Cross opened 26 locations to provide meals to families, serving more than 50,000 meals. In the immediate aftermath, cleanup workers could not work until the flood waters receded. In addition, abandoned cars blocked the path of utility workers. By ten days after the storm, government agencies distributed 105,000 meals, 141,000 US gal (530,000 L) of water, and 357,000 lb (162,000 kg) of ice. Thousands visited the five Disaster Recovery Centers, where information on disaster-related issues was given. By around two months after the flooding, over 51,000 people applied for federal aid, with assistance totaling to more than $170 million.

== See also ==
- Other tropical cyclones named Leslie
- List of Florida hurricanes (2000–present)
- Timeline of the 2000 Atlantic hurricane season
