= List of storms named Leslie =

The name Leslie, or the alternate spelling of the name, Lesley, has been used for six tropical cyclones worldwide: four in the Atlantic Ocean, one in the South Pacific Ocean, and one in the South-West Indian Ocean.

In the Atlantic:

- Tropical Storm Leslie (2000), weak tropical storm that impacted Bermuda, Florida, Cuba, and Newfoundland
- Hurricane Leslie (2012), long-lived Category 1 hurricane that caused minor damage in Bermuda and Newfoundland
- Hurricane Leslie (2018), long-lived and extremely erratic system that constantly fluctuated between tropical storm and Category 1 hurricane intensity, made landfall in the Iberian Peninsula as an extratropical cyclone
- Hurricane Leslie (2024), long-lived Category 2 hurricane that stayed in the open ocean

In the South Pacific:

- Cyclone Leslie (1979), relatively weak tropical cyclone that formed south of Tonga without causing any damage

In the South-West Indian:

- Tropical Storm Lesley (1965), traversed southward in the Mozambique channel
