= Hurricane Vince =

Category 1 Atlantic hurricane in 2005

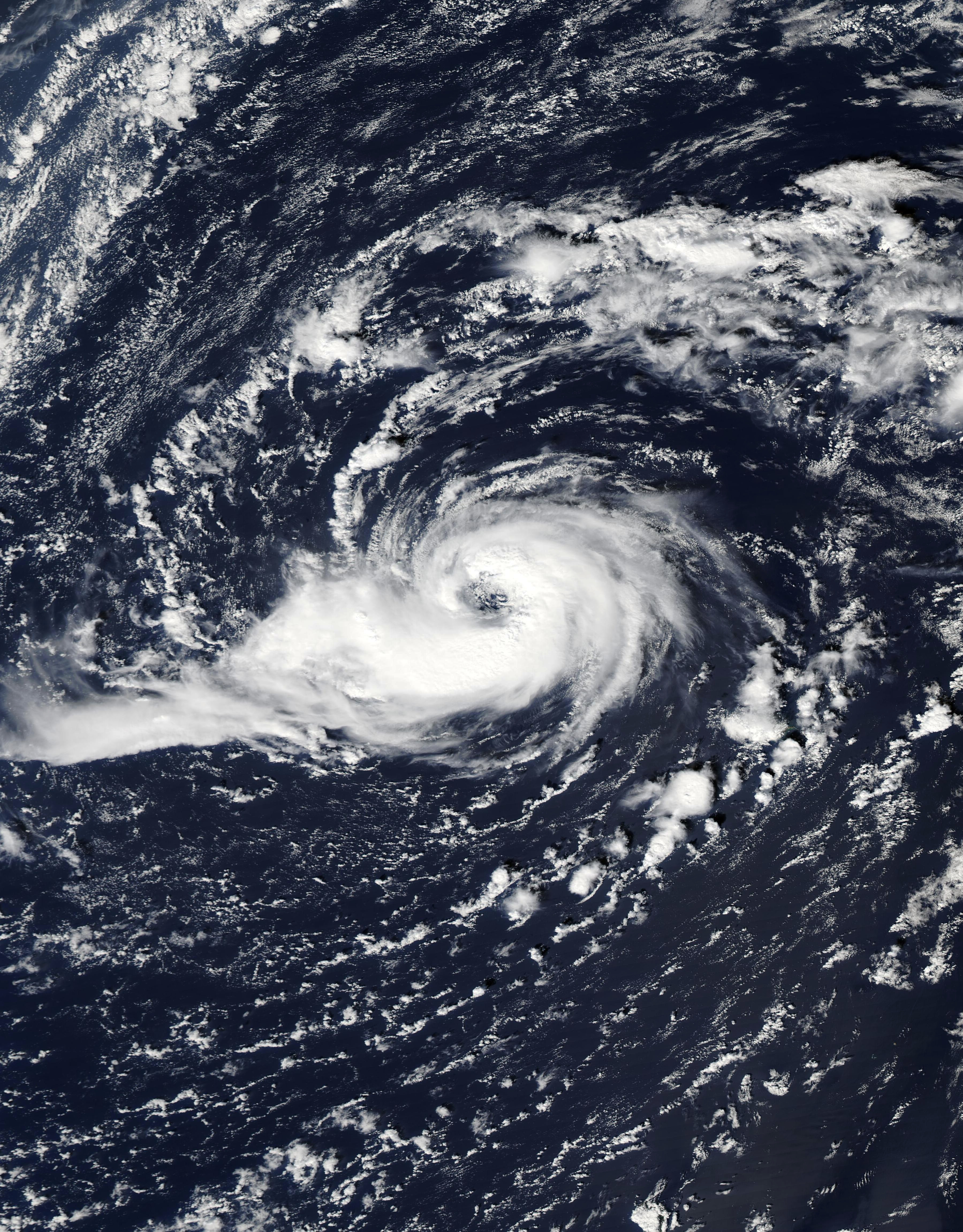
- Hurricane Vince on 9 October, northwest of the Madeira Island. For comparison, the island is approximately 55 km or 35 miles long.

Meteorological history
- Formed: October 8, 2005
- Dissipated: October 11, 2005

Category 1 hurricane
- 1-minute sustained (SSHWS/NWS)
- Highest winds: 75 mph (120 km/h)
- Lowest pressure: 988 mbar (hPa); 29.18 inHg

Overall effects
- Fatalities: None reported
- Damage: Minimal
- Areas affected: Madeira Islands, Iberian Peninsula
- IBTrACS
- Part of the 2005 Atlantic hurricane season

Hurricane Vince was an unusual tropical cyclone that developed in the northeastern Atlantic basin. Forming in October during the 2005 Atlantic hurricane season, it strengthened over waters thought to be too cold for tropical development. Vince was the twentieth named storm and twelfth hurricane of the extremely active season.

Vince developed from an extratropical system on 8 October, becoming a subtropical storm southeast of the Azores. The United States National Hurricane Center (NHC) did not officially name the storm until the next day, shortly before Vince became a hurricane. The storm weakened at sea and made an extremely rare landfall on the Iberian Peninsula as a tropical depression on 11 October. Vince was one of only three tropical or subtropical cyclones to do so, alongside the 1842 Spanish hurricane and Subtropical Storm Alpha of 2020. It dissipated over Spain, bringing much-needed rain to the region, and its remnants passed into the Mediterranean Sea.

== Meteorological history ==
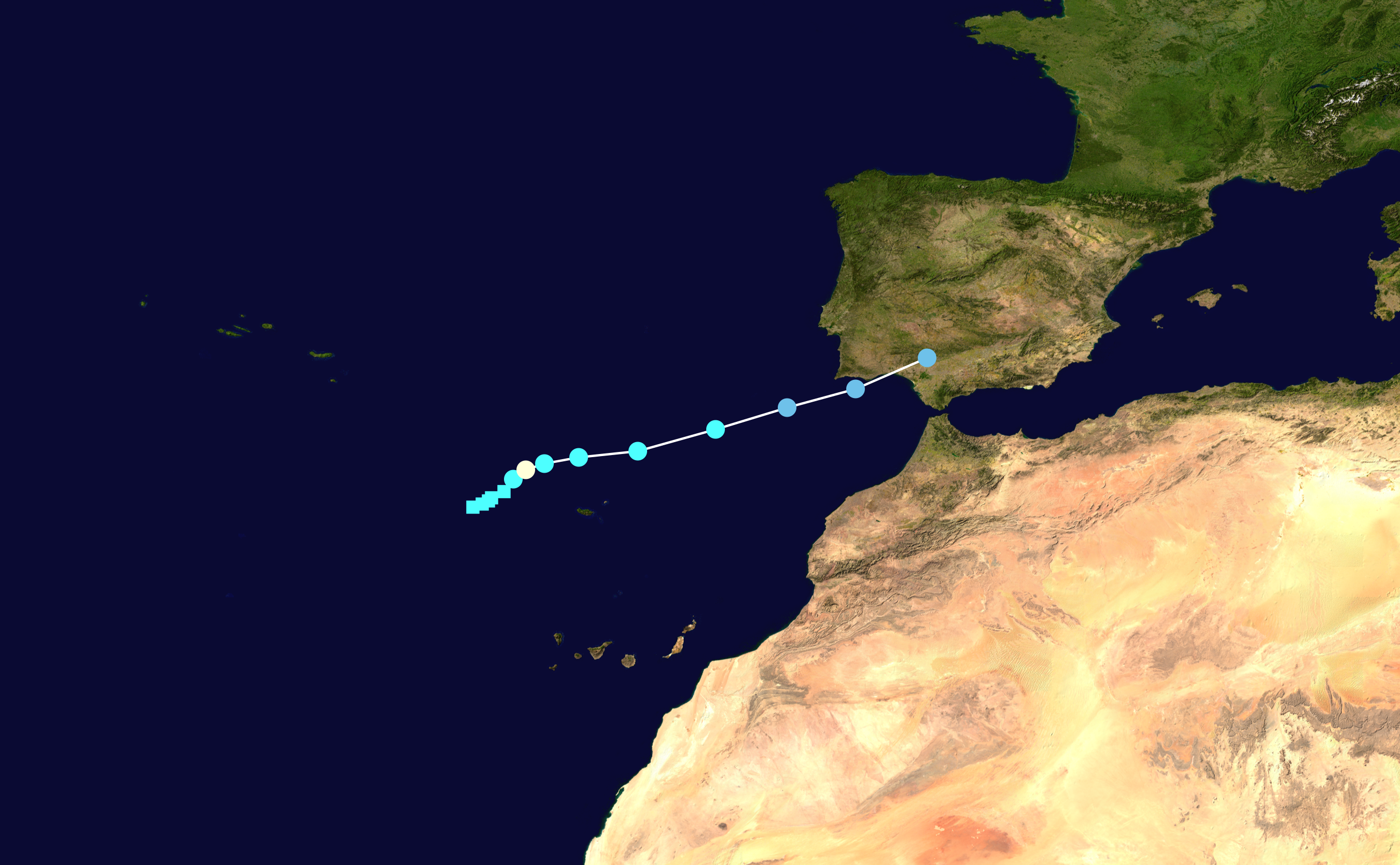
Map plotting the storm's track and intensity, according to the Saffir–Simpson scale Map key Saffir–Simpson scale Tropical depression (≤38 mph, ≤62 km/h) Tropical storm (39–73 mph, 63–118 km/h) Category 1 (74–95 mph, 119–153 km/h) Category 2 (96–110 mph, 154–177 km/h) Category 3 (111–129 mph, 178–208 km/h) Category 4 (130–156 mph, 209–251 km/h) Category 5 (≥157 mph, ≥252 km/h) Unknown Storm type Tropical cyclone Subtropical cyclone Extratropical cyclone, remnant low, tropical disturbance, or monsoon depression

On 5 October, an operationally unnamed subtropical storm which had gone unnoticed by the NHC was absorbed by a temperate frontal low, which was moving to the southeast over the Azores. The low pressure system gained a more concentrated circulation and lost its frontal structure after absorbing the subtropical storm. The developing system became a subtropical storm itself early on 8 October, 930 kilometres (580 mi) southeast of Lajes in the Azores. However, the NHC decided not to name the system Vince at the time, because the water temperature was too low for normal development for a tropical cyclone. The storm gradually gained the tropical characteristics of symmetry and a warm inner core and became a tropical storm the next day. Its transformation to a tropical system occurred over water cooler than 24 °C (75 °F), much colder than the 26.5 °C (79.7 °F) usually required for tropical development.

Soon after it became a tropical storm on 9 October near Madeira, with a ragged eye already present, the NHC officially named it Tropical Storm Vince and began to issue advisories. At the time there was some uncertainty as to whether Vince was tropical or subtropical but, in his post-season analysis, forecaster James L. Franklin of the NHC conceded that Vince had formed as a subtropical storm and had evolved into a tropical storm before it was named. The storm's ragged eye quickly solidified and contracted into a "bona fide" eye with a diameter of 25 km (16 mi). This increase in organization was accompanied by strengthening, and Vince reached its peak strength as a hurricane with 120 km/h (75 mph) winds later that day. The NHC forecasters decided that "if it looks like a hurricane, it probably is, despite its environment and unusual location".

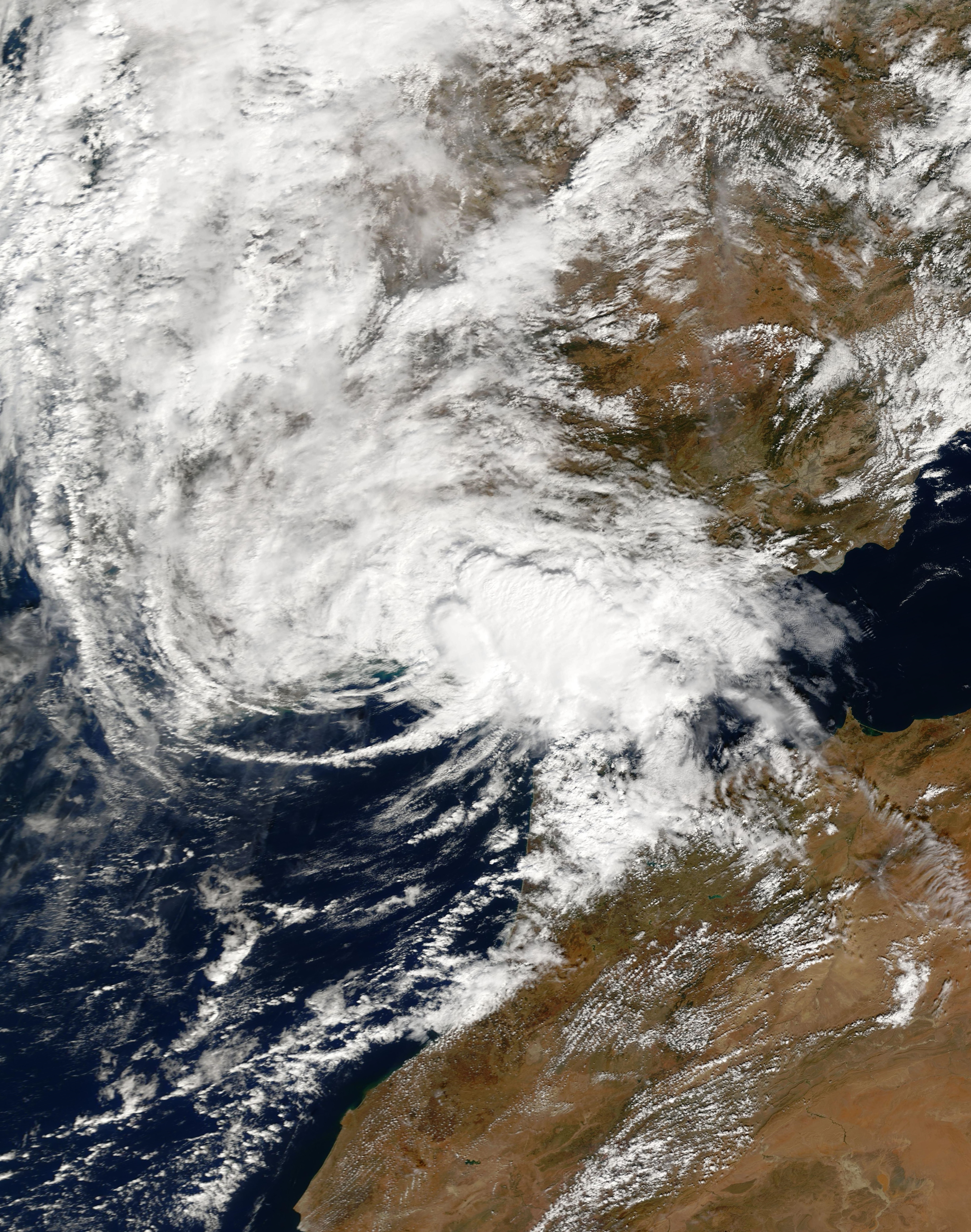
Tropical Depression Vince over the Iberian Peninsula on 11 October

Hurricane Vince's impressive organization was very short lived as westerly wind shear began to erode the eye within hours. In response, the storm weakened to a tropical storm shortly thereafter. A broad low-level trough approached the storm from the northwest, pulling the convection northward as the storm's low-level center accelerated eastward. On 10 October, two brief bursts of convection surprised forecasters, but with the sea surface temperature as low as 22 °C (72 °F), the flares were not sustained. Vince continued to weaken as it approached the Iberian Peninsula and became a tropical depression on 11 October, shortly before it made landfall near Huelva, Spain. The fast-moving tropical depression quickly dissipated over land. Its remnants moved across southern Spain, dumping rain on the drought-ridden region, and moved into the Mediterranean Sea south of Alicante in the early hours of 12 October.

== Preparations and impact ==
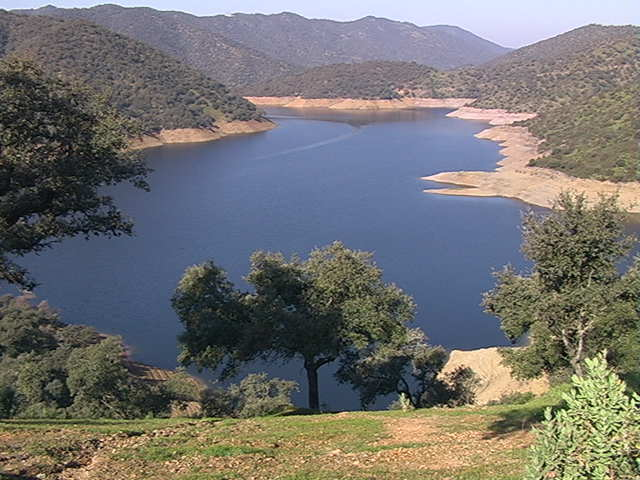
This reservoir in Córdoba, Spain was one of many that benefited from Hurricane Vince's unseasonable rainfall.

The Spanish Center for Emergency Coordination declared a rain pre-emergency for the province of Castellón in the anticipation that Hurricane Vince would bring rains capable of flooding. The Instituto Nacional de Meteorología (INM) issued a bulletin that warned of a 40% chance of flooding. Four Spanish autonomous communities (Asturias, Catalonia, Castile and León, and Galicia) issued flood warnings, and Canarias issued a wind warning. Spanish fishing fleets off the Andalusian coast returned to port and weathered the storm on their moorings rather than in the open ocean.

Spain's population, which had been battling fires after a record breaking summer drought, welcomed the rains brought by Vince's remnants. In two days the storm brought more rain to the province of A Coruña than had fallen all summer, easing the sinking water levels in provincial reservoirs, but also causing traffic jams and minor floods. In Córdoba province, the A-303, A-306 and CO-293 roads were partially flooded but "passable with caution". Municipal roadworks on La Ronda de Poniente, a major traffic artery connecting the city to nearby motorways, were flooded and partially destroyed. The entrance of the University of A Coruña was temporarily blocked by flood waters on 11 October, and a nearby roundabout was submerged. These damages were minor, and no fatalities were reported. The highest winds reported on land were 77 km/h (48 mph) at Jerez, Spain, although some ships recorded stronger. Vince was comparable to normal rain events from temperate systems, with only 25 to 50 mm (1 to 2 in) of rain falling. Through a play on words of a song in the musical My Fair Lady, National Hurricane Center forecaster James Franklin in the Tropical Cyclone Report for Vince wrote, "the rain in Spain was mainly less than 2 inches [50 mm], although 3.30 inches [85 mm] fell in the plain at Córdoba."

== Records and naming ==
Subtropical Storm Vince formed in an unusual location in the far-eastern Atlantic, and developed into a hurricane farther east than any other known storm at the time, at 18.9° W. This record was broken by Hurricane Pablo in 2019, at 18.3° W. The National Hurricane Center declared that Vince was the first tropical cyclone on record to have made landfall on the Iberian Peninsula. Historical documents, however, suggest that a possibly stronger tropical storm or hurricane struck the Iberian Peninsula on 29 October 1842.

When Vince formed on 8 October it marked the first time in recorded history that a 21st tropical or subtropical storm had ever developed within a single Atlantic hurricane season. The previous record of 20 storms was set by the 1933 season. Hurricane Vince was also the first named "V" storm in the Atlantic since naming began in 1950. It would be 15 years until another season would have a V-named storm – Tropical Storm Vicky in 2020 and also Tropical Storm Victor in 2021. Tropical Storm Wilfred beat Vince as the earliest 21st named storm in a season, forming 20 days earlier.

== See also ==
- Other storms of the same name
- Timeline of the 2005 Atlantic hurricane season
- Tropical cyclone effects in Europe
- 1842 Madeira hurricane, made landfall in Spain
- Hurricane Ophelia (2017), easternmost Atlantic Basin major hurricane on record
- Hurricane Leslie (2018), extratropical remnant made landfall in Portugal
- Subtropical Storm Alpha (2020), made landfall in Portugal
