= 1842 Atlantic hurricane season =

The 1842 Atlantic hurricane season featured several maritime catastrophes in the Gulf of Mexico and along the U.S. East Coast, and produced one of the only known tropical cyclones to directly affect the Iberian Peninsula. As the season falls outside the scope of the Atlantic hurricane database, records of most storms in 1842 are scarce, and only approximate tracks are known. The first documented storm of the season battered the coast of North Carolina in mid-July, wrecking dozens of ships and destroying homes along the Outer Banks. A little over a month later, another storm impacted the same region and caused several more shipwrecks that killed at least 12 men. This storm later doused the Mid-Atlantic states with flooding rains. In early September, a powerful storm known as "Antje's Hurricane"—named after a ship that it dismasted—tracked generally westward after first being spotted over the Leeward Islands. After yielding widespread destruction across the Bahamas, the storm traversed the Florida Straits, causing severe damage in both northern Cuba and the lower Florida Keys. Many ships and their crews were lost to the storm as it crossed the Gulf of Mexico; it finally struck northern Mexico on September 8.

Another intense hurricane churned the Gulf of Mexico in early October, this time tracking from southwest to northeast. The storm moved very slowly and sank or impaired numerous ships along its course. Striking northern Florida on October 5 as the equivalent of a major hurricane, the cyclone produced extreme wind gusts to the north of its center and exceptionally high tides to the south. Extensive property damage in Tallahassee accounted for an estimated $500,000 (1842 USD) in losses. On Cedar Key, the storm surge demolished buildings and threatened to submerge the island. The storm turned northward as it entered the western Atlantic, resulting in strong winds and flooding tides in Savannah, Georgia, and Charleston, South Carolina. Later in the month, an extremely rare hurricane formed in the far eastern Atlantic, to the southwest of Madeira. This storm passed near the islands on October 27 before making landfall in southwestern Spain. Accompanied by significant damage, both along the coast and inland, this storm is considered a historical analogue to Hurricane Vince of 2005. Several other storms also had an impact on land throughout the season.

== Background ==
Attempts to catalog Atlantic hurricanes in the first half of the 19th century began as early as 1855, when Andrés Poey compiled information on just over 400 tropical cyclones from 1493 to 1855. Poey's work serves as the basis for much of what is currently known about historical Atlantic tropical cyclones. He identified four distinct tropical systems that developed in 1842 (six events are listed, though two concern the same storm), plus another in November that was later deemed extratropical in nature. In his 1963 book, Early American Hurricanes, 1492–1870, weather researcher David M. Ludlum discussed, in greater detail, six significant tropical cyclones that impacted the United States in 1842. As the season falls outside the scope of the Atlantic hurricane database (1851 onward) and its associated reanalysis project, records are regarded as incomplete.

== Storms ==
=== July ===
The first documented hurricane of 1842 severely affected coastal North Carolina from Wilmington to Currituck on July 12. Its center likely remained just east of Cape Hatteras as it washed away houses, drowned livestock, and wreaked havoc on shipping interests. Nearly 30 ships ran aground near Ocracoke Inlet, and two unidentified vessels were wrecked on the shoals near Cape Hatteras with all hands lost; seven more men drowned while trying to salvage goods from the shipwrecks. In late October, a message in a bottle was recovered at Bermuda with an account of the storm from the captain and first mate of the imperiled schooner Lexington, presumed lost at sea. In total, around 40 ships were lost. Although sparse records preclude an accurate death toll, the National Hurricane Center lists the cyclone among those that may have caused 25 or more fatalities.

Described by one writer as "one of the worst in the history of coastal Carolina", the storm reportedly demolished all but one structure in the village of Portsmouth. Further inland, at Washington, damaging gale-force winds continued through July 13 and 14, and boats in the Albemarle Sound broke free of their moorings. Part of the Wilmington and Raleigh Railroad was washed out, preventing mail from reaching Charleston, South Carolina. After its close pass to North Carolina, the storm moved toward the northwest and made landfall near Norfolk, Virginia. Torrential rainfall affected the Mid-Atlantic states, with flooding reported along major rivers; the Schuylkill River in Philadelphia, for instance, rose 5 ft (1.5 m) over its banks.

=== August ===
Based on an August 2 diary entry describing heavy rainfall and gusty northeasterly winds at Fort George Island, a tropical storm is believed to have made landfall just south of there. In southeastern Georgia, the storm negatively affected the cotton crop that was already suffering from persistent drought conditions.

Another damaging tropical cyclone, "hardly less severe" and reportedly of a much longer duration than the July hurricane, struck the Outer Banks of North Carolina on August 24. The storm wrecked numerous vessels, among them being the Kilgore at Currituck, the Pioneer and the Granary at Ocracoke, and the Congress at Cape Hatteras. At least 12 men died in these shipwrecks. As the storm continued northward, severe weather conditions affected the Mid-Atlantic and Northeastern states on August 25. Extensive flooding in Washington, D.C. turned Pennsylvania Avenue into "a broad river" and inundated homes and cellars, with losses in the city estimated at $50,000 (1842 USD). Streets, wharves, shipyards, and lumberyards in Baltimore were submerged, while further north, hurricane-force winds and a flooding storm surge affected New York City.

=== September ===
"Antje's Hurricane" took its name from the ship HMS Antje, which was dismasted by the cyclone in the western Atlantic on August 30. This cyclone was first noted in the Leeward Islands in late August, and went on to ruin over 100,000 bushels of salt across the Turks and Caicos Islands. Overspreading the Bahamas on September 2 and 3, the storm caused "very great" damage and loss of life throughout the island chain. In particular, reports indicated that most of the homes were destroyed on Watlings Island in the eastern Bahamas. The storm passed through the Florida Straits on September 4. Barometric pressure fell to 28.93 inHg (980 mbar) at Havana, where strong winds persisted for 36 hours. The storm sank several boats and damaged many others in Havana Harbor, while on land, the winds blew down trees and small buildings.

The lower Florida Keys were battered; "half of Sand Key was blown away", including the lightkeeper's house, and extensive damage to buildings and vegetation was reported on Key West. However, the offshore wind apparently allowed Key West to escape with relatively light shipping losses. The storm subsequently followed a path due westward across the Gulf of Mexico. Along the hurricane's course, many vessels—such as the brig Chili, en route to Havana—were lost with their crews. By September 8, the cyclone had made landfall along the coast of Tamaulipas in Mexico, and the eye passed directly over Ciudad Victoria as evidenced by a brief, five-minute lull. Heavy rain swept across southern Texas as the cyclone dissipated over mountainous terrain.

On the night of September 17–18, a new tropical storm in the northwestern Gulf of Mexico affected Galveston, Texas. Northerly winds drove water from Galveston Bay over the island to a depth of up to 4 ft (1.2 m). The storm surge destroyed several structures and washed ashore small boats, while strong winds heavily damaged two churches. Many families were forced to evacuate their homes in the middle of the night by wading through floodwaters to reach higher ground. Estimates of total monetary damage ranged from $10,000 to as high as $50,000. Though no people lost their lives, 40 cattle were killed in a building collapse.

Several days later, the Florida Panhandle experienced the effects of a tropical storm, marked by gale-force winds at Pensacola on September 22 and 23. No appreciable damage was reported. Ludlum considered that this may have been a continuation of the Galveston storm, but judged it to be a separate system.

=== Early October ===
The most destructive storm of the season can be traced back to near Saint Thomas at the end of September. By the beginning of October, it had tracked into the extreme southern Bay of Campeche. For several days, the strengthening storm battered ships as it turned northeastward through the Gulf of Mexico, with numerous vessels lost and many more damaged. The steamship Merchant began taking on water on October 3, and the next day she broke up after running aground several hundred yards offshore. All but 8 of the 72 passengers were rescued on October 5. The brig Cuba and about 14 passengers were lost off Key West. During this period, many birds died over open waters after becoming trapped in the circulation of the slow-moving hurricane. The system delivered a glancing blow to Galveston, where the storm surge flooded streets and a few buildings were blown down.

The storm buffeted Florida for an extended period from October 4 through 6, and moved ashore just north of Key as the equivalent of a major hurricane on the modern-day Saffir–Simpson scale. The minimum central pressure at the time of landfall has been estimated at 955 mb (28.2 inHg). "Extreme" winds in the northern side of the hurricane proved devastating along the Florida Panhandle. In Apalachicola, a lighthouse and keeper's house were destroyed, and a multitude of homes were unroofed. Several people in the area drowned in storm surge flooding. In Tallahassee, the storm wrought $500,000 in losses in the form of widespread structural damage. Thousands of trees were blown down throughout the region, and a significant portion of the cotton crop was lost. Two slaves on a plantation near Tallahassee were injured, one of them severely. To the south of the storm center, Cedar Key faced exceptionally high tides that swept entire homes away and threatened to submerge the island. Several ships were wrecked along the coast of Florida.

The hurricane continued northeastward across northern Florida before emerging into the Atlantic between Mayport and St. Augustine. At the latter city, the storm was regarded as the most severe in 15 years; fences, trees, and crops were destroyed, and a few ships were driven aground, though the sea wall largely protected St. Augustine. Winds at Savannah, Georgia, increased to hurricane strength on the night of October 5–6 and were accompanied by torrential rains. The storm surge there flooded wharves and other low-lying areas. The slow-moving storm buffeted the southern Georgia Sea Islands with a prolonged period of strong winds and heavy rain, blowing down trees and destroying some houses. Rice plantations along the Altamaha River experienced significant losses. "Unprecedented" tides also flooded streets farther up the coast in Charleston, South Carolina, such that some residents had to be rescued from their homes by boat. Though damage there was generally minor, five slaves drowned when their fishing boat capsized in rough seas. As the hurricane moved away from the coast, several ships were lost off North Carolina. On October 8 and 9, Bermuda experienced strong winds as the storm passed nearby.

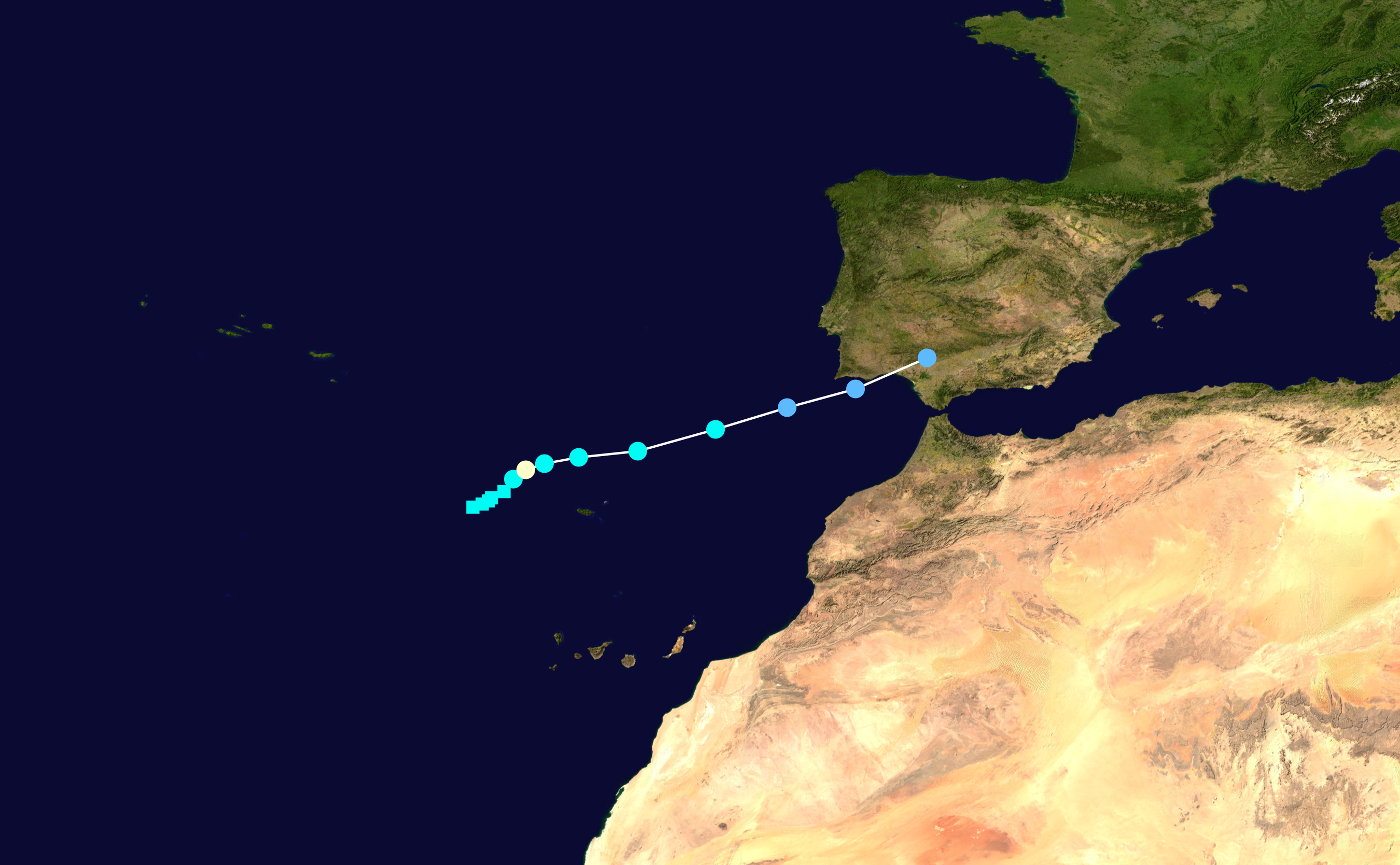
Track map of 2005's Hurricane Vince, which likely followed a path very similar to that of the late-October hurricane in the eastern Atlantic

=== Late October ===
In late October, a highly unusual tropical cyclone formed in the far eastern Atlantic, first detected to the southwest of Madeira on October 24. On October 26, a ship near Madeira recorded a barometric pressure of 965 mb (28.5 inHg), suggesting a hurricane of Category 2 intensity. The hurricane passed just north of Madeira on October 27, producing heavy damage in Funchal. After brushing the northwestern coast of Morocco on the night of October 28–29, the hurricane moved ashore over southwestern Spain and likely became extratropical shortly thereafter. As a result of the extratropical transition, damaging winds extended far from the storm center and affected much of inland Spain. Dozens of ships, including three belonging to the Spanish Navy, were lost or severely damaged in the storm. Two bridges were washed away in Cádiz and homes were destroyed in Seville. Hurricane-force winds reached as far inland as Madrid, and thousands of trees were uprooted in the province of Badajoz. This storm serves as an important historical analogue for Hurricane Vince, which followed a similar course in October 2005.

Around the same time, a separate tropical cyclone formed in the western Atlantic. It moved from off the coast of Florida to near Bermuda between October 24 and November 1, brushing the coast from St. Augustine to Charleston with gale-force winds. No significant damage occurred, though coastal flooding and heavy rainfall that caused a break in an earthen dam were reported along the coast of Georgia.

== See also ==
- Lists of hurricanes by area:
  - Bermuda
  - Europe
  - Florida
  - North Carolina
  - Texas
- 1840s Atlantic hurricane seasons
