= Effects of Storm Kristin in Portugal =

Storm Kristin
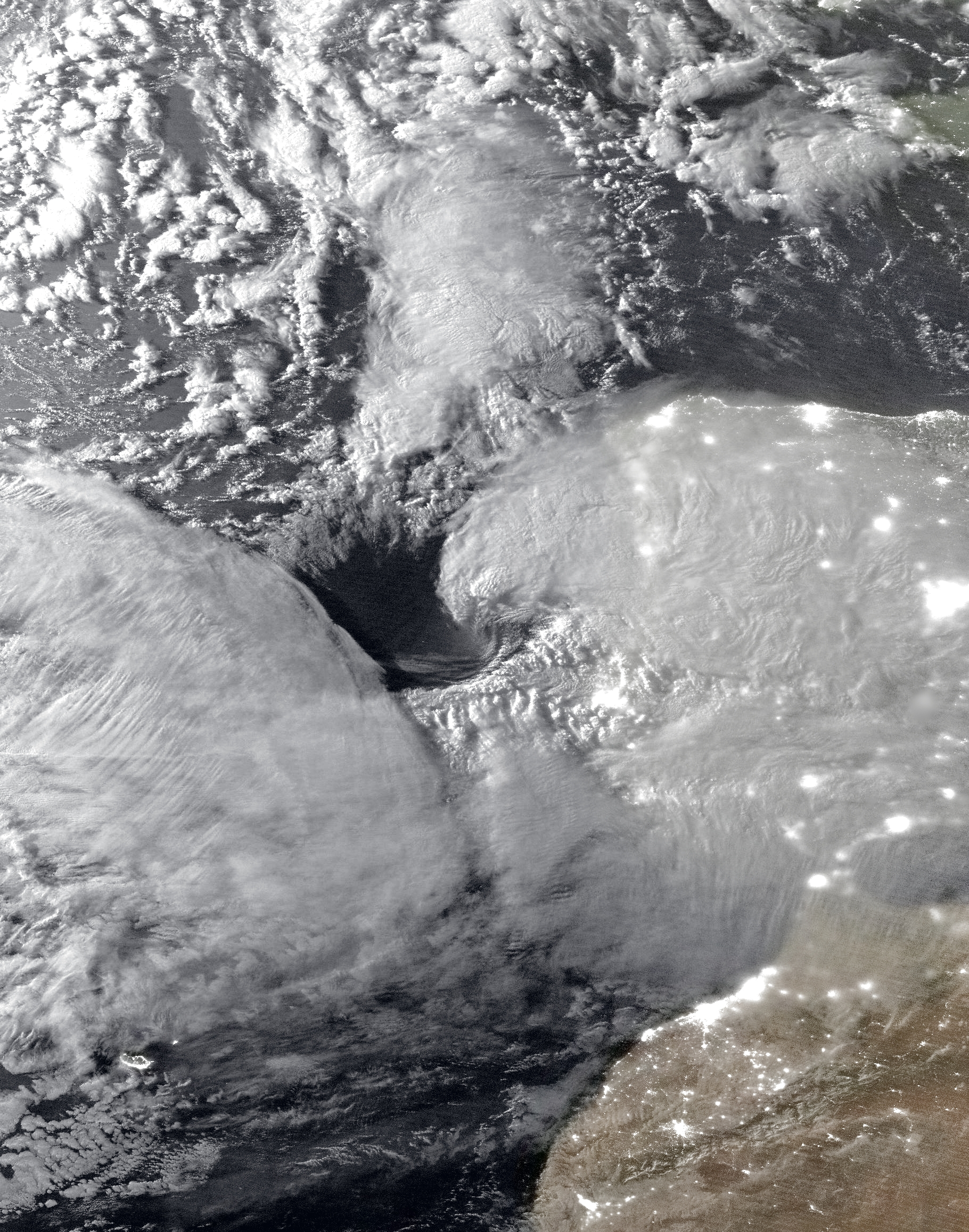
- Satellite imagery of Kristin, a few hours before landfall in Leiria.

Meteorological history
- Duration: 28 January 2026

Extratropical cyclone
- Highest gusts: 209 km/h (130 mph) in Soure, Portugal. 238 km/h (148 mph) at an amateur station in Lavos, Portugal.
- Lowest pressure: 975 hPa (mbar); 28.79 inHg

Overall effects
- Fatalities: 14
- Injuries: 2,177 (172 direct, 2,000 indirect)
- Damage: €6 billion (2026) (Costliest in Portuguese history)
- Areas affected: Portugal, especially the Leiria district.
- Part of the 2025-26 European windstorm season

Portugal was severely affected by Storm Kristin on 28 January. The Portuguese districts of Leiria, Coimbra, and Santarém were especially devastated, as Kristin caused wind gusts in excess of 200 km/h, floodings, and landslides.

In the central region of Portugal, Kristin caused estimated monetary losses of €6 billion, which is more than 1.6% of the country's GDP. In the Leiria district, Kristin caused up to €5 billion in losses, which is approximately 65% of Leiria's regional GDP. Hundreds of thousands of homes were damaged and thousands of homes were destroyed. Kristin caused long-term and widespread communication outages in the central region of Portugal, lasting for several months in approximately 20,000 cases. Portugal experienced its largest blackout in history, as approximately a million households and businesses lost power. Kristin caused a severe and large-scale ecological impact, as tens of millions of trees fell. Furthermore, Kristin was recognized as the biggest natural disaster in the country's contemporary history.

== Impact ==
Directly after Kristin, around 300,000 people in Portugal lost access to communications. More than three months after Kristin, 20,000 customers remained without access to telecommunications. Right after Kristin, approximately 1 million customers lost power. In the Leiria district, around 300,000 people—approximately 64% of the population—lost access to electricity. According to the REN, 61 very high voltage poles and 774 kilometres of REN's very high voltage lines were taken down, which were designed for maximum winds of 150 km/h. Kristin caused damage to cultural heritage in nearly 20 municipalities, such as the complete destruction of the Charolinha da Mata dos Sete Montes in Tomar and the loss of archaeological complexes at Forto Novo in Loulé. According to the Confederation of Farmers of Portugal, the agricultural and forestry sections suffered losses of €775 million. 90 km of coastline got affected by Kristin. 185 church buildings in Portugal suffered significant damage. There was a very significant devastation to Portuguese pig farming, especially in the Leiria region. Multiple transmission towers were destroyed, which affected the ability of multiple radio stations to broadcast. Pine forests and woodlands were destroyed in the Leiria and Coimbra districts.

There are estimated losses of €30 million in the poultry sector, as Kristin led to an expected drop of 5% in egg production. More than 250 libraries have suffered damage. Over 5,900 companies reported estimated losses of approximately €1.3 billion in total. EDP, which is part of E-Redes, estimates losses of approximately €80 million, which includes damage to electricity grids and generation assets, as well as associated operational costs. Over six thousand kilometres of network were affected by Kristin. In the coastal strip between Leiria and Figueira da Foz, more than two million cubic metres of pine wood needs to be removed. Hundreds of thousands of hectares of forests were affected by Kristin.

205,000 homes were damaged in Portugal by Kristin. Insurance companies in Portugal received over 140,000 claims after Kristin. Out of those claims, more than 60,000 claims were filed in the Leiria district. More than 500 people in Portugal were displaced after Kristin. The Impact Center for Climate Change estimates that 60% of companies registered in Marinha Grande, Leiria, Ourém, Ferreira do Zêzere, and Pombal suffered damage. The Médio Tejo region suffered €185 million in damage. Around 22,000 requests were filed to rebuild homes in Portugal after Kristin. Kristin destroyed 20% of the national resin production in Portugal. Beira Baixa reported a loss of €86 million. Coastal erosion up to 20 metres, destroyed access roads and walls, and unstable cliffs were reported at the coastline of Portugal. 40% of the eucalyptus forest has been destroyed by Kristin. The estimated insured losses are €1.2 billion. Kristin caused damage to around 300 pig farms in Portugal. Some military structures were damaged by Kristin. Kristin reduced the amount of beaches in Portugal. Thousands of telecommunication poles were destroyed in the central region of Portugal. Kristin caused over 700 road closures in Portugal.

=== Leiria District ===
Kristin caused estimated losses of €5 billion in the Leiria district, which is around 65% of its regional GDP. It was estimated that 170 of the 180 companies in the Meirinhas parish lost their roof, as a result of storm Kristin. 95% of all houses were damaged in the Meirinhas parish, where losses exceed €500 million. The Leiria Hospital got overwhelmed by the amount of polytrauma patients in the first days after Kristin. There were 84 people displaced in the municipality of Leiria. 177 people in the Leiria district were directly injured by Kristin. Furthermore, Gonçalo Lopes, the mayor of Leiria, described Leiria as a "warzone," describing it will take more than a year to recover. According to him, churches lost roofs, sport halls lost roofs, many houses lost tiles, and houses and cars were completely destroyed. The prime minister of Portugal, Luís Montenegro, admitted it will take many years before the Pombal area, which is an area in the heavily affected Leiria district, will be fully recovered. Nearly all homes in the municipality of Pombal suffered damage and the losses in Portugal are significantly higher than in the 2024 Portugal wildfires and the 2025 Portugal wildfires. A large part of the Leiria National Forest got devastated by Kristin. According to construction companies in Leiria, there is no capacity for recovery, and it will most likely take more than a year for things to go back to the way they were before. Also, factories and houses are completely destroyed according to them. In Leiria, schools were closed for at least a week, as a result of Kristin. In the vicinity of Soure, almost all electricity poles were knocked down by Kristin, alongside with several trees. Soure also experienced multiple floods, due to Kristin. Kristin resulted in the 'worst infrastructure destruction ever,' according to information obtained by Expresso. Thousands of kilometres of power lines were affected by Kristin.

Around 90% of businesses in Marinha Grande reported damage after Kristin. Almost all trees at the Castle of Leiria were destroyed by Kristin, alongside with eighteen metres of wall that collapsed. Right after Kristin, several families were isolated in Marinha Grande. The municipality of Marinha Grande reported ten minor injuries and rehoused 75 people. The Aliança Christian Community Church in Leiria lost its roof. Kristin scattered asbestos roof tiles across the public roads. The municipality of Figueiró dos Vinhos has 850 houses that suffered roof damage, as a result of Kristin. More than a thousand homes were damaged as a whole in the municipality and there were 30 hectares in the municipal forest of Figueiró dos Vinhos where not a single tree was left standing. The cemetery of Figueiró dos Vinhos was damaged. The bus terminal of Leiria collapsed, which resulted in around 45 vehicles being damaged. The Pedrógão Grande Volunteer Fire Department headquarters, which experienced severe structural damage and has been inoperable after Kristin, has suffered losses of around €720,000. Several classrooms in a school in the Colmeais parish were flooded. A kindergarten disappeared in Coucinheira and hundreds of houses lost their roofs in the municipality of Leiria. 25 people were displaced in Alvaiázere and 95% of all businesses and homes were affected there. Furthermore, the local health center in Alvaiázere had to close due to structural damage.

In Ansião, an agricultural supply store was completely destroyed. Several houses were damaged in Monte Real. In the Leiria region, two companies of the TJ Moldes group got destroyed, which left Porsche in Germany without parts. The Leiria City Council spent €12 million on cleaning and recovery work by 11 February, two weeks after Kristin. In Leiria and Torres Vedras, greenhouses and crops were destroyed. The La Redoute building in Leiria got severely damaged by Kristin. Many jobs in Pombal are at risk due to the impact of Kristin. Almost all shop windows were destroyed in Leiria. In the Barosa industrial zone, many companies were partially or totally destroyed. At the entrance of Marinha Grande, a group of modular houses were blown away. The Sporting Clube Marinhense lost its pavilion. In the Boavista area, the Municipal Exhibition Pavilion, which also served as a market, is completely destroyed. Along the waterfront of Praia da Vieira, all restaurants have broken windows and there is damage to swimming pools and hotels. A café in Vieira de Leiria got their windows shattered. The Diocese of Leiria-Fátima recorded damage to approximately 45% of its religious heritage. Churches, chapels, and parish centers suffered structural and artistic damage. At least 150 schools got damaged in Leiria by Kristin. The São Tiago da Guarda Parish Social Center suffered significant damage. The studio of an artist suffered extensive damage in Leiria.

The Ti Augusta restaurant in Pousos experienced severe damage. Kristin caused at least €35 million in damage to municipal equipment in Pombal, alongside with at least €80 million in damage to businesses and the displacement of 90 people. Kristin caused €15 million in damage to municipal infrastructure in Nazaré and almost €15 million in damage to public and private property in Porto de Mós. 80% of homes were affected by Kristin in Pedrógão Grande. More than 90 of the 125 clubs in the Leiria Football Association suffered significant damage due to Kristin. Kristin caused €106 million in damage to municipal equipment in Marinha Grande. The total amount of damage in Marinha Grande exceeds €143 million.

At the Hotel Cristal Vieira Praia, approximately €1 million in damage was caused by Kristin. Estimated monetary losses in the municipality of Leiria exceed €792.8 million, which doesn't include costs related to municipal and state infrastructure and forestry. The total amount of damage in the municipality of Leiria exceeds €1 billion. Up to eight million trees fell in the municipality of Leiria. 27% of all trees in the municipality of Leiria fell. A beach bar in Marinha Grande has been severely damaged. Schools in the municipalities of Leiria and Marinha Grande were destroyed by Kristin. All schools in the Leiria district were damaged. One month and a half after Kristin, some of those schools remain closed. The entire forest cover of Marinha Grande is on the ground, as a result of Kristin. Porto de Mós suffered an estimated damage of €8 million. Around 100 animals have been reported missing in the Leiria district after Kristin. The Praia da Vieira kindergarten got severely damaged. The municipality of Alvaiázere has estimated losses of more than €60 million. Several beehives were destroyed by Kristin in the Coimbrão parish.

Municipal losses exceed €15.6 million in the municipality of Batalha. A café in Pedrogão Grande was destroyed, alongside with several roofs of houses. Approximately 90% of the homes in the Arrabal parish were affected by water infiltration. A wooden house was swept away in Arrabal. The Mira de Aire cemetery got damaged by Kristin. 55,000 m² of greenhouses and net shelters were destroyed at a floriculture company in the parish of Ortigosa. There is a preliminary estimate of up to €9 million in damage to the road network in Pombal. The Leiria Polytechnic Institute suffered €6 million in damage, as extensive and widespread damage was reported. The municipality of Pedrógão Grande reported damage to more than 800 houses and €12 million in damage to municipal property in a provisional assessment. By 24 February, Pedrógão Grande still did not have internet. A gas leak was reported at a school in Calhas da Reinha.

Around a half of the 51,000 homes in the municipality of Leiria suffered damage. Many houses lost their roofs in Praia de Vieira. Several industries in the Vieira de Leiria Industrial Zone were affected severely by Kristin. In Praia de Vieira, a very heavy wooden beam flew more than 500 metres and crashed into a building. More than 50% of the pine trees in the Leiria district got lost due to Kristin. In Praia de Vieira, a very heavy wooden beam flew more than 500 metres and crashed into a building. More than 50% of the pine trees in the Leiria district got lost due to Kristin. The wind blew away the roof and windows of the Penedo da Saudade Lighthouse in São Pedro de Moel. A campsite in São Pedro de Moel got destroyed by Kristin, which led to a damage that exceeds €3 million. At the São Pedro de Moel campsite, bungalows were completely destroyed and caravans were blown into the air and flew over 50 metres. The Marrazes forest was heavily affected by Kristin. Over 800 businesses and more than 2,200 homes were destroyed in the Leiria district. The Regional Association of Construction and Public Works Industries of Leiria and Ourém estimates that full recovery will take between one and a half and two years.

The municipalities of Leiria, Marinha Grande, and Pombal account for approximately a third of the damage caused by Kristin, according to the coordinator of the Mission Structure for the Reconstruction of the Central Region. Over 4,500 traffic signs were damaged in the municipality of Leiria, alongside with dozens of locations with affected traffic lights. Kristin caused destruction of homes and businesses at Praia do Pedrógão. The Praia do Pedrógão campsite was devastated and caravans were carried away by Kristin. A café in the Pataias parish was wiped away, with only the floor remaining, as the entire coastline of the parish was affected by Kristin. The president of the Union of Parishes of Pataias and Martingança described widespread devastation. According to him, significant sand erosion, partial destruction of paths, and deep damage to walkways and support structions occurred. The Paredes da Vitória campsite was devastated by Kristin, with many caravans being overturned and one injury. Kristin caused a significant damage to Praia das Rocas. The Praia da Vieira campsite was damaged severely. Around 50 traffic lights were inoperative in Marinha Grande after Kristin. A flower company in Pombal suffered €1 million in damage. Many meeting places and picnic areas in the Leiria district were destroyed.

222 public buildings in the municipality of Pombal suffered extensive damage. Around 80 to 90% of all roofs of houses in the Vermoil parish were damaged by Kristin. Most homes were damaged and some were destroyed in the Bajouca parish. The Sanctuary of Miracles lost its roof. Several roofs in Milagres were damaged by Kristin. Six people were displaced in the municipality of Batalha. According to André Sousa, the mayor of the municipality of Batalha, hundreds of thousands of trees fell in Batalha. 30 people in the municipality of Alcobaça were displaced. The forest area of Albobaça was completely destroyed by Kristin. The Lis Valley experienced floods. All buildings in the business park of Marinha Grande were damaged with several roofs blown off and walls destroyed.

The roof of a cattery in Marinha Grande collapsed. Approximately 100,000 cubic meters of timber fell in the Leiria National Forest. All trees at Estrada do Tremelgo were damaged by Kristin. Around 71,500 customers in the municipality of Leiria were without water for between one and 18 days after Kristin. A café in the city of Leiria was severely damaged. 80% of the large trees in the Leiria city fell. The Guilherme Stephens primary school was severely damaged by Kristin. Approximately 60% of the roofs in the Bajouca parish were damaged by Kristin. Kristin revealed large amounts of debris and trash at the coast of Nazaré. 289 kilometres of forest roads were affected in Marinha Grande. Most roofs in the Leiria city were damaged. The roof of the Tryp Leiria hotel was damaged by Kristin. Kristin caused €400 thousand in damage to the Belo Horizonte swimming pool in Leiria. The municipality of Batalha estimates more than €3.4 million in damage to cultural heritage. 14 million trees fell in the municipality of Pombal. The Muralhas restaurant in Leiria suffered extensive damage, which resulted in a revenue drop of 70%. All companies in the business park in Ansião were damaged, half of them seriously.

=== Santarém District ===
Between 4,000 and 4,500 homes–around 80% or 85% of the municipality's homes–are estimated to be damaged in Ferreira do Zêzere, according to the mayor there. The mayor of Ferreira do Zêzere also estimates that full recovery will take a year and that 70% of the forest cover has fallen. Also, a majority of the buildings there got damaged according to the municipal coordinator of Civil Protection. A former president of the Ferreira do Zêzere council said "It was terrible. But the tornado lasted five minutes. It passed, destroyed everything, and that was it. This was an hour and a half." Ferreira do Zêzere experienced major power and communication outages, due to Kristin. More than 500 medium and large trees were felled at the Sanctuary of Fátima. 40 medium-voltage units and more than 200 low-voltage units were downed in the municipality of Tomar. The Santarém Tennis and Padel Club (CTPS) was destroyed by Kristin. According to Bruno Gomes, the mayor of Ferreira do Zêzere, estimated losses will exceed €200 million in the municipality.

Around 10,000 houses have had their roofs blown off in the municipality of Ourém. Around 300 people were displaced and 17 houses were completely destroyed in Ourém. Right after Kristin, the municipality of Ourém experienced a total interruption of the electricity, water, and mobile telecommunications supply. 97 to 98% of the homes were affected by Kristin in the Caxarias parish. According to Luís Albuquerque, the mayor of Ourém, it will take months or years for the municipality to return to normal. 10 houses were severely damaged by a landslide in the parish of Alcobertas. A beauty salon in the Caraxias parish has been destroyed. Kristin caused significant damage to the Caxarias Training Center.

An olive oil and wine company suffered extensive damage in Ferreira do Zêzere. Right after Kristin, 800 of the 1000 kilometres of roads were obstructed in the municipality of Ourém. A shelter for widows and orphans of the war in Ukraine collapsed in Ourém. The Sete Montes National Forest in Tomar got devastated and recovery of the forest could take decades. Losses in Abrantes exceed €10 million according to the Abrantes City Council, which was updated to €15 million as of 3 March. Kristin caused landslides and damage to many homes and roads in the municipality of Abrantes. Kristin caused €17 million in damage to the municipality of Tomar. People in the Rio Maior Health Center, which is located in the Lezíria do Tejo region, were evacuated due to a gas leak. Between 2,500 and 3,000 poles have fallen or broken in Ferreira do Zêzere.

The estimated losses in the municipality of Sardoal will exceed €10 million. Kristin caused €42 million in damage to the public infrastructure and €85 million in damage to homes in Ourém. 17 people were displaced in the municipality of Rio Maior. A family farm in Ferreira do Zêzere was destroyed by Kristin. Kristin caused approximately €60 million in losses to companies in the Santarém district. The roof of the Temporary Shelter Center in Ferreira do Zêzere collapsed, which caused 12 children to be displaced. The day centre in Além da Ribeira was severely damaged. Over 250 homes were damaged in the Além da Ribeira parish and multiple families were displaced. Kristin caused more than €3 million in damage in the Além da Ribeira parish.

The Fátima Municipal Stadium suffered extensive damage. The municipal dog pound in Ourém was completely destroyed. The roof of the Ourém castle collapsed partially and was also severely damaged. All 34 schools in the municipality of Ourém suffered damage. Thousands of trees have fallen throughout the municipality of Ourém and more than a half of the street furniture was damaged. A church in the Urqueira parish lost its roof. Many homes in the parish of Espite were damaged. Many trees in the parish of Casal dos Bernandes fell. The cemetery of Casal dos Bernandes was significantly damaged by Kristin, with numerous graves affected. The roof of the Church of Santo António was severely damaged. The metal roof of a bus stop in Casal dos Bernandes was blown off and crashed into the wall of a house. An old cooperative winery in Casal dos Frades was destroyed. Kristin significantly reduced the amount of shaded areas in the municipality of Ourém, as many trees were damaged. Kristin caused severe damage to the Caxarias Culture and Sports Center. Dozens of businesses in Ourém were devastated.

=== Coimbra District ===
Kristin shattered several windows in the Figueira da Foz District Hospital, which resulted in a temporary closure of offices and the operating theatre in the hospital. The University of Coimbra reported damage to roofs, window frames, windows, and other glass structures. The municipality of Miranda do Corvo was severely affected by Kristin, with estimated losses of €2,5 million. In Miranda do Corvo, between 400 and 500 houses suffered minor or moderate damage and between 10 and 20 houses suffered severe damage. A warehouse in Vila Nova de Anços was destroyed by Kristin. A ferris wheel, which was able to withstand sustained wind speeds of 160 km/h, collapsed and multiple caravans were overturned in an amusement park in Figueira da Foz. Estimated losses in the business sector of Figueira da Foz were several tens of millions of euros. Kristin caused a significant amount of damage to public infrastructure and the agricultural sector in Oliveira da Hospital. The roof of the former facilities of the International University of Figueira collapsed in Figueira da Foz. The municipality of Soure reported losses of €25 million. 20 people were displaced in Figueira da Foz and had to be relocated. Kristin caused an estimated €3.5 million in damage to municipal assets in Figueira da Foz. The primary school in Costa de Lavos was no longer usable as extensive damage was reported. The municipality of Arganil reported an estimated damage of €1 million.

The Figueira da Foz PSP police division suffered serious damage with broken windows, fallen tiles, and damaged police vehicles at the facilities of that division. The Bissaya Barreto municipal airfield in Coimbra collapsed. The aircraft, which were in the hangar, were damaged, some unrecoverable. 800 solar panels were destroyed at a resin company in Figueira da Foz. Of the 1,090 kilometres of forest roads in the municipality of Góis, approximately 717 kilometres were affected by Kristin.

=== Castelo Branco District ===
A local company in Vila de Rei was entirely destroyed, with estimated losses exceeding half a million euros. Kristin caused more than €30 million in damage in the municipality of Sertã. Kristin caused more than €6 million in damage in the municipality of Vila de Rei. Approximately 1,700 trees were destroyed in the municipality of Castelo Branco. More than 70% of the buildings in the municipality of Vila de Rei experienced roof damage and some businesses in the municipality experienced significant losses. The municipality of Proença-a-Nova registered more than one thousand instances of damage. Kristin affected 1,959 hectares in forest stand in Sertã.

=== Lisbon District ===
The Union of Parishes of Miragaia and Marteleira experienced significant damage, such as fallen trees, a collapsed wall, and land slides. Approximately 400 hectares of vineyards were affected by Kristin in the municipality of Alenquer. Kristin and its successors caused approximately €270 million in damage in Lisbon. Lourinhã suffered €25 million in damage. Kristin caused €37 million in damage in the municipality of Torres Vedras and 150 homes have suffered severe damage in the municipality. A wall in Belas collapsed.

=== Setúbal District ===
The municipality of Setúbal reported estimated losses of around €50 million after Kristin. The Moita Secondary School was severely damaged.

=== Aveiro District ===
Kristin caused over €5 million in damage in the municipality of Anadia.

== Reaction ==
Directly after Kristin, the Directorate-General of Health issued a warning to take precautions regarding food and water safety, as many power outages were reported. More than 4,000 personnel were deployed to the field in the municipality of Pombal. Approximately 700 families were supported and 17,000 meals were served in the Pombal area. The municipality of Pombal created the Pombal Solidarity Local Fund to support the most affected families by Kristin. Around 200 personnel of the Ourém City Council and the Municipal Civil Protection Service were deployed in the municipality of Ourém. The Municipal Exhibition Centre in Ourém was used for the distribution of food and tarpaulins in the municipality of Ourém. In the days after Kristin, the mayor of Leiria asked the population to ration food. The Portuguese Search and Rescue Association was deployed in Leiria and Marinha Grande to support the population. The mayor of Leiria called January 28 one of the darkest days in the municipality of Leiria. The government of Portugal announced on 28 January that they are permanently monitoring the impact of Kristin in Portugal and offered families of the victims its condolences. Furthermore, a state of emergency was declared for 69 municipalities in response to the extraordinary impact of Kristin, which ended on 15 February. Early February, the municipality of Elvas launched a solidarity campaign to collect construction materials for Leiria and Marinha Grande. In the beginning of February, the Portuguese army had 1,245 soldiers deployed on the ground, in 19 municipalities, to support the affected populations. The Leiria City Council and the Institute for Child Support provided psychological support for residents experiencing mental health problems and anxiety as a result of Kristin.

Multiple Portuguese artists, such as Iolanda, Ana Lua Caiano, Ana Mariano, and Marisa Liz, came together in Lisbon on 11 February for a benefit concert to support the victims of storm Kristin, which raised €18,707 in total. All tickets were sold out for the Amor ao Centro benefit concert in Lisbon. Another charity concert was held at 13 February at the Virginia Theatre in Torres Novas. The municipality of Oliveira do Bairro promoted a third solidarity concert on 19 February, by different artists, to raise money to rebuild the municipality. The Portuguese Red Cross distributed around 10,000 tarpaulins to support families whose homes were damaged by Kristin. The Portuguese government announced a support package up to €2.5 billion. The Leiria City Council cancelled the Leiria Fair of 2026 to focus on the reconstruction of the Leiria municipality. The Minister of Agriculture and the Sea José Manuel Fernandes requested the activation of the crisis reserve for agriculture in a letter to the European Commissioner for Agriculture and Food, after estimated losses of around €500 million in the agricultural sector. In Leiria, over 12,128 personnel were mobilized for humanitarian support and recovery. 10 municipalities in the Leiria district provided their population with 1.75 million square metres of tarpaulins and 550,000 roof tiles. 442 tons of food was distributed to 9,827 families in the Leiria district.

By 15 February, there were estimated losses of €1 billion in the agricultural sector. The army and the Intermunicipal Community of Central Alentejo went to support the Leiria region. The Attorney General of the Republic visited Leiria on 10 February to inspect the former Rodrigues Lobo High School, the Palace of Justice, and the building housing the Leiria Administrative and Tax Court. The Portuguese Nurses Association launched a national campaign in early February to collect goods to support people who were affected by Kristin. The Valença Volunteer Firefighters were supporting the population in the Leiria municipality between 30 January and 3 February. The Portuguese Volleyball Federation announced the creation of a support fund for affiliated clubs in the Leiria region affected by Kristin. Maria Lúcia Amaral, the Minister of Home Affairs, has resigned on 10 February amid criticism from oppositional parties and local communities over the government's slow and failed responses to Kristin. On 9 February, the population of Leiria came together for a remembrance. The Leiria Diocesan Caritas distributed 30 tons of food and hygiene products to victims of Kristin. The government of Portugal implemented an emergency housing program for populations affected by Kristin. The Diocese of Angra donated €40,000 to support victims of Kristin.

After Kristin, Ricardo Cardoso, who is a psychologist, published an e-book with the title "O Vento Barulhento" ("The Noisy Wind") for all school clusters in the Leiria district to help children with fear and post-traumatic stress after Kristin. The Artmatriz Cultural Association and the Asteriscos association have created a solidarity playroom in the Leiria area, with the aim of supporting children and young people affected by Kristin. The Confederação Nacional da Agricultura (CNA) expressed its full solidarity with the populations and farmers affected by Kristin. The CNA mentioned that farmers will suffer significant income losses in the months, and even years, after Kristin. By 14 February, the Leiria Diocesan Caritas raised almost €1.6 million for victims of Kristin. By 30 April, the amount of money raised by the Leiria Diocesan Caritas increased to €2.3 million. The Portugal national football team will play its final match for the 2026 World Cup at the Dr. Magalhães Pessoa Stadium, in solidarity with the clubs of the Leiria district. A part of the proceeds from the match will go to the affected clubs and the population in the Leiria district. The parish of Panoias de Cima organized a solidarity festival on 21 February to support victims of Kristin. The Sporting and UD Leiria junior teams wore shirts with "SOS Leiria" to request support for victims of Kristin. According to Maria da Graça Carvalho, the environment minister of Portugal, Kristin was a hurricane and an unprecedented event for the nation. She also stated that it will most likely take more than a year to recover the mainland coastline.

The football and futsal championships were cancelled until 6 March in Leiria. Leiria's Municipal Recovery Plan will last until the end of 2029, according to the mayor. The 2026 edition of the Marinha Grande City Festival has been cancelled due to the significant impact caused by Kristin. An art auction has been organized to raise money for the municipality of Leiria. The municipality of Marinha Grande is appealing for donations of construction materials, hygiene products, and food. Luis Suárez and Gonçalo Inácio visited a fan in Marinha Grande whose house was destroyed by Kristin. The All Star Club charity event, which is approved by the Portuguese Padel Federation, was held on 22 February to support Portuguese clubs affected by Kristin. The municipality of Barcelos granted support to the municipalities of Leiria and Pombal. Kristin was described as "the biggest natural disaster in the contemporary in our country" by the president of the "Rebuilting the Central Region" mission structure. The Portugal Transformation, Recovery and Resilience program has been announced by the Portuguese government as a national program, which will last until 2034, for the recovery of Portugal after Kristin and its successors and to make Portugal safer and more resilient.

A mobile crisis center has been implemented in the critical areas of the Leiria district. The proceeds from the Portugal-Romania match will be donated to the municipalities of Leiria and Coimbra. MEO, Vodafone and NOS will compensate customers who were affected by long-term communication outages after Kristin. The municipality of Leiria spent over €13 million on the humanitarian response to Kristin. The parish of Guarda donated over 6,000 roof tiles to the parish of Monte Redondo in Pombal. More than 150 artists donated works for a solidarity fair on 28 February. One month after Kristin, the distribution center in Marinha Grande still collects food, hygiene products, and household goods to distribute to people. The municipality of Pombal announced in March 2026 that they will increase psychological support and health care, implement a 60% reduction in water bills during the state of emergency, and that they will create Local Civil Protection Units and Community Emergency Centers in all parishes to strengthen the capacity to respond to future extreme events.

The "Solidarity Weekend" initiative, which was held at the Belém Cultural in Lisbon, raised approximately €32,700 for charities in the Leiria district. Pilots João Ferreira and Ricardo Porém raffled 20 co-drives in a partnership with the Leiria City Council to help rebuild Leiria. The Portuguese basketball community has united to support clubs affected by Kristin, through the creation of a solidarity fund promoted by the Portuguese Basketball Federation in partnership with the district associations. The mayor of the municipality of Leiria criticized the Minister of Economy and Territorial Cohesion, Manuel Castro Almeida, in March for blaming the municipalities for delays in aid for the reconstruction of homes affected by Kristin. The municipality of Castelo Branco invited the public to adopt and plant 300 trees on 21 and 28 March to contribute to the recovery and enhancement of the municipality's tree heritage. There were 117 requests for psychological support in the Pombal area after Kristin. The municipality of Ourém decided to make the FeirOurém fair of June 2026 free of charge to compensate for the effects of Kristin. On 24 March, the president of the Intermunicipal Community of the Leiria Region requested urgent support for the Leiria region, as recovery has been very difficult. The radio hosts of the As Três da Manhã (Three in the Morning) programme, which is broadcast on Rádio Renascença, challenged locals to walk 100 km to raise funds for the victims of Kristin. João Pimpão, president of the Meirinhas Parish Council, wrote a book called "How We Responded To Kristin" about the local responses to Kristin.

By March 27, volunteers were still distributing food at the Leiria Stadium to support victims of Kristin. The city council of Coimbra considers the climate crisis a central priority because of Kristin and the risk of a flood in the Mondego River. The Leiria City Council launched free online psychology consultations in April 2026 for young people between the ages of 13 and 18 because of Kristin's impact. A memorial for Kristin will be created in the Leiria National Forest. The Polytechnic Institute of Leiria is studying the impact of Kristin on the population in Leiria. Around 400 volunteers were helping to repair damage in the municipalities of Leiria and Marinha Grande on 14 April. On 22 April, Gisela João gave a benefit concert to support families affected by Kristin in Marinha Grande. A solidarity concert was planned on 26 April to help a family in Coimbra whose house got destroyed by Kristin. In April 2026, the municipality of Vila de Rei planted over 70 trees, as part of a reforestation project following the damage caused by Kristin. The municipality of Ourém introduced traffic restrictions and prohibitions in the Medieval Village between 20 April and 31 May for the purpose of repair work on damage caused by Kristin. The Leiria Run of 2026, which was originally scheduled for early May, has been postponed until September due to the impact of Kristin. The 2026 edition of the annual PLAY – Portuguese Music Awards in Portugal raised over €14,000 for victims of Kristin.

Bullfighters raised more than €41,000 for victims of Kristin and its successors in Alcácer do Sal. The Leiria City Council launched the Memories of the Storms project in April to collect photos and videos of Kristin with the intention to preserve memories, testimonies, and stories that are part of the recent identity of the municipality of Leiria. A study is analyzing the impact of Kristin on income loss in the municipality of Pombal. The motto for the 2026 edition of the Meirinhas Bean Festival was decided to be "sending Kristin to hell," as Meirinhas was one of the worst affected parishes by Kristin. Vodafone Portugal, the Leiria City Council, the Intermunicipal Community of the Leiria Region, Repsol, and the production company MOT - Memories of Tomorrow planned to organize a free concert on 23 May to support people affected by Kristin. The National Defence Information Centre in Monte Real has been temporarily closed since January 28 and the location of the annual National Defense Day has been changed due to damage caused by Kristin. On 29 April, the Intermunicipal Community of Leiria demanded a faster response to storm damage and noticed that Kristin exposed the lack of recovery capacity in Portugal. A benefit concert to raise funds for the areas affected by Kristin has been organized for 5 May in Lisbon, featuring bands and artists such as Capitão Fausto, Tiago Bettencourt, and Carlão. In May 2026, the municipality of Pombal created a support line for the local economy. On 12 May, supporters of the Portuguese climate group Climáximo blocked a road in Lisbon in a protest against the government's response to Kristin. On 12 May 2026, the LeiriaShopping app launched a campaign to collect money for affected organizations. Early June 2026, a reconstruction programme funded by the Jerónimo Martins Foundation, with a total value of €20 million, was launched to rebuild homes, nurseries, and buildings. On 15 September, a Kristin Memorial was inaugurated in the Leiria region. In October, a part of the Leiria Book Fair was dedicated toward Kristin, as several authors were invited to reflect on the aftermath of Kristin.
