= Kalorama (music festival) =

Portuguese music festival

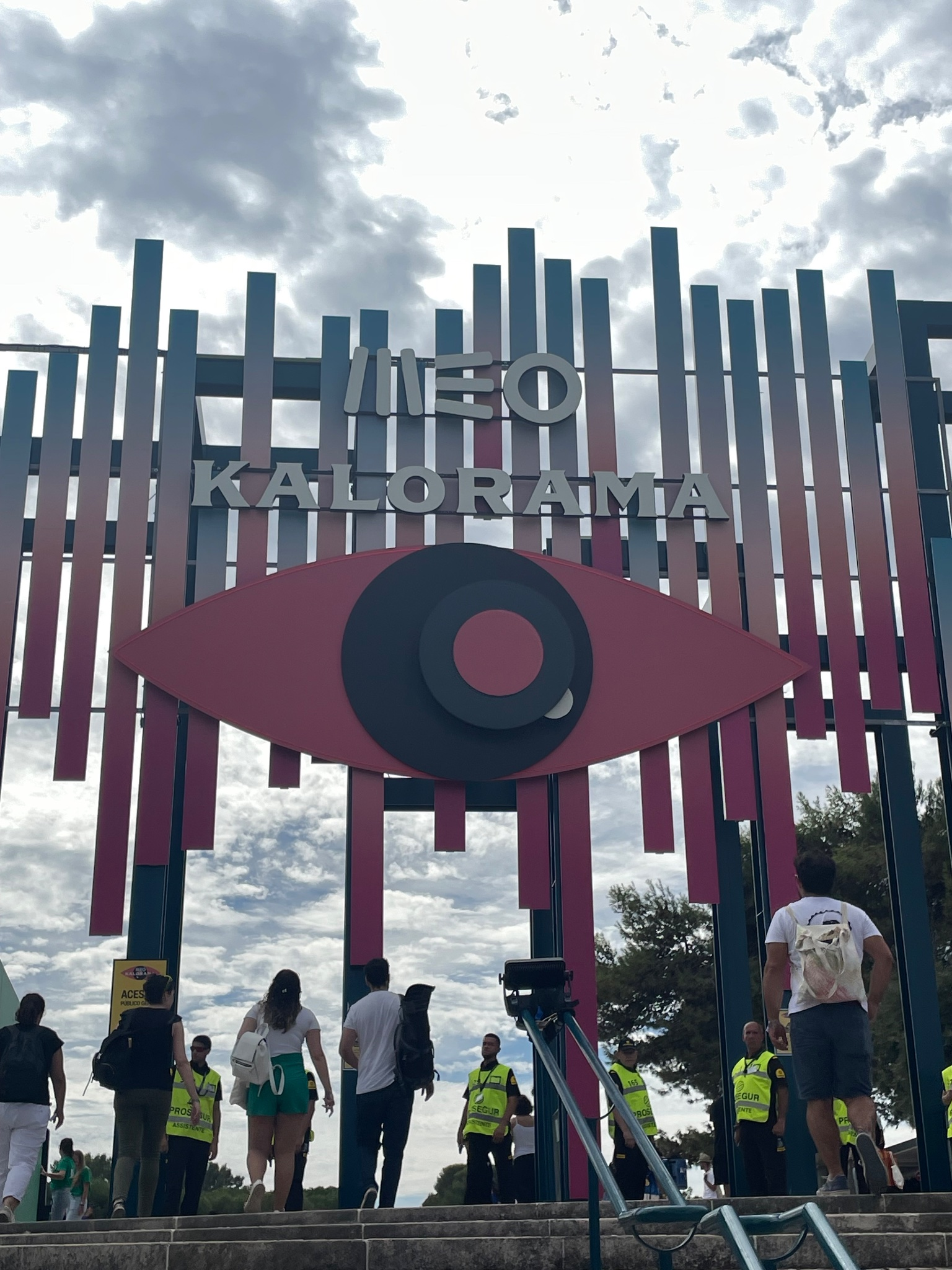
- Entrance of the 2023 edition of MEO Kalorama
- Genre: Rock; pop; electronica
- Dates: Third weekend of June
- Locations: Bela Vista Park, Lisbon (2022–present); IFEMA exhibition ground, Madrid (2024–present)
- Years active: 2022–present
- Organiser: Last Tour
- Website: meokalorama.pt/en

Kalorama (officially named MEO Kalorama for sponsorship reasons) is an annual music festival held since 2022 at the Bela Vista Park in Lisbon, Portugal. It is organized by the Spanish music promoter Last Tour.

For its first three editions, the festival took place on the last weekend of August or the first weekend of September. In 2025 the date was moved to June.

In 2024, a Madrid edition in Madrid was introduced, taking place on the same weekend as the Lisbon edition.

== Lisbon editions ==
Edition	Year	Dates	Attendance	Headliners	Notable acts
1	2022	1–3 September	112.000	The Chemical Brothers, Arctic Monkeys, Nick Cave and the Bad Seeds	Bonobo, Chet Faker, James Blake, Jessie Ware, Kraftwerk, Moderat, Ornatos Violeta, Róisín Murphy, Years & Years
2	2023	31 August–2 September	105.000	Yeah Yeah Yeahs, Florence + The Machine, Arcade Fire	Aphex Twin, Arca, Belle & Sebastian, The Blaze, Foals, FKJ, The Hives, M83, Metronomy, Pablo Vittar, Siouxsie
3	2024	29–31 August 2024		Massive Attack, LCD Soundsystem, Burna Boy	Ana Mariano, Jungle, Loyle Carner, Peggy Gou, The Postal Service + Death Cab for Cutie, Raye, Sam Smith, Yves Tumor
4	2025	19–21 June 2025		Pet Shop Boys, FKA Twigs, Damiano David	Azealia Banks, BadBadNotGood, Father John Misty, Jorja Smith, The Flaming Lips, Róisín Murphy, Scissor Sisters
