= Storm Kristin =

2026 European windstorm in Southwestern Europe

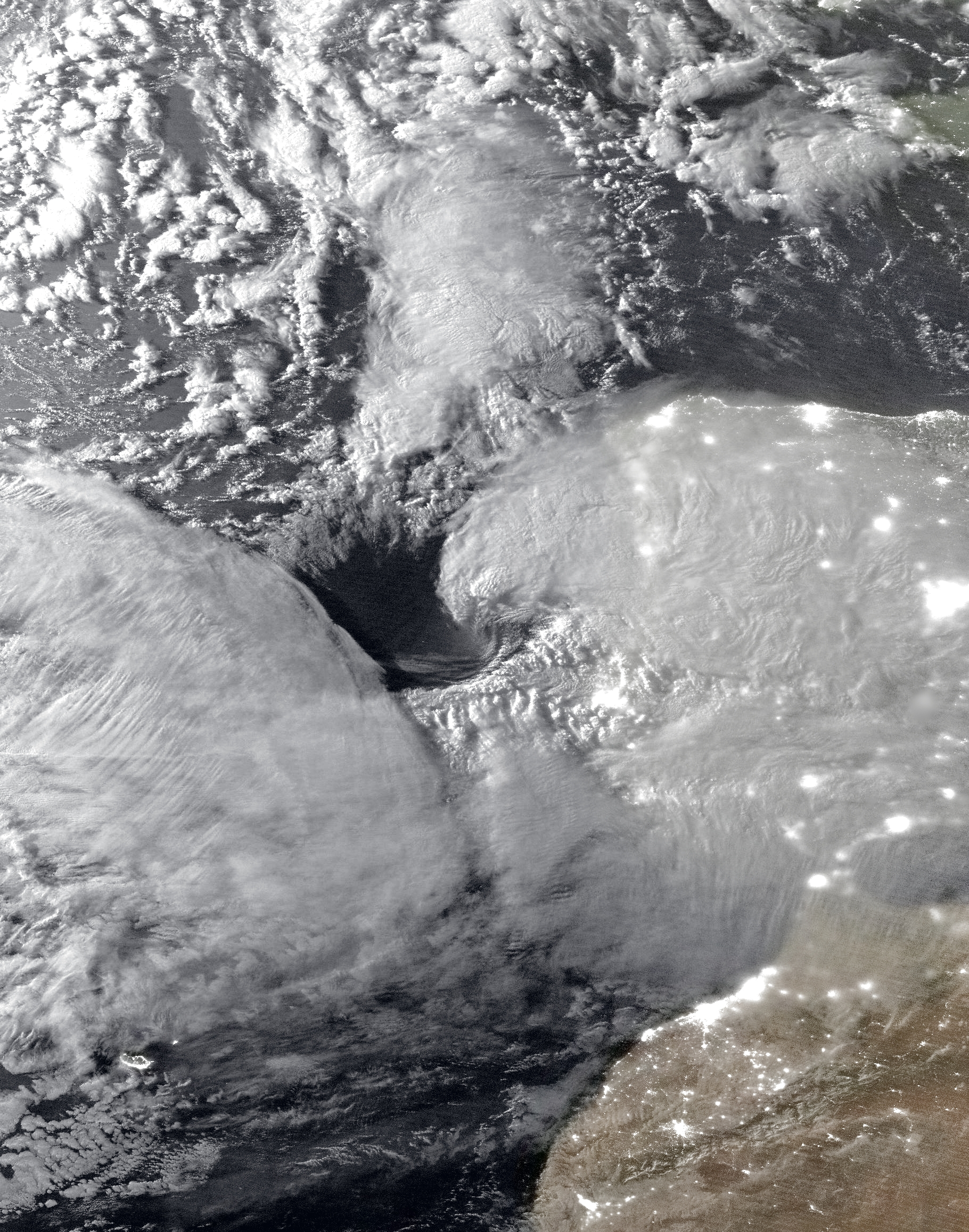
- Satellite imagery of Kristin, a few hours before landfall in the Leiria district.

Meteorological history
- Formed: 27 January 2026
- Dissipated: 31 January 2026

Extratropical cyclone
- Highest gusts: 208.8 km/h (129.7 mph; 58.0 m/s; 112.7 kn) at Soure, Portugal 238 km/h (148 mph; 66 m/s; 129 kn) at an amateur station in Lavos, Portugal
- Lowest pressure: 975 hPa (731.3 mmHg; 28.79 inHg)

Overall effects
- Fatalities: 15 (7 direct, 8 indirect)
- Injuries: 2,189 (184 direct, 2,000 indirect)
- Damage: >€7.2 billion (2026) (Costliest in Portuguese history)
- Areas affected: Portugal, Spain, Gibraltar, Morocco, Italy, Malta, Greece, the Balkans, Ukraine
- Power outages: 1,170,000+
- Part of the 2025–26 European windstorm season

Storm Kristin was a compact, catastrophic and record-breaking extratropical cyclone that severely impacted Portugal, as well as parts of the Mediterranean and Southeastern Europe in late January 2026. Storm Kristin was the twenty-sixth storm of the 2025–26 European windstorm season, and the eleventh to be named by the south-western naming group, which consists of France, Spain, Portugal, Belgium, and Luxembourg. Kristin was named by the IPMA on 27 January, as a significant impact was forecast. Kristin is regarded as one of the worst European windstorms of the 21st century. The impact of Kristin and its successors was described as a humanitarian crisis by a researcher in extreme weather and climate change.

Kristin achieved record-breaking status by rapidly intensifying in the hours before landfall. Kristin made landfall at peak intensity in the Leiria district, which resulted in extremely intense winds in multiple Portuguese districts. The IPMA measured the strongest gust in Portuguese history, surpassing the record of Hurricane Leslie in 2018. The extreme wind gusts of more than 200 km/h were attributed to a sting jet, that developed as the cyclone made landfall. A storm like Kristin had an estimated return period of 80–90 years, based on a reanalysis. Before disappearing, Kristin also affected Spain severely and caused heavy precipitation and thunderstorms in Italy and Greece.

Kristin especially affected the Portuguese districts of Leiria, Coimbra, and Santarém severely, but also affected other districts in Portugal such as the Lisbon district. After moving through Portugal, Kristin also struck Spain with wind gusts of more than 170 km/h. As a result of Kristin, Portugal experienced its largest blackout in history. Around 1,000,000 customers in Portugal were without power, according to E-Redes. Approximately 170,000 customers experienced power outages in Andalusia. Kristin caused long-lasting and widespread communication outages in Portugal, lasting for several months. Kristin was responsible for a significant ecological impact in parts of Portugal, as tens of millions of trees fell, which raised concerns for potential wildfires in the summer of 2026. The storm had a widespread and severe impact on emotional well-being in the affected areas. Kristin prompted national and international solidarity actions and humanitarian aid efforts.

Over 2,000 injuries were reported in Portugal, 177 direct and 2,000 indirect. Furthermore, 14 deaths were attributed to Kristin in Portugal, six direct and eight indirect. One death and 12 injuries were reported in Spain. Estimated monetary losses in Portugal were more than €6 billion, which was more than 1.6% of the country's GDP in 2026, making Kristin the most damaging storm on record for Portugal. Initial government estimates indicated losses of €1.2 billion in Spain, bringing the total amount of losses by Kristin to more than €7.2 billion.

Kristin's successor, storm Leonardo, was responsible for causing major floodings in parts of Portugal, which exacerbated the impact of Kristin.

== Storm name ==
On 27 January, the IPMA used the name "Kristin" for the twenty-sixth storm of the 2025–26 European windstorm season and the eleventh storm to be named by the south-western naming group, as red warnings were issued for parts of Portugal. Kristin is a Scandinavian name and its meanings are "Christian" or "follower of Christ".

== Meteorological history ==
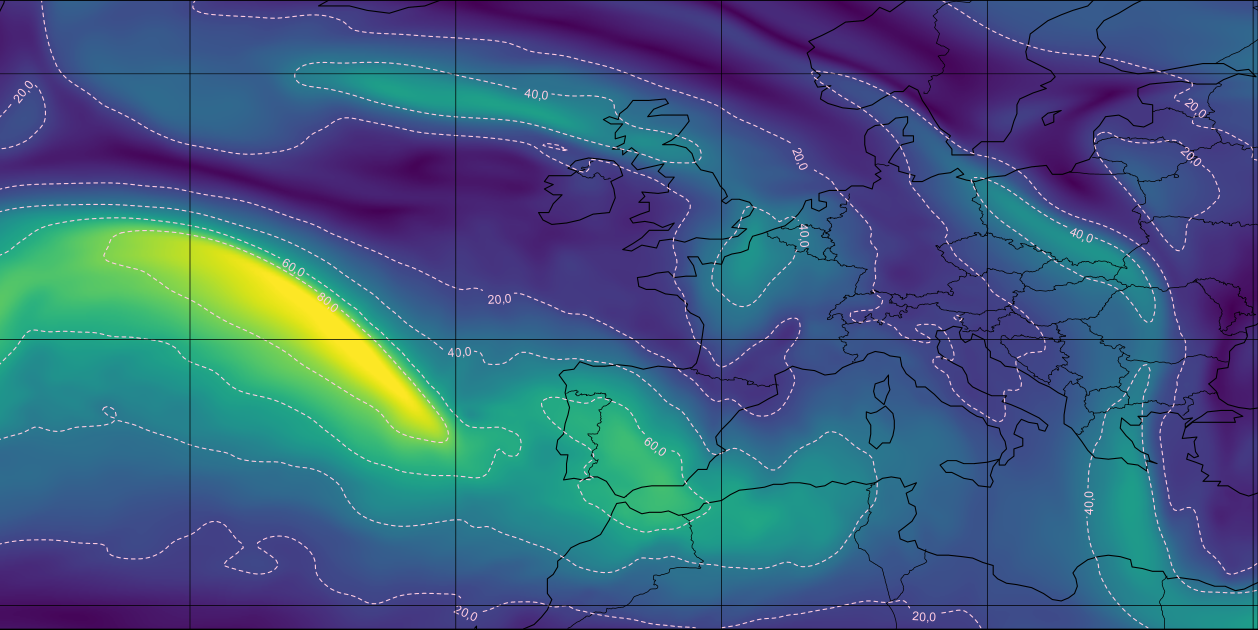
An ERA5 data visualization of the jet stream on January 28 2026.

At the end of January 2026, there was a persistent anticyclonic blocking between Greenland and Scandinavia, which resulted in the polar jet descending in latitude, resulting in a very favorable configuration for the strong development of low-pressure areas. Under influence of storm Joseph, also named Marilu by the FUB, a secondary low formed. This secondary low was named Kristin by the IPMA, as a significant impact was forecast for parts of Portugal.

Enabled by very dynamic and favorable atmospheric conditions, Kristin rapidly intensified in the night before it made landfall. During its explosive cyclogenesis, Kristin deepened to a minimum atmospheric pressure of 975 hPa. In the hours before Kristin made landfall in the Leiria district, the storm developed a sting jet, which is a rare phenomenon that exclusively happens in extratropical cyclones with a warm core.

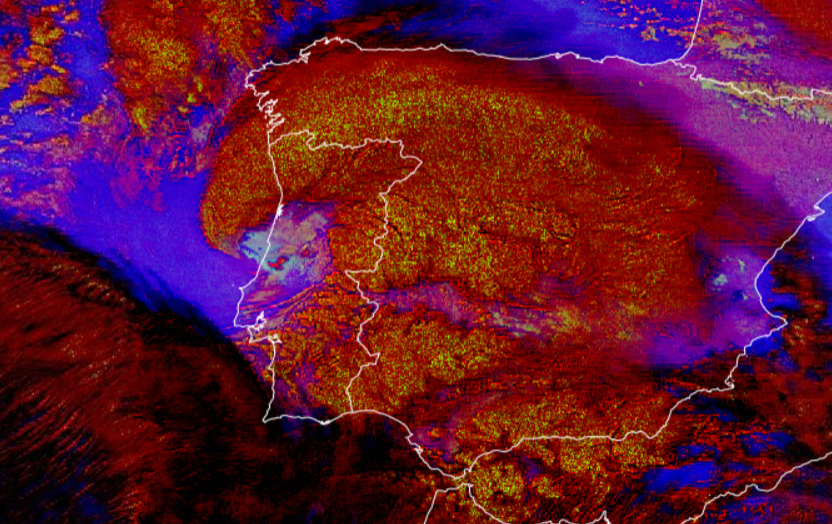
RGB imagery of Kristin at its peak intensity on 28 January 2026 at 04:40 UTC.

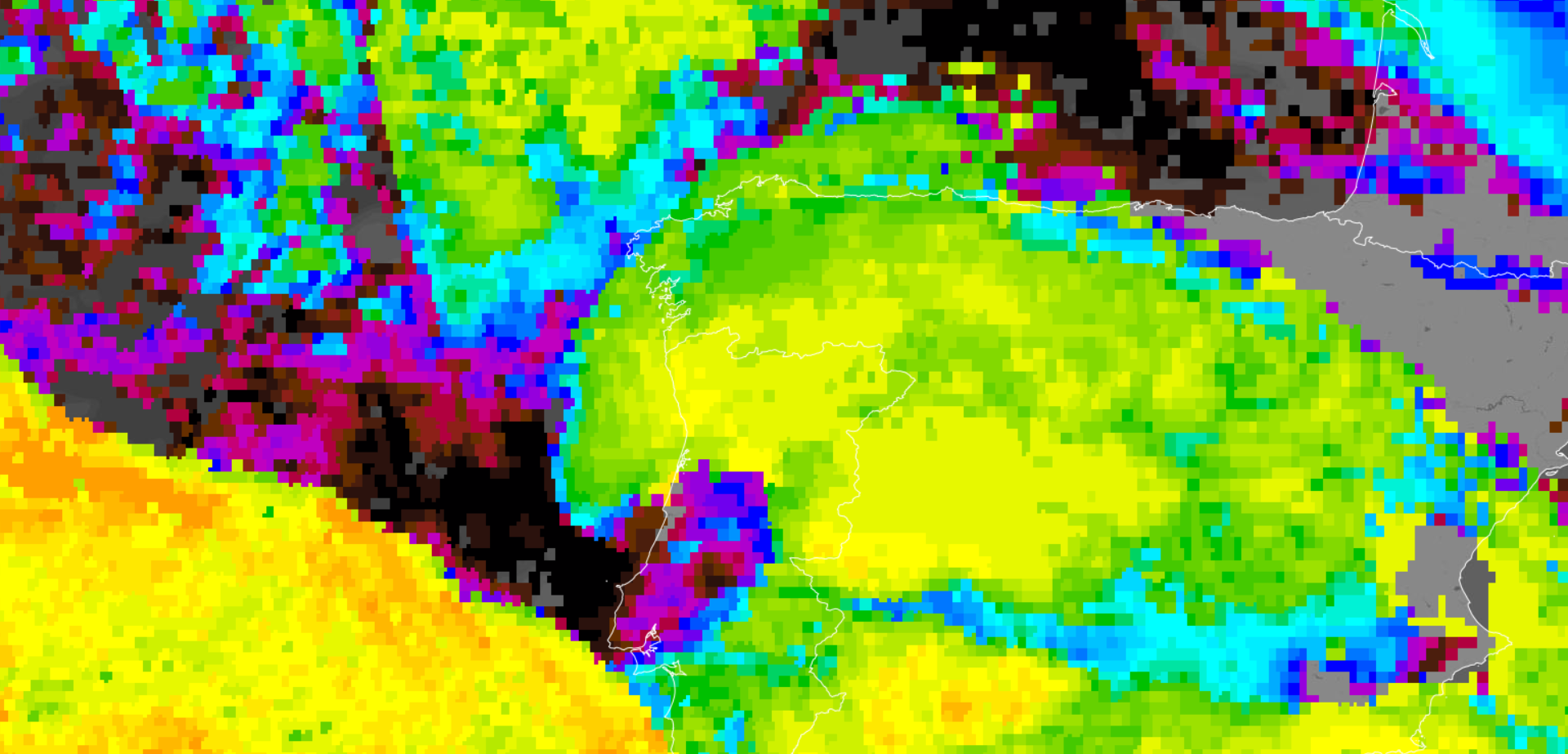
Cloud top height of Kristin on 28 January 2026 at 04:30 UTC.

Around 4:45 AM UTC, January 28, Kristin made landfall as an extremely powerful storm in the Leiria district, with gusts exceeding 200 km/h in some parts of the Leiria and Coimbra districts. In Soure, which is a municipality in the Coimbra district, a gust of 208.8 km/h has been measured, exceeding the previous record of 176.4 km/h by Leslie in 2018. Unofficially, a gust of 238 km/h has been measured in Lavos, which is also a parish in the Coimbra district. The Monte Real Air Base, which is located in the Leiria district, reported a gust of 178 km/h before the anemometer got damaged. The Leiria aerodrome measured a gust of 156.2 km/h, according to the IPMA. Lisbon measured a peak gust of 115 km/h. Doppler weather radar imagery were indicative of wind speeds in excess of 216 km/h (>60 m/s) at an altitude of 600 metres during Kristin's peak intensity.

After moving through Portugal, Kristin caused strong winds and excessive precipitation in Spain. A maximum gust of 174 km/h was measured in Dehesa del Camarate by the AEMET. A gust of 156 km/h was measured in Villena. Gusts of 150.5 km/h were recorded in Benizalón, which is one of the strongest gusts ever recorded in Almería, alongside with gusts of 131 km/h in Carboneras, 124 km/h in Xodos, 118 km/h in Laujar de Andarax, 116.3 km/h in the Calar Alto mountains, 113.8 km/h in Albox, and 111 km/h in Garuccha. A maximum gust of 108 km/h was measured in Cáceres. In A Gándara, a gust of 120.6 km/h was measured. Madrid experienced snow, which happens a couple times per year.

=== Effect of climate change ===
According to a research conducted by Manning et al. (2018), the frequency of extreme windstorms increases with 25–35% as a result of climate change. The main cause is the increased contribution of storms that develop a sting jet as a result of the global warming. Kristin had a sting jet, which was responsible for its intensity, according to the IPMA. Global warming also alters large-scale atmospheric circulations, which contributes to environments being more favorable for rapid cyclogenesis and persistent cyclonic influences.

== Warnings and preparation ==
=== Portugal ===
On 25 January, the first indications for a potentially destructive weather event appeared, according to Duarte Costa. The IPMA issued widespread red warnings on 27 January for the northern and central districts, as gusts up to 140 km/h and an extremely rough sea were forecast. The IPMA also warned that the impact could be catastrophic.

The National Emergency and Civil Protection Authority in Portugal elevated the country to Level 4 (Maximum State of Readiness) in the 24 hours prior to landfall, the highest possible tier of mobilisation. The sandbars in the northern zone were closed and the entrance to Viana do Castelo was restricted. A warning SMS was sent to parts of the country on 27 January by the National Emergency and Civil Protection Authority. The IPMA advised everyone to stay at home during Kristin, to keep their blinds closed, and to protect structures. On 27 January, the Civil Protection agency of Torres Vedras ordered the closure of all schools and advised everyone to not leave home unless necessary. Local authorities closed the access to the Sintra Mountains on 27 January due to Kristin. The municipality of Oliveira do Hospital announced on January 27 that all schools had to close due to Kristin. The municipality of Montanegre also closed their schools on 27 January. The municipality of Coimbra also announced a closure of all schools. In the night of January 28, the municipality of Miranda do Corvo decided to close all schools and to cancel the weekly outdoor market in the municipality. On 27 January, The Municipal Civil Protection of Santarém issued an advice for the population to stay at home and to cancel sporting activities. The Maritime Promenade and some municipal gardens and parks were closed in Oeiras.

=== Spain ===
The AEMET issued a red alert for the interior of Pontevedra for excessive precipitation and parts of the southeast (Almanzora Valley/Almería) for hurricane-force gusts. Orange and yellow alerts covered the Spanish interior for gusts up to 100 km/h, while coastal regions braced for 8-meter waves along the Atlantic. Warnings were issued for the northern plateau, threatening major transport arteries like the A-1 and A-6 motorways.

=== Malta ===
Warnings were issued for Malta, as strong to gale-force winds were forecast. Waves up to 6 metres were also forecast. Fast ferry trips were cancelled on 28 January.

=== Italy and Greece ===
The Italian Civil Protection issued orange alerts for Lazio, Sardinia, and Molise, citing high-speed winds and hydrogeological risks. Red alerts for avalanches were active in the Western Alps. Though the storm was named by IPMA, Greece issued an orange warning for Western Greece and the Aegean, forecasting intense thunderstorms and gale-force winds (9 Beaufort). Much of Southern Italy remained under a State of Emergency due to the compounded risk from the previous Storm Harry, which had already destabilized terrain in Niscemi, Sicily.

== Impact ==
=== Portugal ===
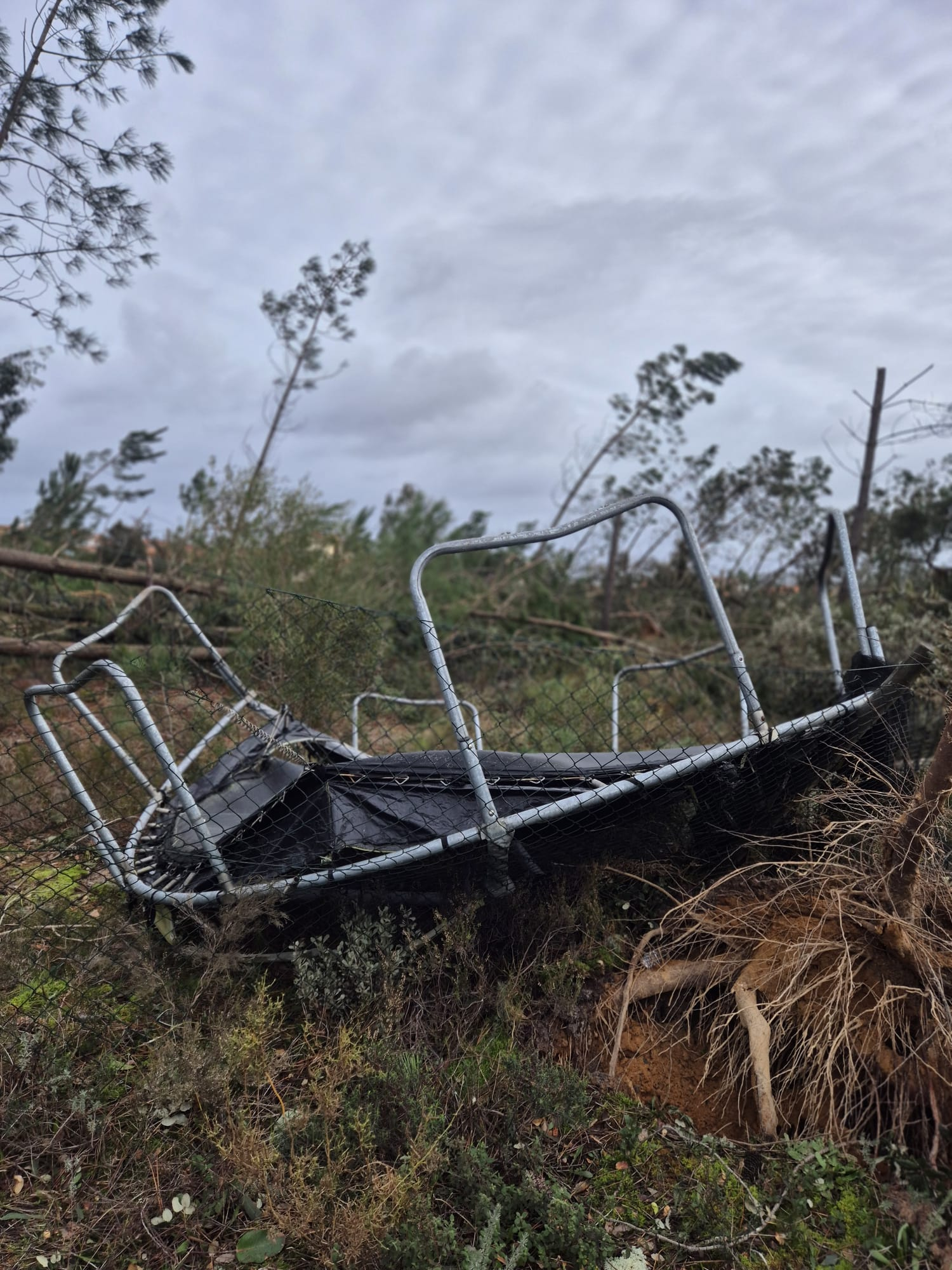
A ruined trampoline found in an undisclosed location, after it was blown away.

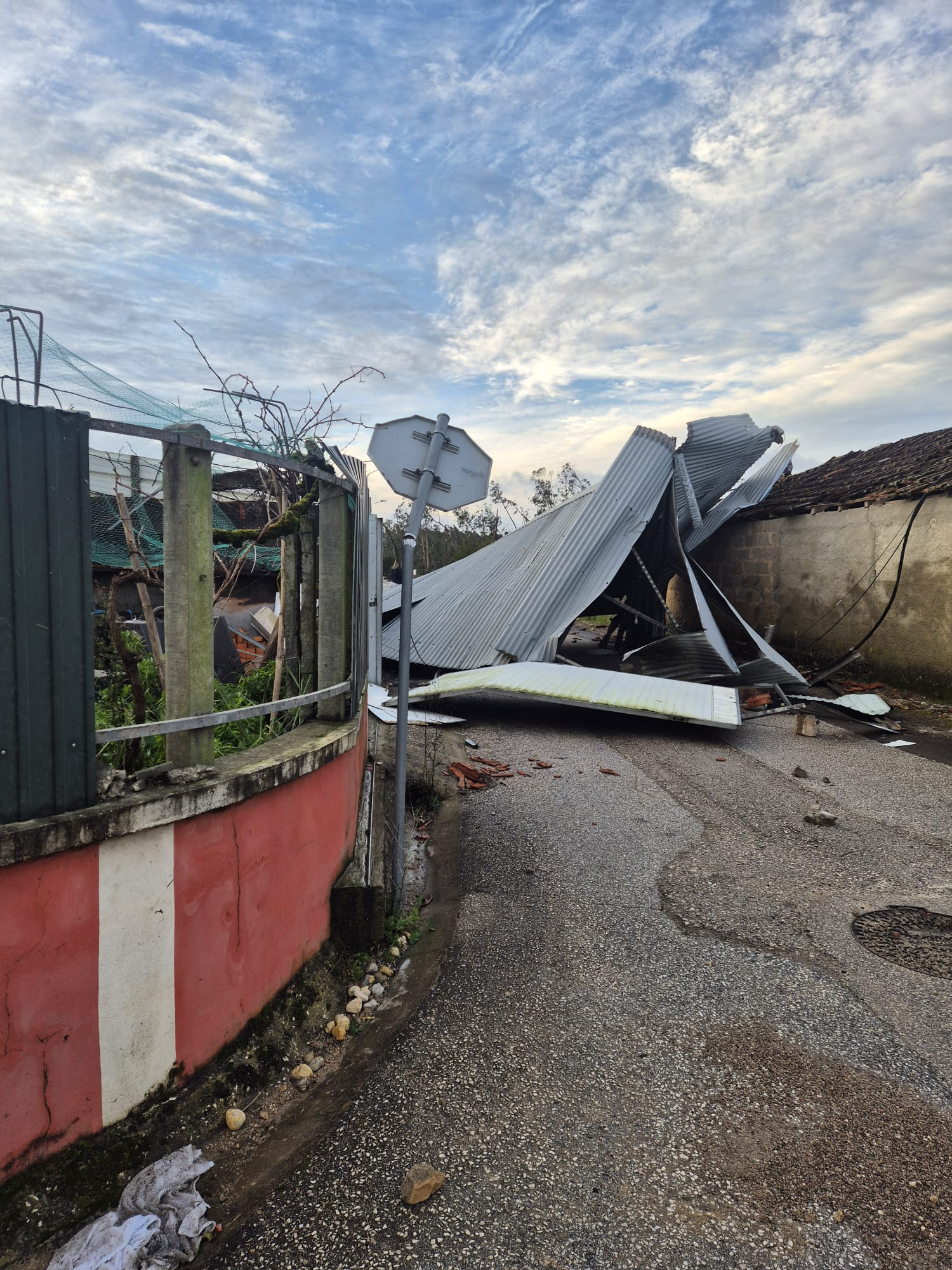
Debris from after the initial disaster, clogging in a Leiria street.

Kristin made landfall as an extremely powerful storm in the Leiria district in the night of 28 January 2026. The storm claimed six lives directly across the country, with fatalities caused by falling trees, structural collapses, and an incident in the Algarve where a woman was swept away by a flooding stream. Another eight people died indirectly, as a result of recovery and cleaning operations, carbon monoxide poisoning by misusage of generators, or suicide in one case, bringing the total amount of deaths by Kristin to 14 in Portugal. One of the eight indirect deaths was an employee of E-Redes, who got electrocuted while repairing electrical structures in Leiria. Kristin caused €6 billion in damage in Portugal, according to the Mission Structure for the Reconstruction of the Central Region. Right after Kristin, nearly one million people—approximately 10% of the population—were left without power. In the Leiria district, around 300,000 people—approximately 64% of the population—lost access to power. More than 300,000 customers were left without telecommunication services. The municipal stadium of Leiria was severely damaged and Kristin damaged the Monte Real air base severely, including parts of the F-16 fighter fleet. Some parishes and municipalities, especially in the Leiria, Coimbra, and Santarém districts, lost all communication. It was estimated that 170 of the 180 companies in the Meirinhas parish lost their roof, as a result of storm Kristin. 95% of all houses were damaged in the Meirinhas parish, where losses exceed €500 million. The Leiria Hospital got overwhelmed by the amount of polytrauma patients in the first days after Kristin. There were 84 people displaced in the municipality of Leiria. 177 people in the Leiria district were directly injured by Kristin. Kristin caused estimated losses of €5 billion in the Leiria district, which is around 65% of its regional GDP. According to the IFRC, 1,163 people were displaced in total.

Nearly all homes in the municipality of Pombal suffered damage and the losses in Portugal were significantly higher than during the 2024 Portugal wildfires and the 2025 Portugal wildfires. A large part of the Leiria National Forest got devastated by Kristin. Between 4,000 and 4,500 homes–around 80% or 85% of the municipality's homes–were estimated to be damaged in Ferreira do Zêzere, according to the mayor there. The mayor of Ferreira do Zêzere estimated that full recovery will take a year and that 70% of the forest cover has fallen. Several houses were damaged in Monte Real. 55 buildings in the municipality of Ourém and 68 buildings in the municipality of Figueiró dos Vinhos experienced a total collapse due to Kristin.

Around 90% of businesses in Marinha Grande reported damage after Kristin. The municipality of Marinha Grande reported ten minor injuries and rehoused 75 people. According to the REN, 61 very high voltage poles and 774 kilometres of REN's very high voltage lines were taken down. The municipality of Figueiró dos Vinhos has 850 houses that suffered roof damage, as a result of Kristin. More than a thousand homes were damaged as a whole in the municipality and there were 30 hectares in the municipal forest of Figueiró dos Vinhos where not a single tree was left standing. The bus terminal of Leiria collapsed, which resulted in around 45 vehicles being damaged. Kristin caused damage to cultural heritage in nearly 20 municipalities, such as the complete destruction of the Charolinha da Mata dos Sete Montes in Tomar and the loss of archaeological complexes at Forto Novo in Loulé. According to the Confederation of Farmers of Portugal, the agricultural and forestry sections suffered losses of €775 million. 25 people were displaced in Alvaiázere and 95% of all businesses and homes were affected there. Furthermore, the local health center in Alvaiázere had to close due to structural damage. At the entrance of Marinha Grande, a group of modular houses were blown away. Along the waterfront of Praia da Vieira, all restaurants had broken windows and there was damage to swimming pools and hotels. 185 church buildings in Portugal suffered significant damage. Pine forests and woodlands were destroyed in the Leiria and Coimbra districts. There were estimated losses of €30 million in the poultry sector, as Kristin led to an expected drop of 5% in egg production. Kristin caused at least €35 million in damage to municipal equipment in Pombal, alongside with at least €80 million in damage to businesses and the displacement of 90 people. Kristin caused €15 million in damage to municipal infrastructure in Nazaré and almost €15 million in damage to public and private property in Porto de Mós. 80% of homes were affected by Kristin in Pedrógão Grande. More than 90 of the 125 clubs in the Leiria Football Association suffered significant damage due to Kristin. According to Bruno Gomes, the mayor of Ferreira do Zêzere, estimated losses exceeded €200 million in the municipality. More than 250 libraries have suffered damage. The total amount of damage in Marinha Grande exceeded €143 million.

Around 10,000 houses have had their roofs blown off in the municipality of Ourém. Around 300 people were displaced and 17 houses were destroyed in Ourém. 97 to 98% of the homes were affected by Kristin in the Caxarias parish. The total amount of damage in the municipality of Leiria exceeded €1 billion. Up to eight million trees fell in the municipality of Leiria. The municipality of Alvaiázere has estimated losses of more than €60 million. Estimated losses in the business sector of Figueira da Foz were several tens of millions of euros. Municipal losses exceeded €15.6 million in the municipality of Batalha. Approximately 90% of the homes in the Arrabal parish were affected by water infiltration. A wooden house was swept away in Arrabal. Losses in Abrantes exceeded €15 million according to the Abrantes City Council. Kristin caused landslides and damage to many homes and roads in the municipality of Abrantes. Kristin caused €17 million in damage to the municipality of Tomar. The municipality of Pedrógão Grande reported damage to more than 800 houses and €12 million in damage to municipal property in a provisional assessment. EDP, which is part of E-Redes, estimated losses of approximately €80 million, which includes damage to electricity grids and generation assets, as well as associated operational costs. Over six thousand kilometres of network were affected by Kristin. 50 substations of E-Redes were damaged. In the coastal strip between Leiria and Figueira da Foz, more than two million cubic metres of pine wood had to be removed. Kristin caused more than €30 million in damage in the municipality of Sertã. 205,000 homes were damaged in Portugal by Kristin. Around a half of the 51,000 homes in the municipality of Leiria suffered damage. Kristin and its successors caused approximately €270 million in damage in Lisbon. Insurance companies in Portugal received over 140,000 claims after Kristin. More than 500 people in Portugal were displaced after Kristin. The municipality of Setúbal reported estimated losses of around €50 million after Kristin. Lourinhã suffered €25 million in damage. The Impact Center for Climate Change estimated that 60% of companies registered in Marinha Grande, Leiria, Ourém, Ferreira do Zêzere, and Pombal suffered damage. The Médio Tejo region suffered €185 million in damage. Kristin caused €42 million in damage to the public infrastructure and €85 million in damage to homes in Ourém.

Kristin destroyed 20% of the national resin production in Portugal. The Beira Baixa Province reported a loss of €86 million. The municipality of Soure reported losses of €25 million. Over 800 businesses and more than 2,200 homes were destroyed in the Leiria district. The Regional Association of Construction and Public Works Industries of Leiria and Ourém estimated early 2026 that full recovery will take between one and a half and two years. 17 people were displaced in the municipality of Rio Maior. Over 4,500 traffic signs were damaged in the municipality of Leiria, alongside with dozens of locations with affected traffic lights. More than 70% of the buildings in the municipality of Vila de Rei experienced roof damage and some businesses in the municipality experienced significant losses. The estimated insured losses are €1.2 billion. Kristin caused €37 million in damage in the municipality of Torres Vedras and 150 homes have suffered severe damage in the municipality. Around 80 to 90% of all roofs of houses in the Vermoil parish were damaged by Kristin. Six people were displaced in the municipality of Batalha. According to André Sousa, the mayor of the municipality of Batalha, hundreds of thousands of trees fell in Batalha. 30 people in the municipality of Alcobaça were displaced. The Lis Valley experienced floods. All buildings in the business park of Marinha Grande were damaged with several roofs blown off and walls destroyed. The Figueira da Foz PSP police division suffered serious damage with broken windows, fallen tiles, and damaged police vehicles at the facilities of that division. The Bissaya Barreto municipal airfield in Coimbra collapsed. The aircraft, which were in the hangar, were damaged, some unrecoverable. Approximately 60% of the roofs in the Bajouca parish were damaged by Kristin. Kristin revealed large amounts of debris and trash at the coast of Nazaré. Most roofs in the Leiria city were damaged. Kristin caused over 700 road closures in Portugal.

=== Spain ===
As the storm moved inland across Spain, it brought a combination of hurricane-force winds and heavy snowfall. In the south, a woman was killed in Málaga by a falling palm tree, and the Almanzora Valley was placed under a red alert for extreme wind gusts. Central Spain faced significant travel chaos as over 170 roads were affected by snow; the A-6 motorway in Madrid was blocked, leaving dozens of drivers stranded. Additionally, the agricultural sector in Huelva and Almería suffered massive losses as torrential rains flooded greenhouses and high winds destroyed berry-producing tunnels. There were 170,000 power outages and 5 injuries reported in Andalusia. Power outages were reported in several towns in Córdoba. Maximum gusts of 99 km/h were reported in Seville, which led to a partial roof collapse of the Plaza Artena sports pavilion in Alcalá del Río and a partial roof collapse of a high school in Lebrija. There were several fallen trees at the Lagunas de Ruidera. A roof collapsed at the CEIP Javier Paulino school in La Solana. Kristin caused significant damage to tunnel and greenhouse structures in Huelva, which affected the soft fruit sector. Nine parks were closed in Madrid due to the heavy snowfall caused by Kristin.

In Extremadura, the storm caused widespread wind- and rain-related incidents, prompting emergency coordination by the regional 112 Extremadura service. Between midnight and 18:00 on 28 January 112 handled 2,500 calls and 455 incidents directly linked to the storm; from 26 January (15:00) to 28 January (18:00), it managed 5,260 calls and 1,462 incidents, including 535 related to the weather alert. Several people were evacuated due to rising river levels as a result of Kristin. Roofs of school sports facilities in Cádiz collapsed. Power pylons collapsed and wires broke in the province of Almería, which resulted in numerous power outages. A landslide occurred in Pinos Puente. 11 schools in Andalusia were damaged by Kristin. The dome of the Faculty of Business Studies in Huelva partially collapsed. More than 200 people in Jimena and San Roque were without power. One day after Kristin, around 900 residents of the province of Seville were still without power.

In the city of Cáceres, municipal incidents included falling trees and branches, as well as detached roof elements and masonry; no injuries were reported locally. A large fallen tree damaged part of a perimeter wall at an educational site, alongside additional tree falls at multiple locations across the city. A wind gust of 108 km/h was reported in Cáceres during the event. Road transport was also disrupted across the region. In the province of Cáceres, seven roads and three rural tracks were reported with circulation problems (snow, river overflows, or waterlogged carriageways), and two trucks overturned on the A-66 due to strong winds. As a precaution, the regional government suspended morning classes across Extremadura on 28 January, citing forecasts of heavy rain, snow and strong gusts; snow warnings specifically covered northern areas of the province of Cáceres. Regional emergency and forest-fire crews (Infoex) were deployed to address material damage, including removal of loose roof tiles and clearing wind-blown objects, in multiple localities—several of them in the province of Cáceres—such as Grimaldo, Casares de Hurdes, Hinojal, Brozas, Valdesalor, Garciaz, Membrío, Bohonal de Ibor, and Garrovillas de Alconétar. According to Cotality, the estimated insured losses are between €40 million and €100 million for Spain. Initial government assessments indicate losses of up to €1.2 billion in Spain.

Gusts of 102 km/h were reported in Jerez de la Frontera, which caused damage to 135 trees. Kristin caused approximately €1.5 million in damage in the municipality of Jimena de la Frontera, as 80% of the municipality's public infrastructure was affected. Road accidents increased by 31% during Kristin. Kristin caused approximately €2.5 million in damage in the municipality of Cáceres. Kristin caused communication outages in the northern part of Cácares, Campiña Sur, and Serena. Kristin caused waves of more than four metres in the Strait of Gibraltar. Thousands of trucks were stranded on 28 January in and around the Port of Algeciras. Around 45 mm of precipitation fell in El Ejido, which led to floodings in low lying areas. The Strait of Gibraltar experienced gusts in excess of 110 km/h. An electrical tower fell on a vehicle in Alicante. The wall of the IES El Brocense school in Cáceres collapsed due to Kristin. A wall of the football stadium in Motril partially collapsed. Hundreds of power outages were reported in Santiago de Compostela. Six people were injured in Jerez de la Frontera due to a collapsed roof in a restaurant. One person was injured in Altea due to a tree falling on a school. Windmills in Consuegra were damaged by Kristin.

==== Balearic Islands ====
There were 19 fallen trees reported on the Balearic Islands, alongside with six floods. 79 incidents were reported on the islands, 49 of them being on Ibiza. Landslides were reported.

=== Morocco ===
The northern and coastal areas of Morocco experienced wind gusts of 80-120 km/h, heavy rain, and high waves. Tetuan measured a wind gust of 117 km/h, according to observations. Severe floodings were reported in the northern part of Morocco. The Tangier port was closed.

=== Italy ===
In Italy, the arrival of Kristin compounded a pre-existing state of emergency in the south, following the damage already inflicted by Storm Harry that affected the country a week before Kristin. The Italian Civil Protection Department issued orange alerts for Lazio, Sardinia, and Molise due to the risk of landslides and torrential rain, particularly threatening the town of Niscemi, Sicily, where a massive 4km-long landslide remained active. In the north, the storm triggered high-level avalanche warnings in the Western Alps, while transport networks faced widespread delays, with rail protocols activated to allow for emergency rebookings as gale-force winds hit the Mediterranean coast.

== Aftermath ==
=== Portugal ===
Right after Kristin, the majority of the homes in the Leiria district were without electricity, water, and communications. There was a lack of food and water in the Leiria district. Kristin caused disruptions to food distribution. In the days after Kristin, businesses in Marinha Grande were reportedly looted. Directly after Kristin, there were fuel shortages in the Leiria district. Many elderly people in the municipality of Marinha Grande had nothing to eat, as Marinha Grande was completely isolated. By 2 February, approximately 147,000 customers of E-Redes still experienced power outages. By 5 February, the amount of customers of E-Redes without power decreased to 86,000. The Leiria, Coimbra, and Santarém districts reported a significant decrease of committed property crimes in the week after Kristin. On 11 February, two weeks after Kristin, 39,000 clients of E-Redes still experienced power outages, most of them being from the Leiria district. By 13 February, only 45% of the people in the municipality of Vila de Rei had access to communications. By the evening of 14 February, 26,000 customers of E-Redes did not have access to electricity. Three weeks after Kristin, Ferreira do Zêzere still had areas without power and communication. By 14 February, there were still 10,000 households without power in the municipality of Leiria. By 18 February, three weeks after Kristin, there were still 7,600 customers without power and almost 84,000 users without communication. On 22 February, there were still more than 270 km of railway, which is approximately 10% of the Portuguese rail network, without trains running. On February 22, there were still 1,800 customers of E-Redes without power. By 26 February, E-Redes claimed that it restored power to nearly all customers in Portugal, aside from a few specific situations.

Regardless of the claim of E-Redes, 219 homes in the municipality of Leiria still did not have electricity by February 26. By 27 February, the energy supply in Vieira de Leiria remains weak and communication keeps failing. According to the Portuguese Federation of Pig Farmers Associations (FPAS), 48 pig farms in the municipality of Leiria still did not have power on 27 February. FPAS also claimed that thousands of families and hundreds of businesses still experience power outages. By the end of February, more than 7,600 tons of waste remained uncollected in the municipality of Leiria. One month after Kristin, many restaurants and shops were still closed in Vieira de Leiria, as they suffered extensive damage. One month after Kristin, around 53,200 customers remained without communication. Full recovery of the communication network would take another year to a year and a half, according to an estimate of the president of the National Communications Authority. In the town of Pilado, around 800 people were without electricity for 35 days. By 2 March, more than 51,000 customers were still without communication. By 6 March, 2,400 kilometres of forest roads had to be cleared in the municipality of Pombal. Around one month and a half after Kristin, many companies in the Leiria region did not recover yet. By 9 March, postal services in the Alqueidão parish were still suspended. One month and a half after Kristin, debris still filled dumps in Leiria and spilled onto roads. Almost two months after Kristin, more than 30 local radio stations were still affected.

By 23 March, there were still 69 people displaced in the municipality of Ourém, alongside with some public lighting failures and many communication outages in Ourém. On 23 March, the electricity supply in the affected areas was at almost 100%, aside from isolated cases. According to the mayor of Leiria, Kristin will have a very large influence on the increase of unemployment in the Leiria region. Economic activity decreased in the first quarter of 2026 and the country is facing serious economic losses caused by Kristin, according to Álvaro Santos Pereira, the governor of the Bank of Portugal. Two months after Kristin, the situation in Ferreira do Zêzere was still far from normal. By 27 March, almost all forest roads in Pedrogão Grande remained impassible. Two months after Kristin, there were still roads closed and sewage systems damaged in the municipality of Torres Vedras. According to the mayor of Leiria, 50% of the population in the Leiria region was still without communication, two months after Kristin. By 29 March, there were still several villages in Ferreira do Zêzere without communication. By 29 March, União de Leiria still played away from home because the Leiria Municipal Stadium was still damaged. On 29 March, there were still roads in the municipality of Leiria that were impassible. Kristin led to a 4.4% drop in industrial production in February 2026. The 90 most affected municipalities experienced a 6.7% drop in overnight stays by non-residents.

By 31 March, there were still 3,000 households and businesses without communication in the municipality of Pombal. By 1 April, there were still many people without communication in the municipality of Tomar. By 2 April, the village of Pé da Serra was still without communication. By 7 April, the municipality of Ferreira do Zêzere still experienced energy and communication failures. By April 10, dozens of families in the municipality of Ourém were still in temporary housing. By April 15, 1,058 kilometres of the forest road network in the Leiria district had been cleared, less than a quarter of the total amount that had to be cleared. Thousands of customers in the central region of Portugal were still without landline phone service, almost three months after Kristin. By 19 April, there were still no communications in parts of the city of Pombal. By 21 April, many roads in the Coimbra district were still closed and there were still fallen poles. Some schools, especially in Leiria and Marinha Grande, experienced internet connectivity problems when they conducted practice exams in April. Three months after Kristin, farmers still received insufficient aid. By 24 April, there were still many communication failures in the Santarém district. On 24 April, more than half of the Ferreira do Zêzere area still experienced lack of telecommunications and communication problems remained widespread in the municipality of Mação. By 25 April, around 20% of the population of Figueiró dos Vinhos remained without internet and television. On 25 April, many restaurants and bars in Praia da Vieira were still closed due to the destruction caused by Kristin.

Kristin has significantly impacted the local economic fabric in the municipality of Pombal. By 25 April, around 20,000 customers in Portugal were still without communication. On 25 April, several homes and areas in the municipality of Leiria were still without internet, television, and landline communications. By 26 April, there was still no electricity on the main avenue of Praia de Vieira. 3 months after Kristin, devastation to homes, businesses, and factories was still visible in the Leiria district, as well as fallen telecommunication poles and destroyed forests. Trails in the Pinhal de Leiria forest were reported to have a lack of shade due to most trees being damaged. On 28 April, one third of the population of Leiria was still without landline phone services, internet, and television. By 28 April, there were still several companies closed or with limited production due to the damage caused by Kristin. The national GDP growth in the first quarter of 2026 was zero. At the end of April, some major roads were still closed in the Leiria district. By April 30, many roads in the municipality of Ferreira do Zêzere still had to be cleared. By 4 May, there were still several communications and electricity issues in the municipality of Tomar and the public lightning in the Olalhas parish still does not work. 100 days after Kristin, the Vale de Cavalos parish was still without communications. By 6 May, thousands of people in the Leiria district were still waiting for aid and Praia da Vieira struggled with its recovery. In the first three months after Kristin, the psychological support teams of the Leiria City Council provided 406 consultations, as Kristin was a traumatic experience for many people. By 7 May, the electricity network in Leiria still has not recovered.

On 13 May, several areas in the municipalities of Mação, Ferreira do Zêzere, and Tomar still experienced significant communication failures. Four months after the storm, almost six out of ten people in the Leiria district reported a high or extreme impact on their emotional well-being. By 31 May, there were still several areas without communication. By 1 June, there were still displaced people and roads remained destroyed. By 2 July, there were still 2,600 homes without fixed-line communications. Almost seven months after Kristin, there were still damaged houses and impassable roads in Leiria. By 29 August, there were still 1,000 fixed-line communications network connections affected in the Leiria district. The significant increase of rural fires in the Leiria region in 2026 was partially attributed to the aftermath of Kristin. By 17 September, accumulation of debris and asbestos caused by Kristin remained a significant problem in the municipality of Marinha Grande. Almost eight months after Kristin, there were still houses that had to be rebuilt in the Leiria district. By 28 September, there were still 73 families displaced in the Leiria district. By 2 October, there was still widespread damage visible in the Leiria district and students in Praia de Vieira still had classes in containers, as school buildings remained closed due to the damage. By 20 October, there were still many roofs damaged and several streets without lighting in the Bidoeira parish. Nine months after Kristin, over 15,000 tons of waste and debris had been collected in the municipality of Leiria.

== Reactions ==
=== International ===
Pope Leo XIV expressed his condolences for those who have died and spiritual closeness to their families. He, reportedly, felt deeply close to the situation of the injured, the displaced, and all those who have been affected by the extensive damage caused by Kristin. Ursula von der Leyen, the president of the European Commission, expressed her deepest solidarity on X. According to Ursula von der Leyen, the European Union stands ready to support Portugal's recovery. Roberta Metsola, the president of the European Parliament, expressed solidarity with Portugal and thanked those who "are working tirelessly, day and night, to protect lives and restore services," alongside with sharing the grief of those who have lost loved ones. Dan Jørgensen, the commissioner for Energy and Housing of the European Commission, visited one of the most affected areas by Kristin on 30 January and mentioned on X that Europe stands in full solidarity with Portugal.

The Italian Embassy in Lisbon expressed their deepest solidarity with Portugal and its people. The Irish Embassy in Lisbon also expressed its deepest solidarity with Portugal after the severe impact of Kristin. The Israeli Ambassador of Portugal visited Marinha Grande to express solidarity with the victims and to deliver water and food, he also mentioned that the tragedy coincided with Tu BiShvat. The Embassy of the Netherlands expressed its deepest solidarity with all those affected by Kristin and offered its heartfelt condolences to the victims. Oana Țoiu, the Minister of Foreign Affairs in Romania, mentioned that she stands in full solidarity with Portugal and that Romania is ready to lend support to the Portuguese government in recovering from Kristin. The president of Slovenia, Nataša Pirc Musar, announced that she is deeply saddened by the impact of Kristin, alongside with extending heartfelt condolences to the families of the victims, expressing her deepest solidarity with all the affected communities, and conveying support to the Portuguese people and president.

The Ministry of Foreign Affairs in the United Arab Emirates offered its heartfelt condolences and solidarity to Portugal following Kristin and called the event a national tragedy. Albania expressed full solidarity with the Government of Portugal and all those affected by the tragic loss and widespread damage caused by Kristin, alongside with mentioning that their thoughts are with the Portuguese people during this difficult time. Irish teams from the ESB Group are helping to restore electricity in the Leiria region, as a reciprocation for the support of E-Redes in Ireland after storm Éowyn in 2025. The European Commissioner for Agriculture and Food visited farms in the municipalities of Leira and Pombal on 17 February. The European Commission disbursed €14.9 billion to Portugal for the Recovery and Resilience Plan. The Portuguese community in France sent over 100 tons of aid to the Leiria district after Kristin. The municipalities of Ansião and Ourém received nearly thirty tons of aid from Luxembourg. The Chinese community in Portugal donated materials to support the reconstruction of the Leiria district. On 1 March, a benefit concert was held in Rheine to support Leiria. In September 2026, the Bairrada Association of Luxembourg will deliver household appliances to families affected by Kristin in Ourém. In October 2026, the coach of France's national hockey team raised attention on Kristin's impact and made an appeal for a sports hall to be rebuilt in Marinha Grande.

=== Portugal ===
Directly after Kristin, the Directorate-General of Health issued a warning to take precautions regarding food and water safety, as many power outages were reported. More than 4,000 personnel were deployed to the field in the municipality of Pombal. Approximately 700 families were supported and 17,000 meals were served in the Pombal area. The municipality of Pombal created the Pombal Solidarity Local Fund to support the most affected families by Kristin. Around 200 personnel of the Ourém City Council and the Municipal Civil Protection Service were deployed in the municipality of Ourém. The Municipal Exhibition Centre in Ourém was used for the distribution of food and tarpaulins in the municipality of Ourém. In the days after Kristin, the mayor of Leiria asked the population to ration food. The Portuguese Search and Rescue Association was deployed in Leiria and Marinha Grande to support the population. The mayor of Leiria called January 28 one of the darkest days in the municipality of Leiria. The government of Portugal announced on 28 January that they are permanently monitoring the impact of Kristin in Portugal and offered families of the victims its condolences. Furthermore, a state of emergency was declared for 69 municipalities in response to the extraordinary impact of Kristin, which ended on 15 February. Early February, the municipality of Elvas launched a solidarity campaign to collect construction materials for Leiria and Marinha Grande. In the beginning of February, the Portuguese army had 1,245 soldiers deployed on the ground, in 19 municipalities, to support the affected populations. The Leiria City Council and the Institute for Child Support provided psychological support for residents experiencing mental health problems and anxiety as a result of Kristin.

Multiple Portuguese artists, such as Iolanda, Ana Lua Caiano, Ana Mariano, and Marisa Liz, came together in Lisbon on 11 February for a benefit concert to support the victims of storm Kristin, which raised €18,707 in total. All tickets were sold out for the Amor ao Centro benefit concert in Lisbon. Another charity concert was held at 13 February at the Virginia Theatre in Torres Novas. The municipality of Oliveira do Bairro promoted a third solidarity concert on 19 February, by different artists, to raise money to rebuild the municipality. The Portuguese Red Cross distributed around 10,000 tarpaulins to support families whose homes were damaged by Kristin. The Portuguese government announced a support package up to €2.5 billion. The Leiria City Council cancelled the Leiria Fair of 2026 to focus on the reconstruction of the Leiria municipality. The Minister of Agriculture and the Sea José Manuel Fernandes requested the activation of the crisis reserve for agriculture in a letter to the European Commissioner for Agriculture and Food, after estimated losses of around €500 million in the agricultural sector. In Leiria, over 12,128 personnel were mobilized for humanitarian support and recovery. 10 municipalities in the Leiria district provided their population with 1.75 million square metres of tarpaulins and 550,000 roof tiles. 442 tons of food was distributed to 9,827 families in the Leiria district.

By 15 February, there were estimated losses of €1 billion in the agricultural sector. The army and the Intermunicipal Community of Central Alentejo went to support the Leiria region. The Attorney General of the Republic visited Leiria on 10 February to inspect the former Rodrigues Lobo High School, the Palace of Justice, and the building housing the Leiria Administrative and Tax Court. The Portuguese Nurses Association launched a national campaign in early February to collect goods to support people who were affected by Kristin. The Valença Volunteer Firefighters were supporting the population in the Leiria municipality between 30 January and 3 February. The Portuguese Volleyball Federation announced the creation of a support fund for affiliated clubs in the Leiria region affected by Kristin. Maria Lúcia Amaral, the Minister of Home Affairs, has resigned on 10 February amid criticism from oppositional parties and local communities over the government's slow and failed responses to Kristin. On 9 February, the population of Leiria came together for a remembrance. The Leiria Diocesan Caritas distributed 30 tons of food and hygiene products to victims of Kristin. The government of Portugal implemented an emergency housing program for populations affected by Kristin. The Diocese of Angra donated €40,000 to support victims of Kristin.

After Kristin, Ricardo Cardoso, who is a psychologist, published an e-book with the title "O Vento Barulhento" ("The Noisy Wind") for all school clusters in the Leiria district to help children with fear and post-traumatic stress after Kristin. The Artmatriz Cultural Association and the Asteriscos association have created a solidarity playroom in the Leiria area, with the aim of supporting children and young people affected by Kristin. The Confederação Nacional da Agricultura (CNA) expressed its full solidarity with the populations and farmers affected by Kristin. The CNA mentioned that farmers will suffer significant income losses in the months, and even years, after Kristin. By 14 February, the Leiria Diocesan Caritas raised almost €1.6 million for victims of Kristin. By 30 April, the amount of money raised by the Leiria Diocesan Caritas increased to €2.3 million. The Portugal national football team will play its final match for the 2026 World Cup at the Dr. Magalhães Pessoa Stadium, in solidarity with the clubs of the Leiria district. A part of the proceeds from the match will go to the affected clubs and the population in the Leiria district. The parish of Panoias de Cima organized a solidarity festival on 21 February to support victims of Kristin. The Sporting and UD Leiria junior teams wore shirts with "SOS Leiria" to request support for victims of Kristin. According to Maria da Graça Carvalho, the environment minister of Portugal, Kristin was a hurricane and an unprecedented event for the nation. She also stated that it will most likely take more than a year to recover the mainland coastline.

The football and futsal championships were cancelled until 6 March in Leiria. Leiria's Municipal Recovery Plan will last until the end of 2029, according to the mayor. The 2026 edition of the Marinha Grande City Festival has been cancelled due to the significant impact caused by Kristin. An art auction has been organized to raise money for the municipality of Leiria. The municipality of Marinha Grande is appealing for donations of construction materials, hygiene products, and food. Luis Suárez and Gonçalo Inácio visited a fan in Marinha Grande whose house was destroyed by Kristin. The All Star Club charity event, which is approved by the Portuguese Padel Federation, was held on 22 February to support Portuguese clubs affected by Kristin. The municipality of Barcelos granted support to the municipalities of Leiria and Pombal. Kristin was described as "the biggest natural disaster in the contemporary in our country" by the president of the "Rebuilting the Central Region" mission structure. The Portugal Transformation, Recovery and Resilience program has been announced by the Portuguese government as a national program, which will last until 2034, for the recovery of Portugal after Kristin and its successors and to make Portugal safer and more resilient.

A mobile crisis center has been implemented in the critical areas of the Leiria district. The proceeds from the Portugal-Romania match will be donated to the municipalities of Leiria and Coimbra. MEO, Vodafone and NOS will compensate customers who were affected by long-term communication outages after Kristin. The municipality of Leiria spent over €13 million on the humanitarian response to Kristin. The parish of Guarda donated over 6,000 roof tiles to the parish of Monte Redondo in Pombal. More than 150 artists donated works for a solidarity fair on 28 February. One month after Kristin, the distribution center in Marinha Grande still collects food, hygiene products, and household goods to distribute to people. The municipality of Pombal announced in March 2026 that they will increase psychological support and health care, implement a 60% reduction in water bills during the state of emergency, and that they will create Local Civil Protection Units and Community Emergency Centers in all parishes to strengthen the capacity to respond to future extreme events.

The "Solidarity Weekend" initiative, which was held at the Belém Cultural in Lisbon, raised approximately €32,700 for charities in the Leiria district. Pilots João Ferreira and Ricardo Porém raffled 20 co-drives in a partnership with the Leiria City Council to help rebuild Leiria. The Portuguese basketball community has united to support clubs affected by Kristin, through the creation of a solidarity fund promoted by the Portuguese Basketball Federation in partnership with the district associations. The mayor of the municipality of Leiria criticized the Minister of Economy and Territorial Cohesion, Manuel Castro Almeida, in March for blaming the municipalities for delays in aid for the reconstruction of homes affected by Kristin. The municipality of Castelo Branco invited the public to adopt and plant 300 trees on 21 and 28 March to contribute to the recovery and enhancement of the municipality's tree heritage. There were 117 requests for psychological support in the Pombal area after Kristin. The municipality of Ourém decided to make the FeirOurém fair of June 2026 free of charge to compensate for the effects of Kristin. On 24 March, the president of the Intermunicipal Community of the Leiria Region requested urgent support for the Leiria region, as recovery has been very difficult. The radio hosts of the As Três da Manhã (Three in the Morning) programme, which is broadcast on Rádio Renascença, challenged locals to walk 100 km to raise funds for the victims of Kristin. João Pimpão, president of the Meirinhas Parish Council, wrote a book called "How We Responded To Kristin" about the local responses to Kristin.

By March 27, volunteers were still distributing food at the Leiria Stadium to support victims of Kristin. The city council of Coimbra considers the climate crisis a central priority because of Kristin and the risk of a flood in the Mondego River. The Leiria City Council launched free online psychology consultations in April 2026 for young people between the ages of 13 and 18 because of Kristin's impact. A memorial for Kristin will be created in the Leiria National Forest. The Polytechnic Institute of Leiria is studying the impact of Kristin on the population in Leiria. Around 400 volunteers were helping to repair damage in the municipalities of Leiria and Marinha Grande on 14 April. On 22 April, Gisela João gave a benefit concert to support families affected by Kristin in Marinha Grande. A solidarity concert was planned on 26 April to help a family in Coimbra whose house got destroyed by Kristin. In April 2026, the municipality of Vila de Rei planted over 70 trees, as part of a reforestation project following the damage caused by Kristin. The municipality of Ourém introduced traffic restrictions and prohibitions in the Medieval Village between 20 April and 31 May for the purpose of repair work on damage caused by Kristin. The Leiria Run of 2026, which was originally scheduled for early May, has been postponed until September due to the impact of Kristin. The 2026 edition of the annual PLAY – Portuguese Music Awards in Portugal raised over €14,000 for victims of Kristin.

Bullfighters raised more than €41,000 for victims of Kristin and its successors in Alcácer do Sal. The Leiria City Council launched the Memories of the Storms project in April to collect photos and videos of Kristin with the intention to preserve memories, testimonies, and stories that are part of the recent identity of the municipality of Leiria. A study is analyzing the impact of Kristin on income loss in the municipality of Pombal. The motto for the 2026 edition of the Meirinhas Bean Festival was decided to be "sending Kristin to hell," as Meirinhas was one of the worst affected parishes by Kristin. Vodafone Portugal, the Leiria City Council, the Intermunicipal Community of the Leiria Region, Repsol, and the production company MOT - Memories of Tomorrow planned to organize a free concert on 23 May to support people affected by Kristin. The National Defence Information Centre in Monte Real has been temporarily closed since January 28 and the location of the annual National Defense Day has been changed due to damage caused by Kristin. On 29 April, the Intermunicipal Community of Leiria demanded a faster response to storm damage and noticed that Kristin exposed the lack of recovery capacity in Portugal. A benefit concert to raise funds for the areas affected by Kristin has been organized for 5 May in Lisbon, featuring bands and artists such as Capitão Fausto, Tiago Bettencourt, and Carlão. In May 2026, the municipality of Pombal created a support line for the local economy. On 12 May, supporters of the Portuguese climate group Climáximo blocked a road in Lisbon in a protest against the government's response to Kristin. On 12 May 2026, the LeiriaShopping app launched a campaign to collect money for affected organizations. Early June 2026, a reconstruction programme funded by the Jerónimo Martins Foundation, with a total value of €20 million, was launched to rebuild homes, nurseries, and buildings. On 15 September, a Kristin Memorial was inaugurated in the Leiria region. In October, a part of the Leiria Book Fair was dedicated toward Kristin, as several authors were invited to reflect on the aftermath of Kristin.

=== Spain ===
The regional government of Andalusia declared Kristin, alongside with other storms of the 2025–26 European windstorm season, a natural disaster. The People's Party (PP) of Castile and León cancelled an event due to the effects of heavy snowfall in the region. The prime minister, Pedro Sánchez, recommended to avoid non-essential travel on 28 January. In January 2026, multiple municipalities requested a declaration of a disaster zone.

== See also ==
- 1941 cyclone
- Cyclone Lothar
- Hurricane Leslie (2018), another cyclone that severely affected the Coimbra district in 2018.
- Storm Goretti, another sting jet cyclone that affected the British Isles and northern France 3 weeks prior to Kristin.
