= 1941 Iberia cyclone =

1941 European windstorm in Southwestern Europe

Meteorological history
- Formed: 14 February 1941
- Dissipated: 16 February 1941

Extratropical cyclone
- Highest gusts: 112 mph (50 m/s; 97 kn; 180 km/h) in San Sebastián, Spain.
- Lowest pressure: 938.5 hPa (703.9 mmHg; 27.71 inHg)

Overall effects
- Fatalities: 130
- Damage: >$49.5 million (1941) €5 billion (2026 estimate)
- Areas affected: Portugal, Spain

The 1941 Iberia cyclone, also known as Cyclone 41, was a deadly and catastrophic extratropical cyclone that affected Portugal and Spain severely in 1941.

The cyclone made landfall in Portugal on 15 February 1941 with gusts up to 169 km/h in Porto, 133 km/h in Coimbra, and 129 km/h in Lisbon. After passing through Portugal, the cyclone caused severe damage in Spain as well with recorded gusts up to 180 km/h. The 1941 cyclone was described as one of the most severe European windstorms of the 20th century. Until Storm Kristin, the 1941 cyclone was described as the biggest catastrophe of the past 200 years in the Iberian Peninsula. The 1941 cyclone was the deadliest cyclone in Portuguese history with 110 deaths. In Spain, an additional 20 people died, bringing the total amount of fatalities to 130. Updating to the present day, the cyclone is estimated to have caused around €5 billion in damage, making the 1941 cyclone the second-most damaging cyclone in Portuguese history.

== Impact ==
=== Portugal ===
Tens of millions of trees fell in the whole country. Entire forests in Caminha and Esposende were destroyed. 40,000 trees were lost in Gaia and 300,000 trees fell in Proença a Nova. 30,000 trees were blown down in Évora. The cyclone caused at least 110 deaths in Portugal, 33 of them died due to a storm surge. The damage caused by the 1941 cyclone was estimated to be half of the national budget for 1941. A factory was destroyed in Guimarães. Hundreds of chimneys were blown down in the Leiria district. A theater in Bombarral was severely affected by the cyclone. Hangars in Espinho and Sintra were damaged. Telephone and telegraph communications were disrupted by the cyclone. Waves reached over 20 metres, which caused ships to sink. Streets in Peniche were flooded. The electricity network of Portugal was severely affected, which interrupted the supply of energy for several days. Many roads were impassible due to fallen trees. Roofs were blown off homes in Lisbon. 200,000 trees fell in the Abrantes region. The Portuguese infrastructure was severely affected by the cyclone. Many buildings in the Coimbra district were unroofed. Hundreds of families were displaced in the municipality of Setúbal. The cyclone caused a significant economic impact in Portugal. 375,000 trees were damaged in Nisa. Many roofs in Fátima were damaged. Over 300,000 trees in the Pinhal de Leiria forest were affected by the cyclone. Several hundreds of people were injured. Marinha Grande and Pinhal do Rei were affected severely by the 1941 cyclone. 230,000 trees in the municipality of Coimbra were affected. 19 homes were damaged in Antuzede and 115 residents in Botão suffered damage to their homes. All houses in the Almalaguês and Assafarge parishes reported damage to their roofs. Thousands of people were displaced in Portugal by powerful winds and floodings.

== See also ==
- Storm Kristin
- Hurricane Leslie (2018)
