= Bajouca =

- Civil parish
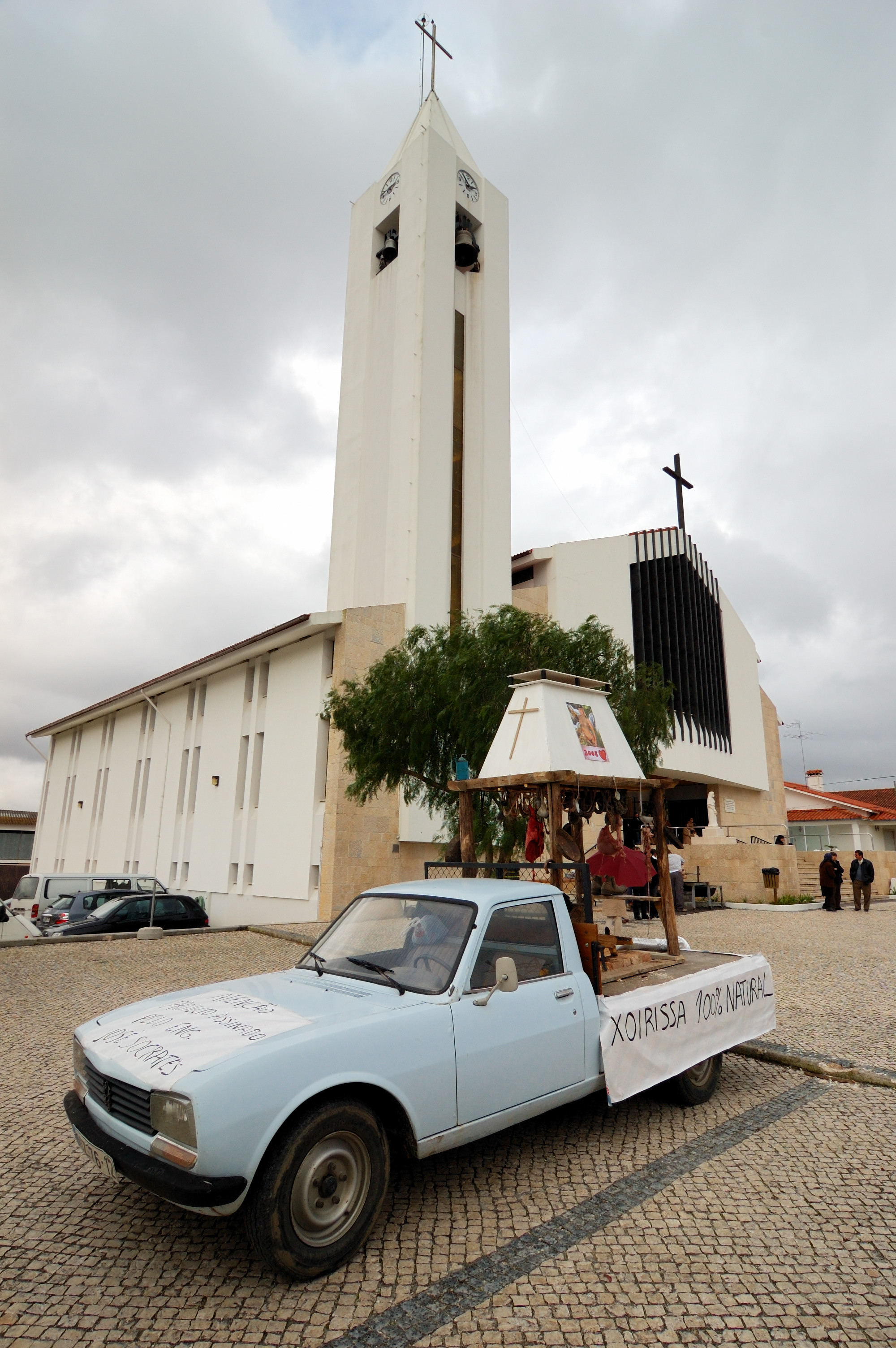

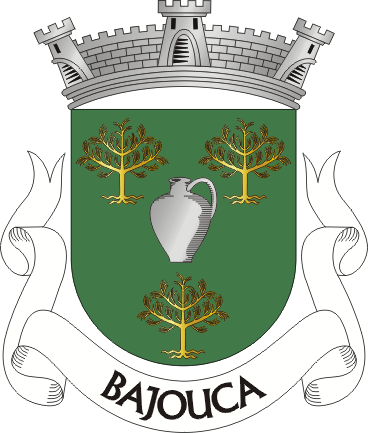
- Coat of arms

- Location in Portugal
- Coordinates: 39°52′47″N 8°47′5″W
- Country: Portugal
- Region: Centro
- Intermunic. comm.: Região de Leiria
- District: Leiria
- Municipality: Leiria

Area
  - Total: 13.21 km^{2} (5.10 sq mi)
- Elevation: 143 m (469 ft)

Population (2011)
  - Total: 2,004
  - Density: 151.7/km^{2} (392.9/sq mi)
- Time zone: UTC+00:00 (WET)
  - Summer (DST): UTC+01:00 (WEST)
- Postal code: 2425
- Patron: Santo Aleixo

Bajouca is a village and a civil parish of the municipality of Leiria, Portugal. The population in 2011 was 2,004, in an area of 13.21 km^{2}.

On 28 January 2026, Storm Kristin caused a catastrophic impact in the Bajouca parish with most homes being damaged, some destroyed homes, long-term power and communication outages, and impassable roads.
