= Amor ao Centro =

Benefit concert for the victims of Storm Kristin

- Genre: Benefit concert
- Dates: 12 February 2026
- Locations: Casa Capitão, Lisbon, Portugal.
- Founders: Alberto Hernández

Amor ao Centro (English: Love at the Centre) was a benefit concert that took place at Casa Capitão in Lisbon on 12 February 2026. The show lasted six hours.

The concert was held in response to Storm Kristin, which devastated central Portugal on 28 January 2026 and was described as the biggest disaster in the contemporary history of Portugal. Kristin caused estimated losses of €6 billion in the central region of Portugal.

Iolanda Costa, the Portuguese participant of the Eurovision Song Contest 2024, took part in the charity event, alongside with several other Portuguese artists including Ana Mariano.

== Fundraising ==
The tickets for the concert were prized €20 each and were available on the DICE platform. Within a week, the concert was held, and all tickets were sold out, raising over €7,000. Including the money raised by the online campaign, the total amount of money raised by Amor ao Centro was €18,707.
