= Ana Mariano =

Portuguese singer-songwriter

- Born: Ana Mariano; 9 June 1997; Lisbon, Portugal
- Genre: Contemporary folk,Folk-pop, Pop
- Years active: 2020 until present

Ana Mariano (born 9 June 1997) is Portuguese singer, composer, guitarist and live performer. She writes lyrics and sings in both Portuguese and English. Her first single “Ordinary View” was included on the “Novos Talentos FNAC 2019” (New Talents of FNAC 2019) compilation. She has since released two EPs and a full-length album.

She has been described by Mega Hits FM (Portugal) as, a mesmerizing performer with a contagious voice and unmistakable talent. And has sold out important venues such as the MEO Sons do Mar festival in Madeira Island.

== Early years ==
Ana Mariano was born and raised in Aveiro, a small coastal city in Northern Portugal. The artist is currently based in Lisbon.

Mariano started playing the electric guitar when she was eleven. At age about age fifteen, inspired by hip hop artists such as Dillaz, she begin involving herself more with writing lyrics and singing over beats. At about the same time, she gave up the electric guitar altogether and switched to the acoustic guitar. The merging of poetic lyricism and traditional instrumentalism led the way to Ana Mariano's transformation to the contemporary folk artist she has evolved into.

== Releases ==
=== Everything I Touch ===
In late 2019, Ana Mariano released Everything I Touch, (her debut five-song e.p.). The first single from the record “Ordinary View” was selected as a Jury’s Choice entry for “Novos Talentos FNAC 2019” (New Talents of FNAC 2019), a CD compilation backed by French multinational media chain FNAC.

The artist has said of this release, "The lyrics and the melodies are a mirror of what surrounds me, inspired not only by my own experiences but also by constantly feeling my skin connected to the world."

=== Nuvem (Cloud) ===
Unlike her debut EP Everything I Touch, which was largely in English, Nuvem (a nine-song studio album produced by João Só and Luar) was written and recorded entirely in her native language in Portuguese. The album features more than 40 guests, including Jéssica Silva, João Só and Iolanda. The record also includes two duets; Nem Sempre o Amor (with SPA Award nominee Bia Maria) and “Recomeço” with Latin Grammy Award nominee, Janeiro.

Portugal's Blitz Magazine describes the song, “Recomeço” as, a pop song inspired by folk and organic sounds, which brings a new perspective on endings and beginnings.

=== Outras Vias de Aproximação (Other Approach Routes) ===
In 2025, Ana Mariano released the four-song e.p, Outras Vias de Aproximação (or Other Approach Routes). The record, entirely produced by the artist, presented two new songs; the folk-pop tune Enquanto Voas (II) (While You Fly (II)) and No Calendário (On the Calendar). There were also two interpretations of songs from her previous 2024 album, Nuvem including Afinar (Outros) Silêncios (Tuning (Other) Silences), inspired by the literary character Mwuanito, from Mia Couto's 2009 novel Jesusalém, The song features collaborations with pianist Inês Apenas and guitarist producer Malva. With this new work, Ana Mariano continues the folk-pop and emotional aesthetic she began with "Nuvem," reinforcing her artistic identity as a composer and producer.

The song No Calendário was accompanied by a time-lapse music video directed by photographer and cinematographer Guilherme Cabral, based on a concept developed with Ana Mariano and graphic designer Prod Peter. “The goal was to depict the passage of time evoked by the song—the idea of days accumulating, leaving their mark, and transforming us, explained Mariano to Público Newspaper.

== Radio play ==
Ana Mariano songs have been included on the playlist of Portugal's largest broadcast radio stations RTP Antena 3, Super Bock Super Rock e Vodafone FM.

== Live performances ==
Ana Mariano has performed at large scale events throughout Portugal including Kalorama Music Festival, MEO Sons do Mar in Funchal, Madeira, Lisbon's Super Bock em Stock and the Festas do Mar (Sea Festival) in Cascais.

=== Storm Kristin benefit concert ===
In reaction to the early 2026 Effects of Storm Kristin in Portugal, multiple Portuguese artists, such as Iolanda, Ana Lua Caiano, Ana Mariano, and Marisa Liz, came together in Lisbon on February 11th for a benefit concert in support of the victims of the natural disaster. The eventraised €18,707 in total. All tickets were sold out for the Amor ao Centro benefit concert in Lisbon.

== Discography ==
- 2020 Everything I Touch
1. Intro (If You Could Only See Me)
2. Insomnia
3. Plastic Wings
4. Ordinary View
5. No More Us
- 2024 Nuvem(Cloud)
1. Esse Teu Riso
2. Deixa o Sol Entrar
3. Senhor Pintor
4. Histórias
5. Girassóis à Beira-Mar
6. Nem Sempre o Amor (with Bia Maria)
7. Enquanto Voas
8. Recomeço (with Janeiro)
9. Afinar Silêncios
- 2025 Outras Vias de Aproximação (Other Approach Routes)
1. Calendário
2. Afinar (Outros) Silêncios
3. Enquanto Voas
4. Mais Um Dia No Calendário

== Music publishing ==
Ana Mariano's songs are published by Sociedade Portuguesa de Autores (Portuguese Society of Authors).
