= 2021–22 European windstorm season =

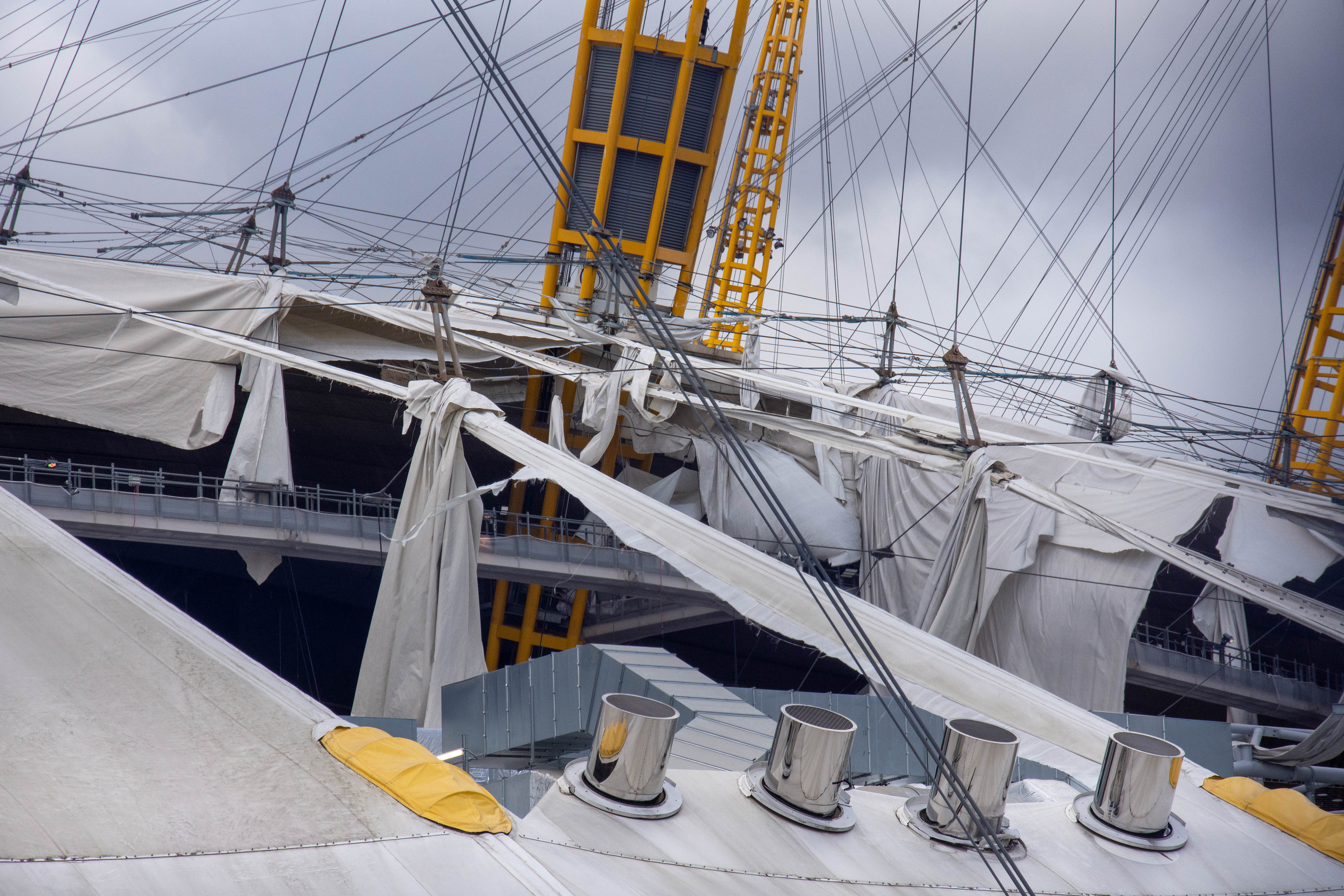
- Damage to The O2 Arena's tent caused by Storm Eunice
- First storm formed: 23 September 2021
- Last storm dissipated: 20 August 2022
- Strongest storm^{1}: Franklin; 952 hPa (28.1 inHg)
- Strongest wind gust: Malik; 236 km/h (147 mph)
- Total storms: 23
- Total damage: >€3.63 billion ($3.90 billion) / (£3.06 billion)
- Total fatalities: 73 dead, 25 injured, 3 missing
- ^{1}Strongest storm is determined by lowest pressure and maximum recorded non-mountainous wind gust is also included for reference.

The 2021–22 European windstorm season was the seventh instance of seasonal European windstorm naming in Europe. This was the third season in which the Netherlands participated, alongside the meteorological agencies of Ireland and the United Kingdom (Western group). It comprised a year from 1 September to 31 August, except in the Eastern Mediterranean Group which is shifted a month later. The Portuguese, Spanish, French and Belgian meteorological agencies collaborated again, for the fifth time, joined by the Luxembourg meteorological agency (South-western group). This was the first season when Greece, Israel and Cyprus (Eastern Mediterranean group), and Italy, Slovenia, Croatia, Montenegro, North Macedonia and Malta (Central Mediterranean group) named storms which affected their areas.

== Background and naming ==
In 2015, the Met Office and Met Éireann announced a pilot project to name storm warnings as part of the "Name our Storms" project for wind storms and asked the public for suggestions. The meteorological offices produced a full list of names for 2015–2016 through to 2017–2018, common to both the United Kingdom and Ireland, with the Netherlands taking part from 2019 onwards. Names in the United Kingdom will be based on the National Severe Weather Warning Service, when a storm is assessed to have the potential for an Amber ('be prepared') or Red ('take action (danger to life)') warning.

There are multiple regional naming lists: one created by the national meteorological agencies of the United Kingdom, Ireland, and the Netherlands, another created by the equivalent agencies from France, Spain, Portugal, Belgium and Luxembourg. This season saw the addition of two groups in southern and south eastern Europe, grouped along the Mediterranean. As in previous years, former Atlantic hurricanes retained their names as assigned by the National Hurricane Center of the United States.

From the autumn of 2021, the names issued by other meteorological services were included on the charts of the Berlin Wetterkarte and Free University of Berlin using the prefix "int." under the EUMETNET umbrella.

=== Western Group (United Kingdom, Ireland and the Netherlands) ===
The following names were chosen for the 2021–2022 season in the United Kingdom, Ireland, and the Netherlands.

- Arwen
- Barra
- Corrie
- Dudley
- Eunice
- Franklin
- Gladys (unused)
- Herman (unused)
- Imani (unused)
- Jack (unused)
- Kim (unused)
- Logan (unused)
- Méabh (unused)
- Nasim (unused)
- Olwen (unused)
- Pól (unused)
- Ruby (unused)
- Seán (unused)
- Tineke (unused)
- Vergil (unused)
- Willemien (unused)

=== South-western Group (France, Spain, Portugal, Belgium and Luxembourg) ===
This was the fifth year in which the meteorological agencies of France, Spain and Portugal named storms that affected their areas. The naming scheme partially overlapped that used by the United Kingdom, Ireland and the Netherlands, as storms named by the other group of agencies were used reciprocally.

- Aurore
- Blas
- Celia
- Diego
- Evelyn
- Fabio (unused)
- Georgia (unused)
- Hans (unused)
- Isabel (unused)
- Jean-Louis (unused)
- Konstantina (unused)
- Lucas (unused)
- Marjane (unused)
- Nikolai (unused)
- Odalys (unused)
- Paris (unused)
- Rada (unused)
- Stefano (unused)
- Taimi (unused)
- Vladimir (unused)
- Wallis (unused)

=== Eastern Mediterranean Group (Greece, Israel and Cyprus) ===
This was the first year in which the meteorological agencies of Greece, Israel and Cyprus named storms that affected their areas. The naming scheme partially overlapped that used by the France, Spain, Portugal, Belgium and Luxembourg, as storms named by the other group of agencies were used reciprocally.

- Athina
- Ballos
- Carmel
- Diomedes
- Elpis
- Filippos
- Genesis
- Helios (unused)
- Irit (unused)
- Kalypso (unused)
- Lavi (unused)
- Meliti (unused)
- Nikias (unused)
- Ora (unused)
- Paris (unused)
- Raphael (unused)
- Semeli (unused)
- Thomas (unused)
- Urania (unused)
- Vion (unused)
- Xenios (unused)
- Yasmin (unused)
- Zefyros (unused)

=== Central Mediterranean Group (Italy, Slovenia, Croatia, Montenegro, North Macedonia and Malta) ===
This was the first year in which the meteorological agencies of Italy, Slovenia, Croatia, Montenegro, North Macedonia and Malta named storms or former cyclones that affected their areas. Storms or cyclones named by the other group of agencies were used reciprocally.

- Apollo
- Bianca
- Ciril
- Diana
- Enea (unused)
- Fedra (unused)
- Goran (unused)
- Hera (unused)
- Ivan (unused)
- Lina (unused)
- Marco (unused)
- Nada (unused)
- Ole (unused)
- Pandora (unused)
- Remo (unused)
- Sandra (unused)
- Teodor (unused)
- Ursula (unused)
- Vito (unused)
- Zora (unused)

=== Northern Group (Iceland, Denmark, Norway, Finland and Sweden) ===
The naming strategy for the Northern group (Iceland, Denmark, Norway, Finland and Sweden) is slightly different than the other groups, as names are not announced beforehand to prevent the names being used before a storm formally qualifies. Storms or former cyclones named by the other group of agencies were used reciprocally, unless the names used in other groups were not pronounceable in the local language. However, if a Northern group storm was used to overwrite another storm like Eunice, it was not added to the overall total of storms within the 2021–22 European windstorm season, as they were the same storms with different names. This was the case for storm Eunice, which was named Nora in Denmark (and so the latter name is not listed below).

- Malik

== Season summary ==
EUMETNET groups naming lists by colour

Western group
South-western group
Northern group
Central & southern group
Central Mediterranean group
North-east group
South-east group
Eastern Mediterranean group

All storms named by meteorological organisation in Europe from their respected forecasting areas. As well as Atlantic hurricanes and storms that transitioned into a European windstorm and retained its name as assigned by the National Hurricane Center in Miami, Florida:

== Storms ==
=== Storm Athina (Christian) ===
Storm Athina
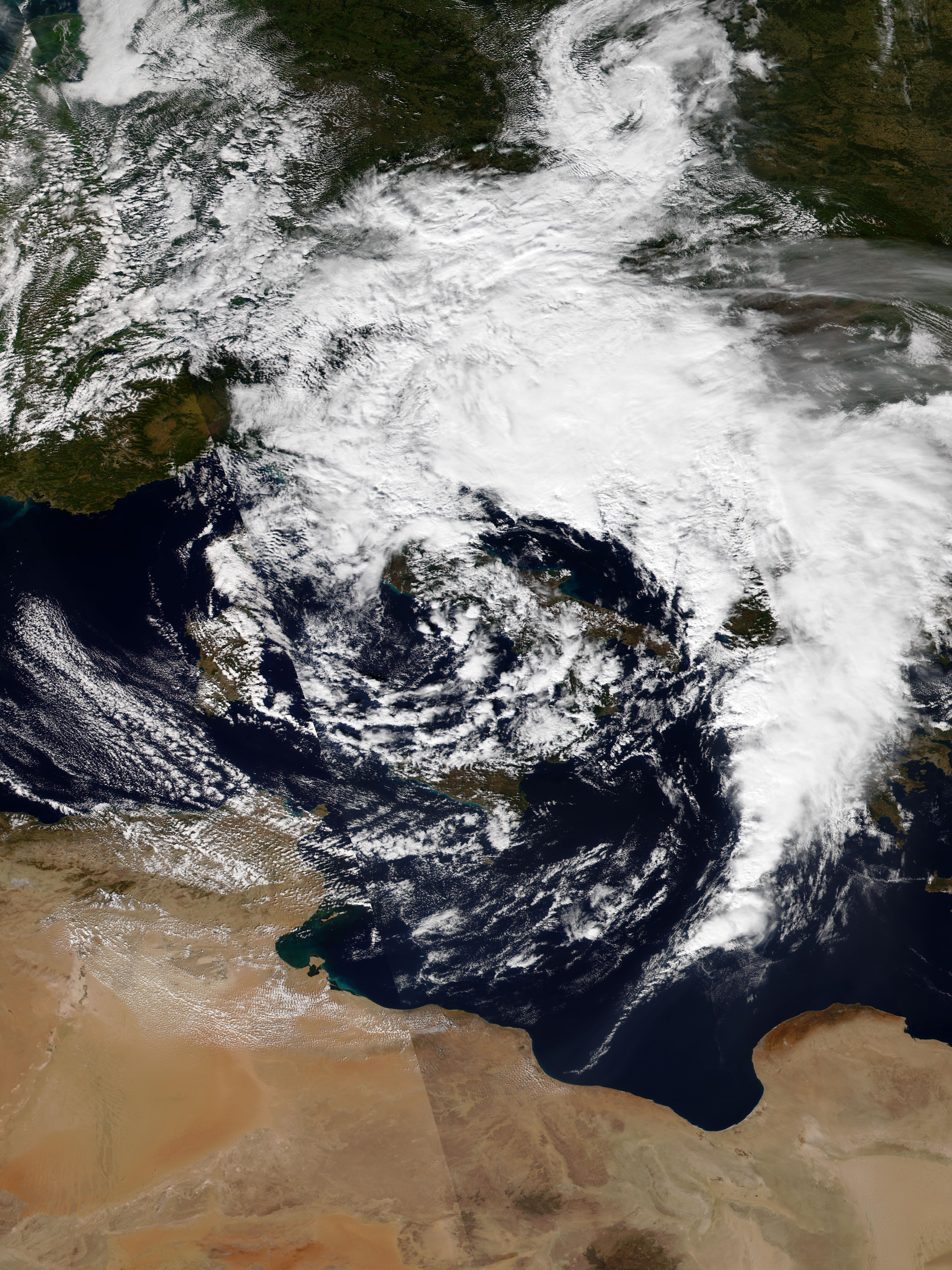

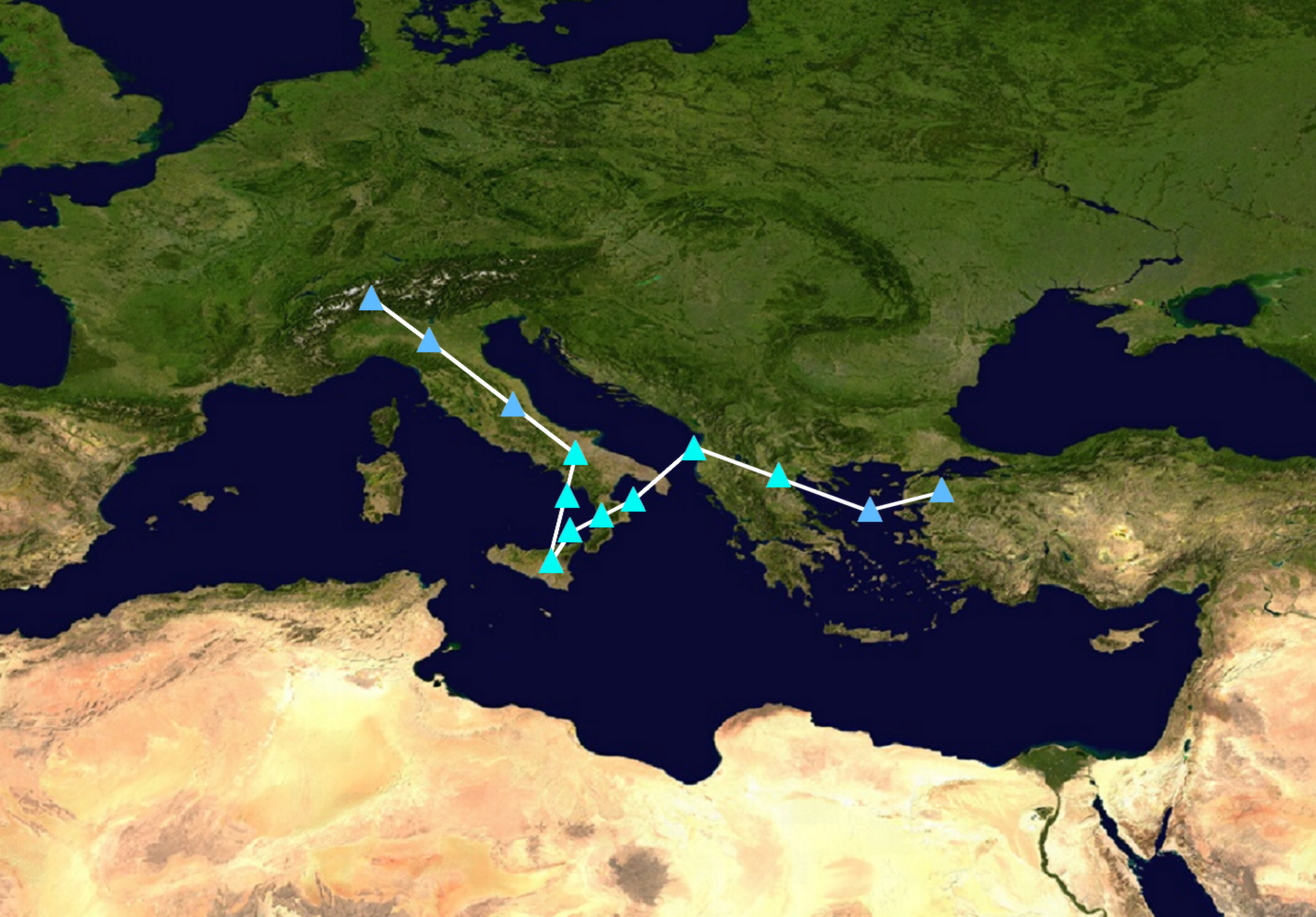
- Area affected: Greece, Italy
- Date of impact: 4–9 October 2021
- Maximum wind gust: Unspecified
- Lowest pressure: 1,006 hPa (29.7 inHg)
- Fatalities: Unspecified
- Power outages: Unspecified
- Damage: Unspecified

A depression formed on 4 October in the western Mediterranean and was named Christian by the Free University of Berlin. It was named Storm Athina by Hellenic National Meteorological Service on 6 October and intensified when it arrived in southern Italy on 8 October. The system then passed into the Ionian Sea before dissipating on the 9th.

In central Italy, Athina caused record rainfall in Liguria with 496 mm in Savona in just 6 hours, breaking the record of 472 mm in November 2011. The main roads of the island of Corfu turned into rivers, the basements were flooded, power outages occurred, small landslides occurred and firefighter interventions were required with the storm front rains preceding the system.

=== Storm Ballos ===
Storm Ballos
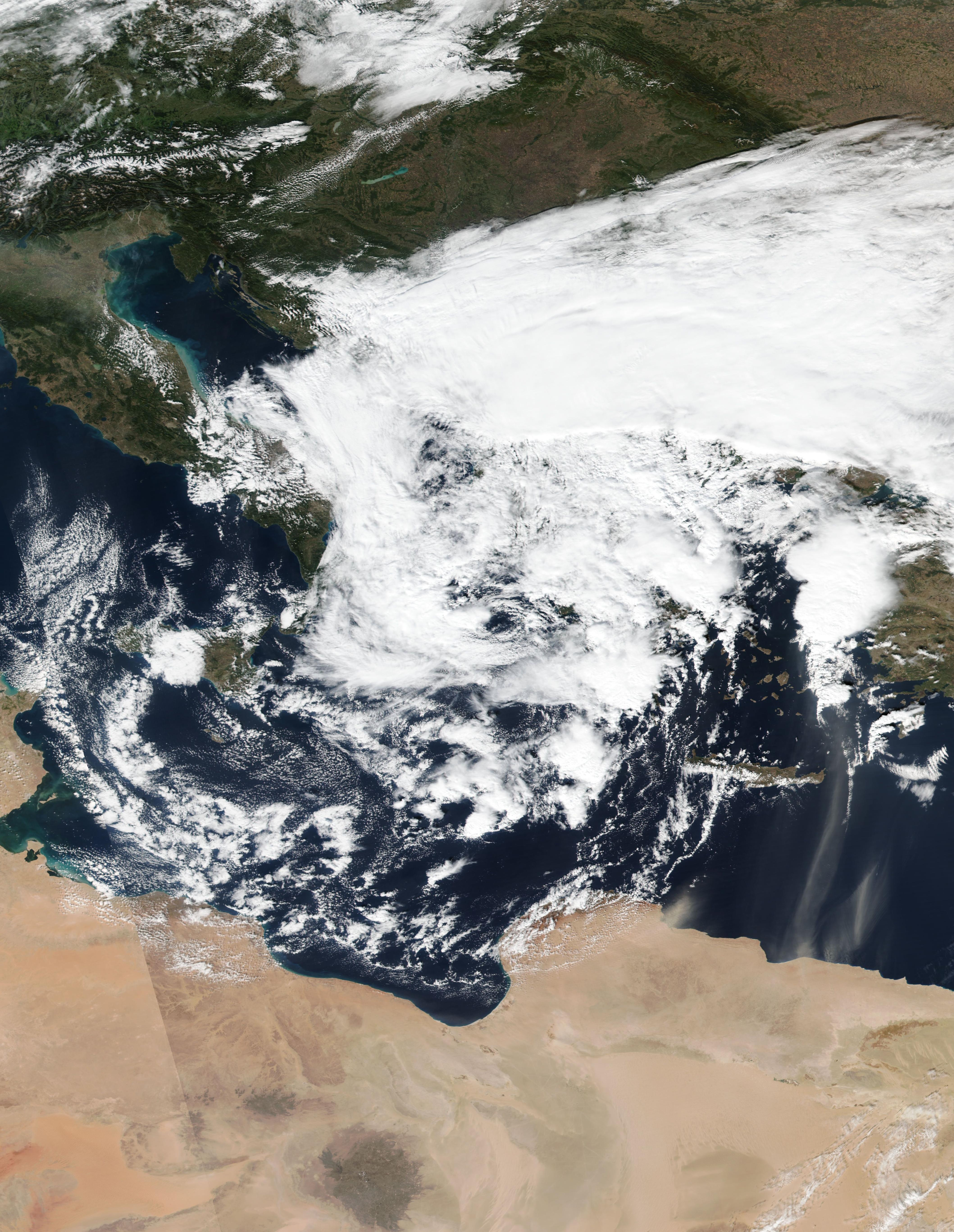
- Ballos as on 15-10-2021

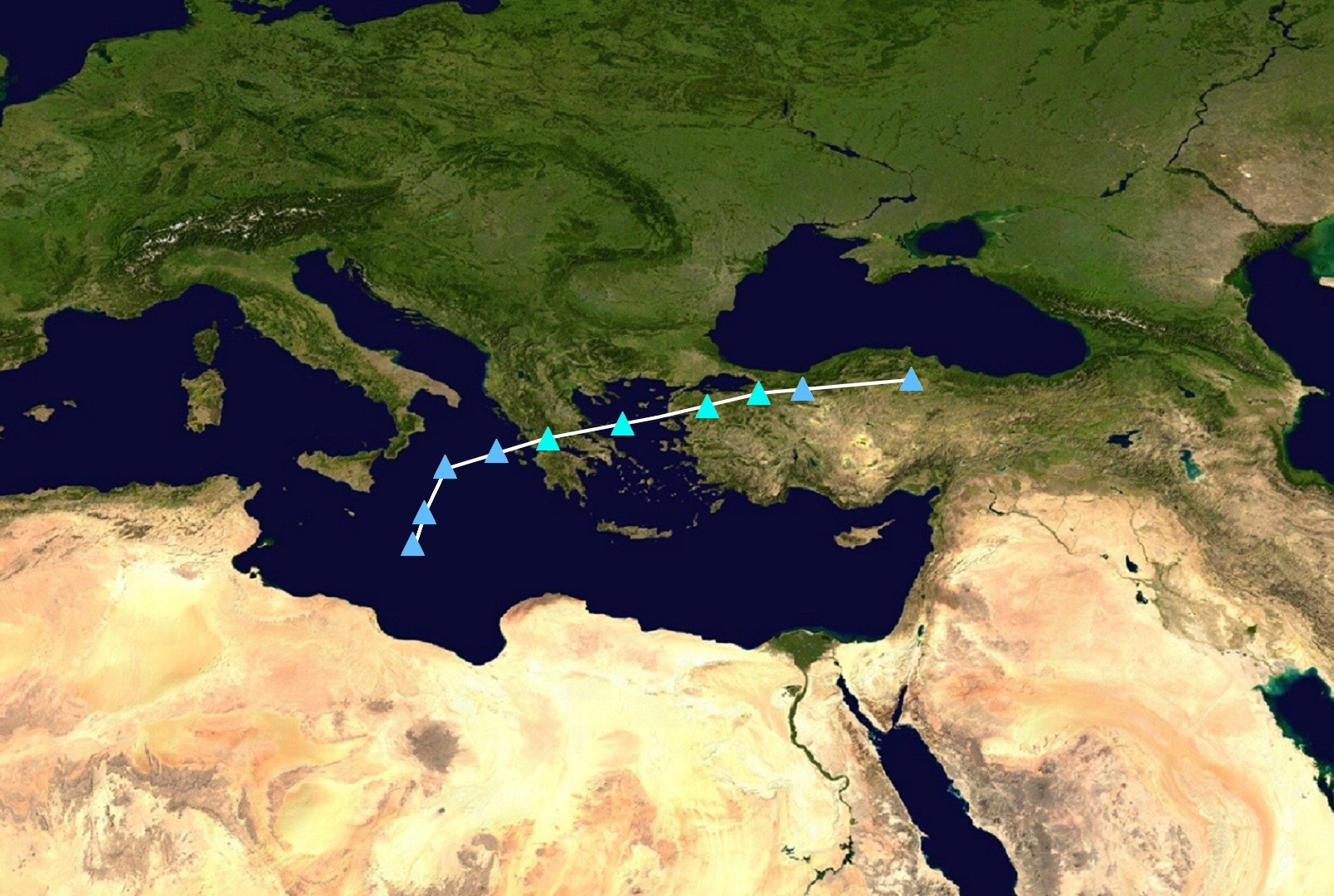
- Area affected: Greece
- Date of impact: 13–16 October 2021
- Maximum wind gust: Unspecified
- Lowest pressure: 1,005 hPa (29.7 inHg)
- Fatalities: 2 total
- Power outages: Unspecified
- Damage: A balcony collapsed in the Athens suburb of Halandri.

Storm Ballos was named by Hellenic National Meteorological Service on 13 October, heavy rain and floods in Athens on 15 October and some of the islands have been reported. Heavy rain was predicted for 15 October in Eastern Macedonia and Thrace and a red alert with heavy rain and severe thunderstorms in North Aegean islands (meteoalarm).

=== Storm Aurore (Hendrik) ===
Storm Aurore
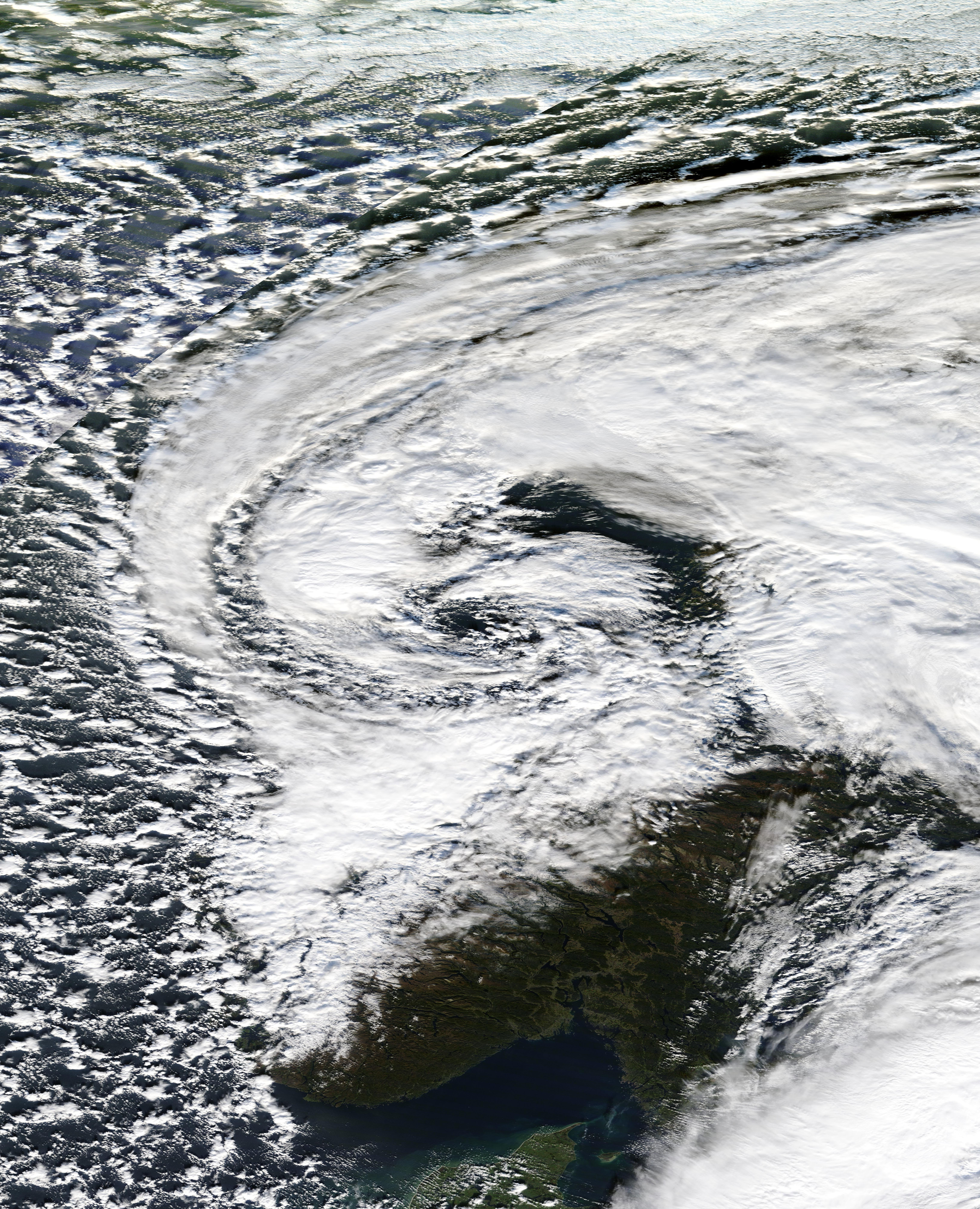
- Storm Aurore North of Scandinavia on 23 October

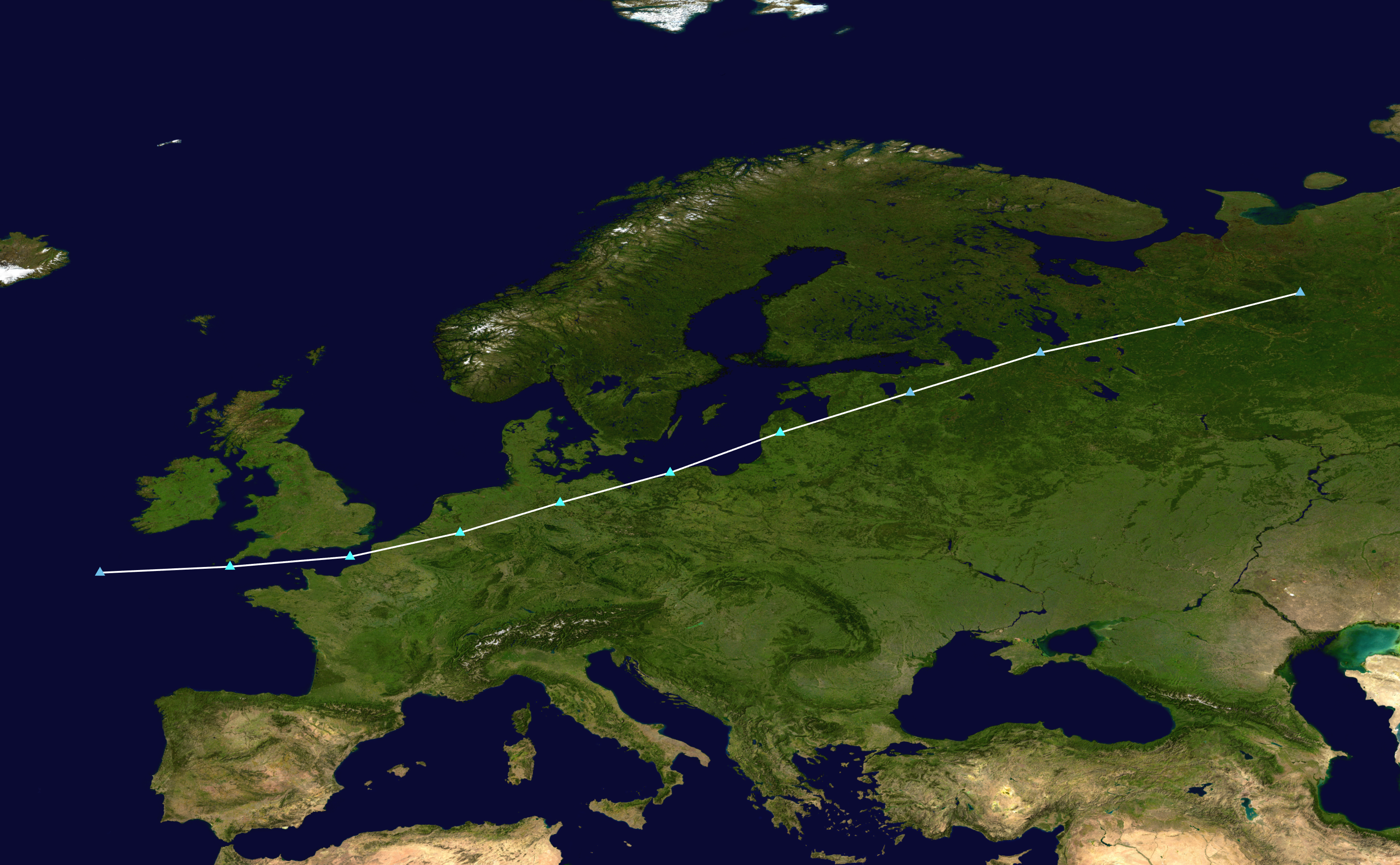
- Area affected: UK, France, Czech Republic, Poland, Netherlands, Germany, Denmark, and Russia
- Date of impact: 20–23 October 2021
- Maximum wind gust: Winds of over 175 km/h (109 mph; 94 kn) were reported in France
- Lowest pressure: 970 hPa (29 inHg)
- Fatalities: 6
- Power outages: >525,000
- Damage: Heavy rain and strong gusty winds above 128 km/h (80 mph; 69 kn) in the Channel Islands.

A storm, named Hendrik by the Free University of Berlin on 16 October, developed over the northern Atlantic Ocean. Another developing low south of Ireland was called Aurore by Meteo France on 20 October. Passing over the south of England the following night, Aurore generated very strong south-westerly winds and heavy rains from Brittany to the Grand Est in France, then central Europe as it merged with Hendrik over western Europe. An orange alert for wind was issued by meteorological services in western Europe, and even red for parts of southern and eastern Germany. The system reached northern Russia on 22 October and dissipated in northern Siberia the next day.

Aurore/Hendrik brought widespread gusts of 100 to 120 km/h (62 to 75 mph; 54 to 65 kn) from northern France to eastern Germany and beyond, reaching speeds of 175 km/h (109 mph; 94 kn; 49 m/s) in Fécamp in Normandy. Fallen trees disrupted train service in several countries. Two tornadoes touched down in the Netherlands, in Brittany (France), three possible tornadoes were reported in Plozévet, Riec-sur-Belon and Kernascléden. and in Germany, another tornado touched down near Kiel.

Four people were killed in Poland. One death was reported in Germany. and another in the United Kingdom. Around 250,000 clients lost electricity in France and 275,000 in the Czech Republic.

=== Cyclone Apollo ===
Cyclone Apollo
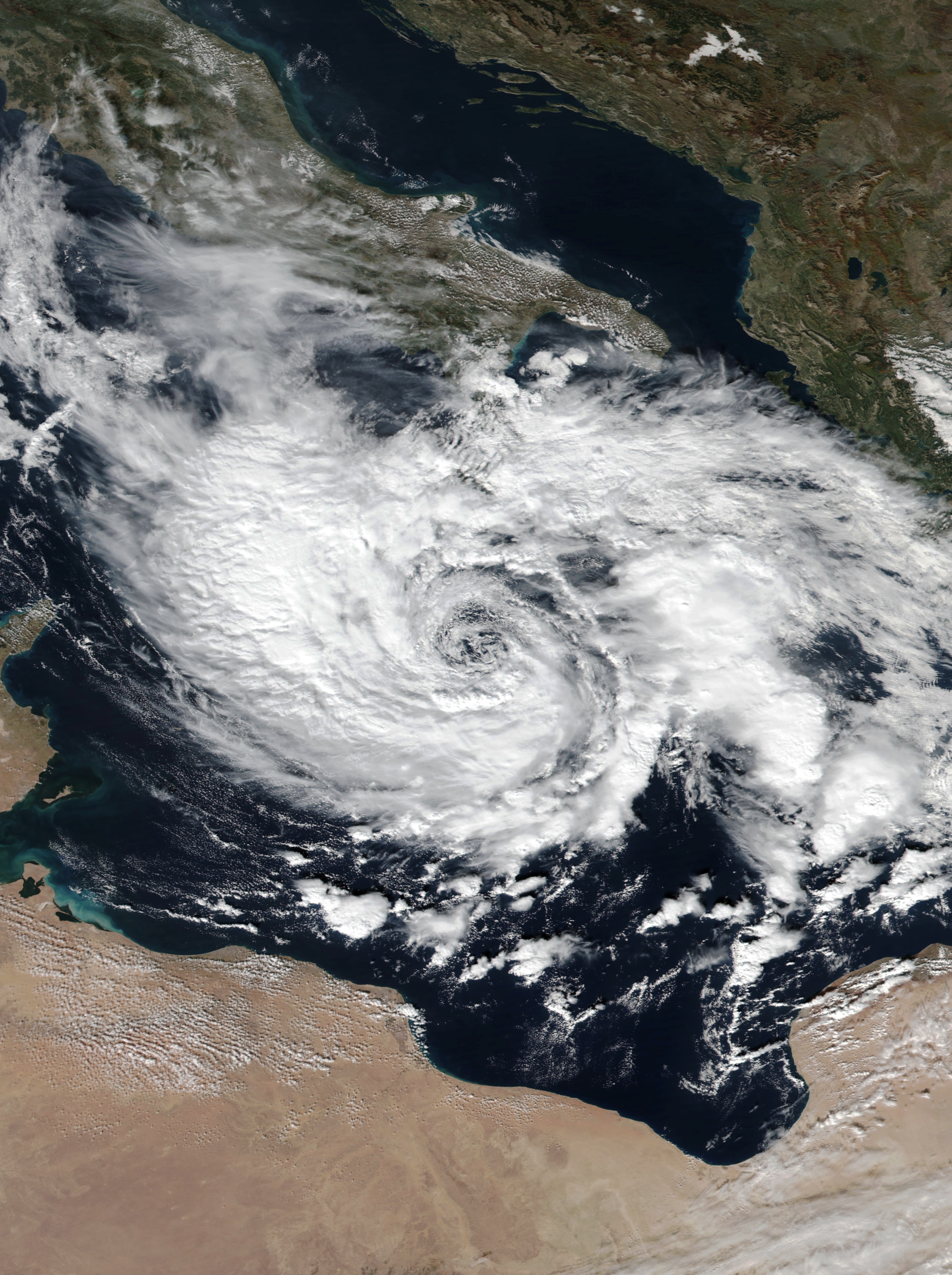
- Cyclone Apollo off the eastern coast of Sicily on 29 October.

- Area affected: Italy, Tunisia, Algeria, Malta, Libya and Turkey
- Date of impact: 24 October – 2 November 2021
- Maximum wind gust: 103 km/h (64 mph; 56 kn)
- Lowest pressure: 994.4 hPa (29.36 inHg)
- Fatalities: 6 Dead, 2 Missing
- Power outages: Unspecified
- Damage: Unspecified

Cyclone Apollo was a Mediterranean tropical-like cyclone that affected many countries on the Mediterranean coast, especially Italy and Libya. The storm killed at least 5 people and left 2 others missing due to flooding from the cyclone, in the countries of Tunisia, Algeria, Malta, and Italy, where the worst of the effects have been felt, especially on the island of Sicily. Around 22 October 2021, an area of organized thunderstorms formed near the Balearic Islands, with the disturbance becoming more organized and developing an area of low pressure around 24 October. On the next day, the low started to develop a low-level circulation center, and moved into the Tyrrhenian Sea. On 28 October, the system organized even further and intensified, which prompted forecast offices in Europe to name the low. Italy's Servizio Meteorologico named the storm Apollo (which was then adopted by the Free University of Berlin). On 29 October 2021, a ship in the Mediterranean Sea passed through Apollo and measured a peak wind speed of 104 km/h (29 m/s; 56 kn) and a pressure of 999.4 hPa (29.51 inHg), indicating that Apollo is still strengthening. After Apollo made its closest approach to Sicily during the overnight hours of 29 October, Apollo appeared to have begun to weaken as its convection waned and its low-level circulation became exposed on visible satellite imagery on 30 October 2021, on 31 October 2021, Apollo made landfall near Bayda and stayed inland until emerging over the Mediterranean a few hours later. Then, on 2 November, it dissipated off the coast of Turkey.

Heavy rain from the cyclone and its precursor caused heavy rainfall and flooding in Tunisia, Algeria, Southern Italy, and Malta, killing 5 people and leaving 2 other people missing. The flooding was especially severe in the provinces of Catania and Siracusa, in Eastern Sicily.

=== Storm Blas ===
Storm Blas
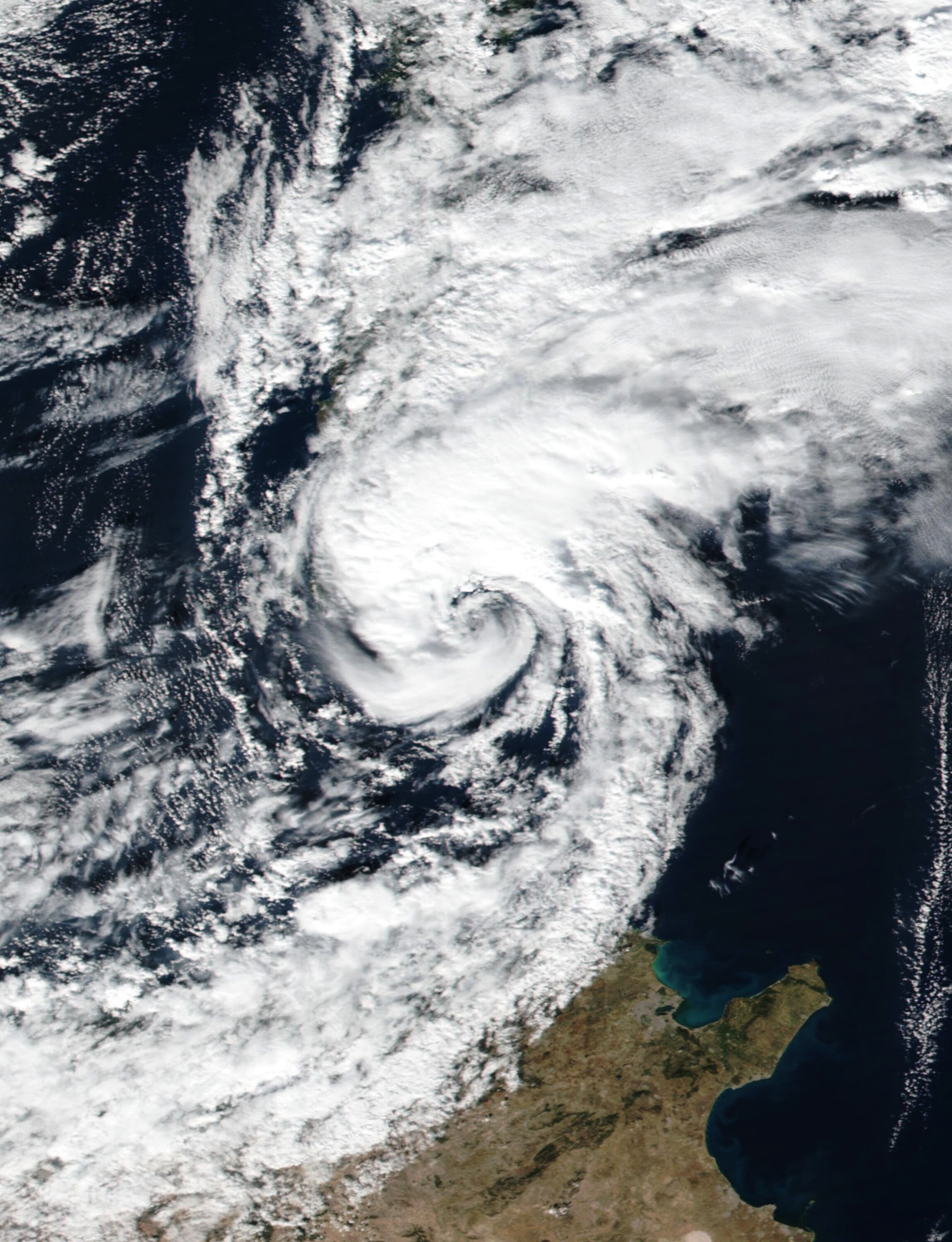
- Blas impacting Sardinia on 14 November.

- Area affected: Algeria, Balearic Islands and East coast of Spain, South of France, Morocco, Sardinia, Sicily
- Date of impact: 5–18 November 2021
- Maximum wind gust: 140 km/h (87 mph; 76 kn)
- Lowest pressure: 1,010 hPa (30 inHg)
- Fatalities: 9
- Power outages: Unspecified
- Damage: Unspecified

On 5 November, the Spanish Meteorological Agency (AEMET) started tracking a low near the Balearic Islands and named it Blas. An orange alert was issued for these islands, for coastal phenomena and rain. The north of Catalonia was declared an Orange Zone, as strong winds blew inland from the Spanish Navarre and Aragon. Météo-France has also issued a yellow alert for Aude and Pyrénées-Orientales for wind, as well as Corsica for rain.

As the system stalled between Sardinia and the Balearic Islands on 8 November, AEMET predicted a strengthening for the next two days and maintained its alerts. At 00:00 UTC on 11 November, the system was again very close to the Balearic Islands. After striking the islands again, the storm then slowly weakened while drifting back towards the southeast. On 14 November, the cyclone turned northward, moving over Sardinia and Corsica, before curving back southwest on 15 November and moving over Sardinia again, while strengthening in the process. On 16 November, Blas turned eastward once again, passing just south of Sardinia and moving towards Italy, before dissipating over the Tyrrhenian Sea on 18 November.

On 6 November, gusts of 75 km/h (21 m/s; 40 kn) were recorded at Es Mercadal and 95 km/h (26 m/s; 51 kn) at the lighthouse of Capdepera in the Balearic Islands where waves of 8 m (26 ft) hit the coast. Menorca was cut off from the world after the closure of the ports of Mahón and Ciutadella. On 9 and 10 November, Blas again brought high winds and heavy rain to the Balearic Islands, causing at least 36 incidents, mostly flooding, landslides and blackouts. A crew member had to be rescued after his sailboat's mast broke, leaving the boat adrift 80 km (43 nmi) west of Soller.

On 6 November, a waterspout was reported in Melilla, a Spanish enclave on the coast of Morocco. In France, gusts of 140 km/h (39 m/s; 76 kn) were noted on 7 November at Cap Béar, as well as 111 km/h (31 m/s; 60 kn) in Leucate and 100 km/h (28 m/s; 54 kn) in Lézignan-Corbières.

The storm caused severe weather on the Algerian coast with exceptional rainfall. On 9 November, a building collapsed in Algiers following torrential rains on the city, causing the deaths of three people. On 11 November, the heavy rain continuing on Algiers caused another landslide on houses in the Raïs Hamidou neighborhood, causing the deaths of three other persons.

From 8 to 11 November, convective bands associated with the storm caused 3 deaths in Sicily.

=== Storm Arwen ===
Storm Arwen
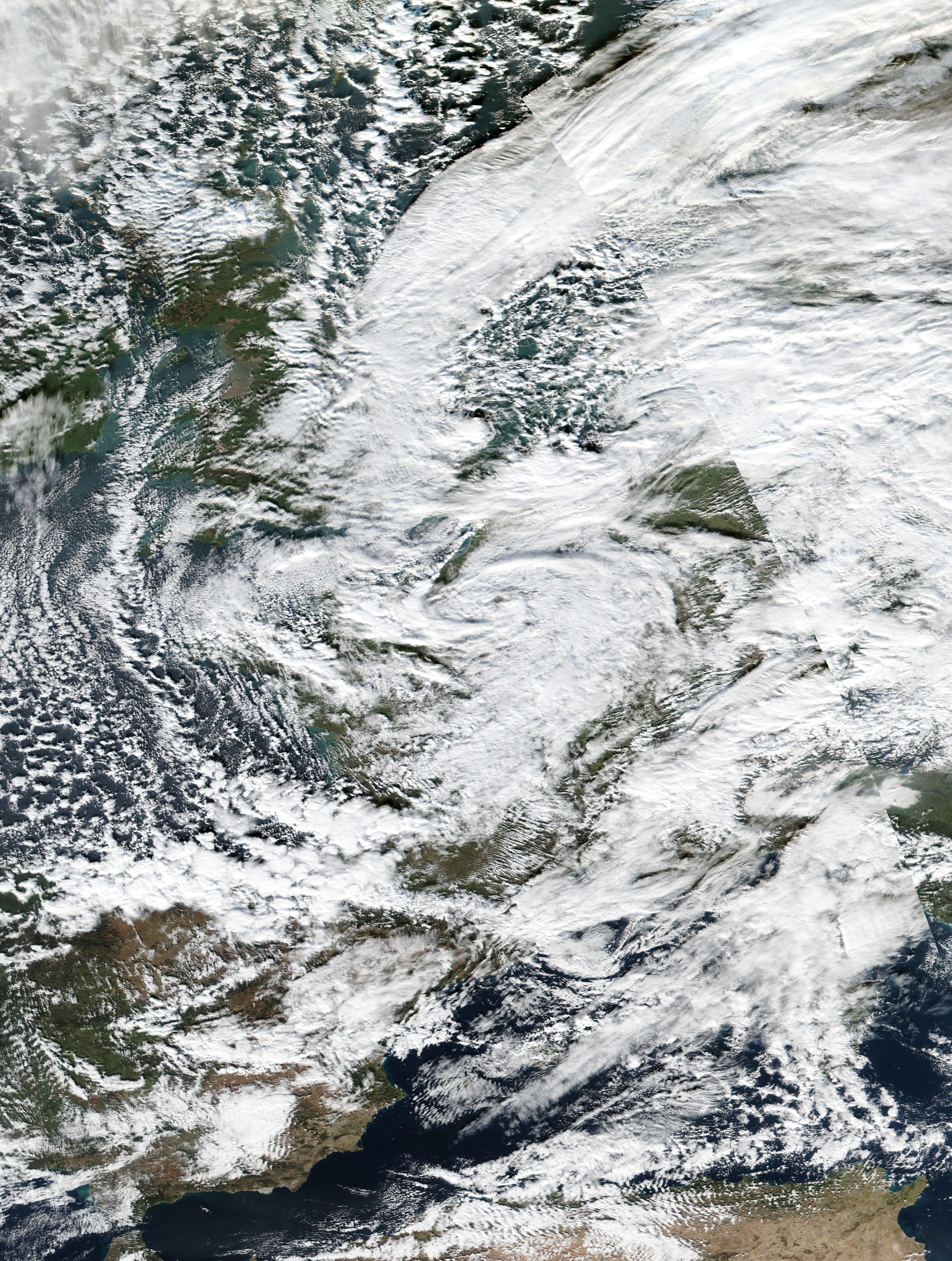

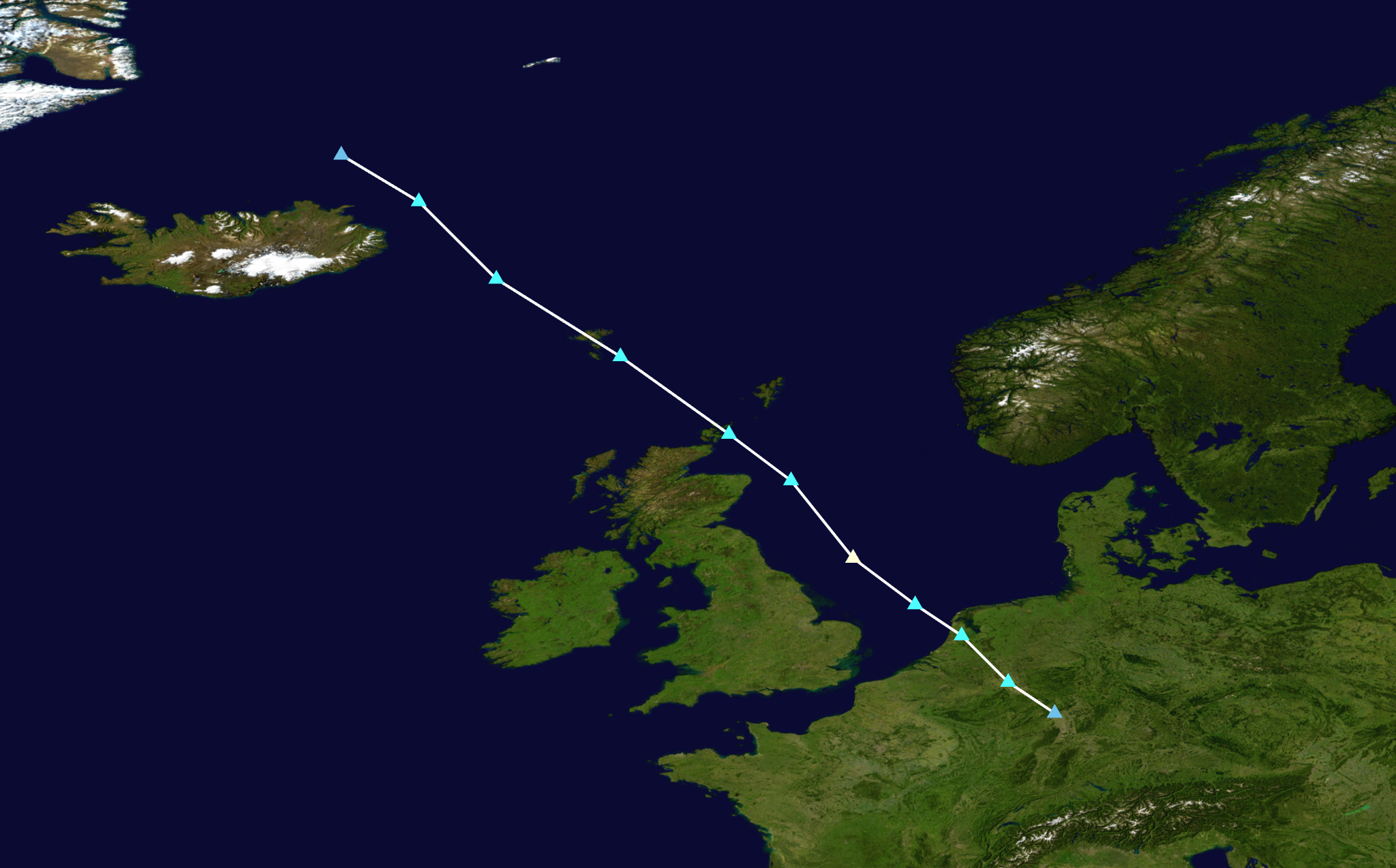
- Area affected: UK, Ireland, France, Norway, Germany, Denmark, Sweden, Belgium, Netherlands, Northern Spain
- Date of impact: 25–27 November 2021
- Maximum wind gust: 177 km/h (110 mph; 96 kn)
- Lowest pressure: 973 hPa (28.7 inHg)
- Fatalities: 3 direct, 1 indirect
- Power outages: 225,000
- Damage: Structural damage and overturned lorries, loss of power in UK and France.

Storm Arwen was named by the Met Office on 25 November 2021. Red warnings for wind were issued for north-eastern parts of the UK, as well as extensive amber and yellow warnings for much of Scotland, Northern Ireland, Wales and most of England. Dangerous waves were also forecasted causing disruption to ferry services. At 17:00 UTC on 26 November, Network Rail closed the rail lines north of Berwick-upon-Tweed and LNER stopped running trains north of Newcastle. More than 120 lorries were stuck in heavy snow on the M62 in Greater Manchester, with the motorway shut by police while ploughs and gritters led the rescue effort. The storm closed the entire Tyne and Wear Metro network which said in statement "this is the worst winter storm to hit metro in 41 years of operations".

Dozens of crashes were reported by police agencies across the UK, many roads were closed due to fallen trees, snow or ice, and more than 130,000 homes were without power on a cold night in the north.

A man in the Northern Irish town of Antrim died when a falling tree hit his car. Another man was hit and killed by a falling tree in Cumbria and a third man died after his pick-up truck was struck by a falling tree in Aberdeenshire.

The live broadcasts and filming of I'm a Celebrity...Get Me Out of Here! on 26, 27 and 28 November at Gwrych Castle in Wales were affected as a result of the storm.

=== Storm Barra (Harry) ===
Storm Barra
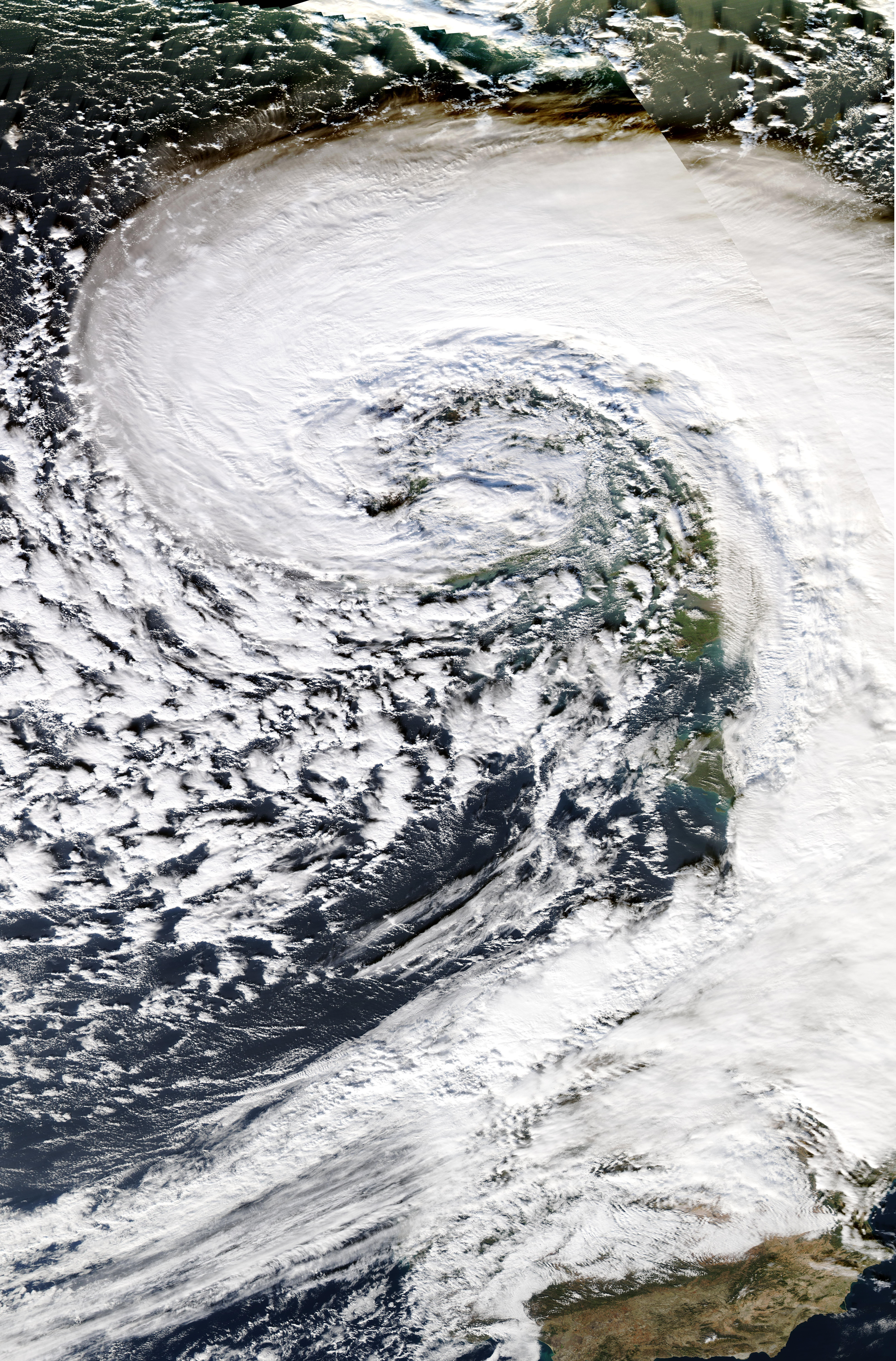
- Barra on 7 December.

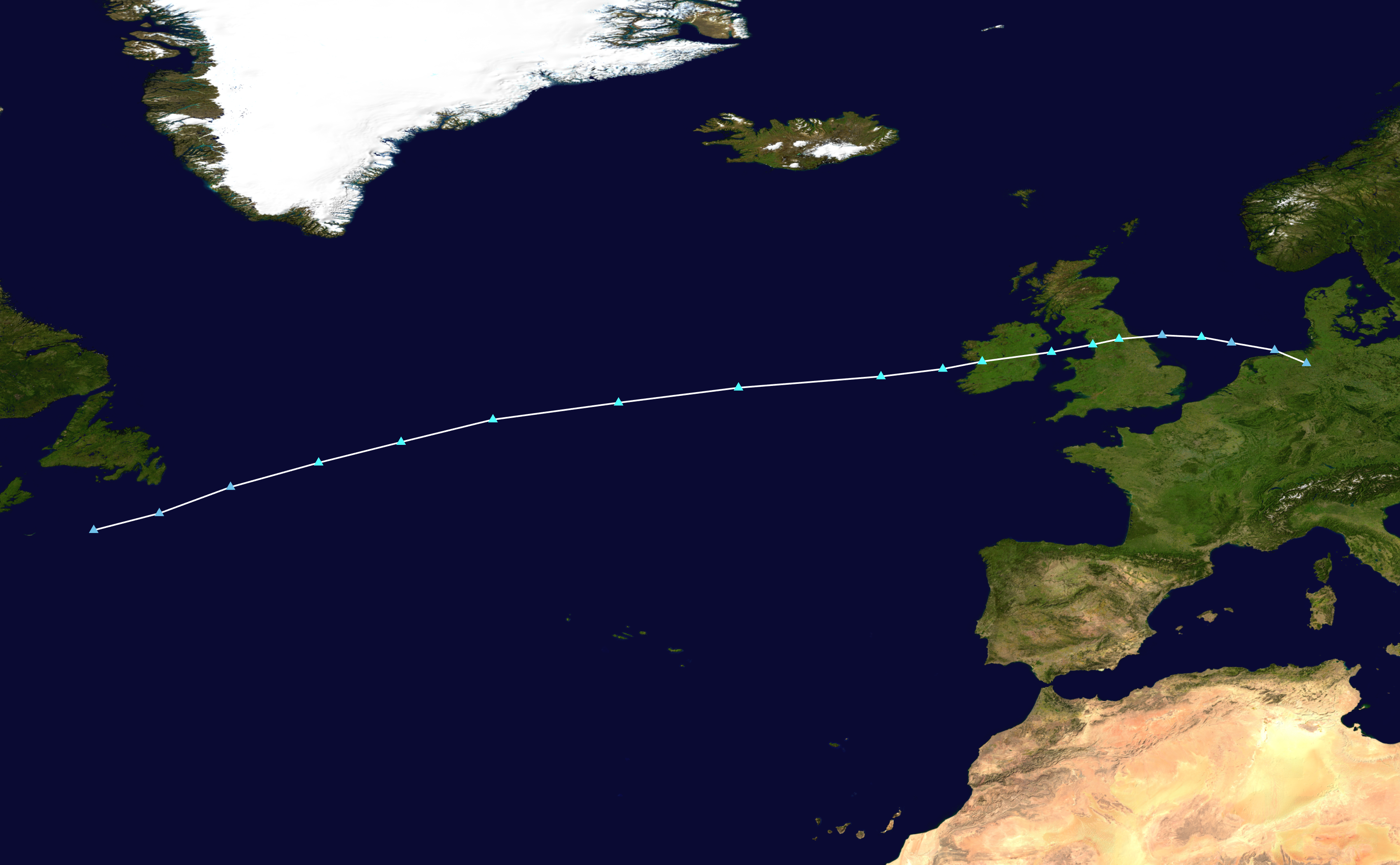
- Area affected: UK, Ireland, France, Spain
- Date of impact: 5–9 December 2021
- Maximum wind gust: 156 km/h (97 mph; 84 kn)
- Lowest pressure: 957 hPa (28.3 inHg)
- Fatalities: 3
- Power outages: 56,000
- Damage: Structural damage and overturned lorries, loss of power in UK and France.

Storm Barra was named by the Met Éireann and the Met Office on 5 December 2021 and was named Harry by the Free University of Berlin. Met Éireann confirmed the storm was named after the BBC Northern Ireland weatherman Barra Best. The storm brought strong winds and rain across much of Ireland and the UK on 6 and 7 December, with the rain turning to snow across northern England and Scotland. Winds were recorded up to 43 m/s (97 mph) of the coast of southern Ireland.

=== Storm Carmel ===
Storm Carmel
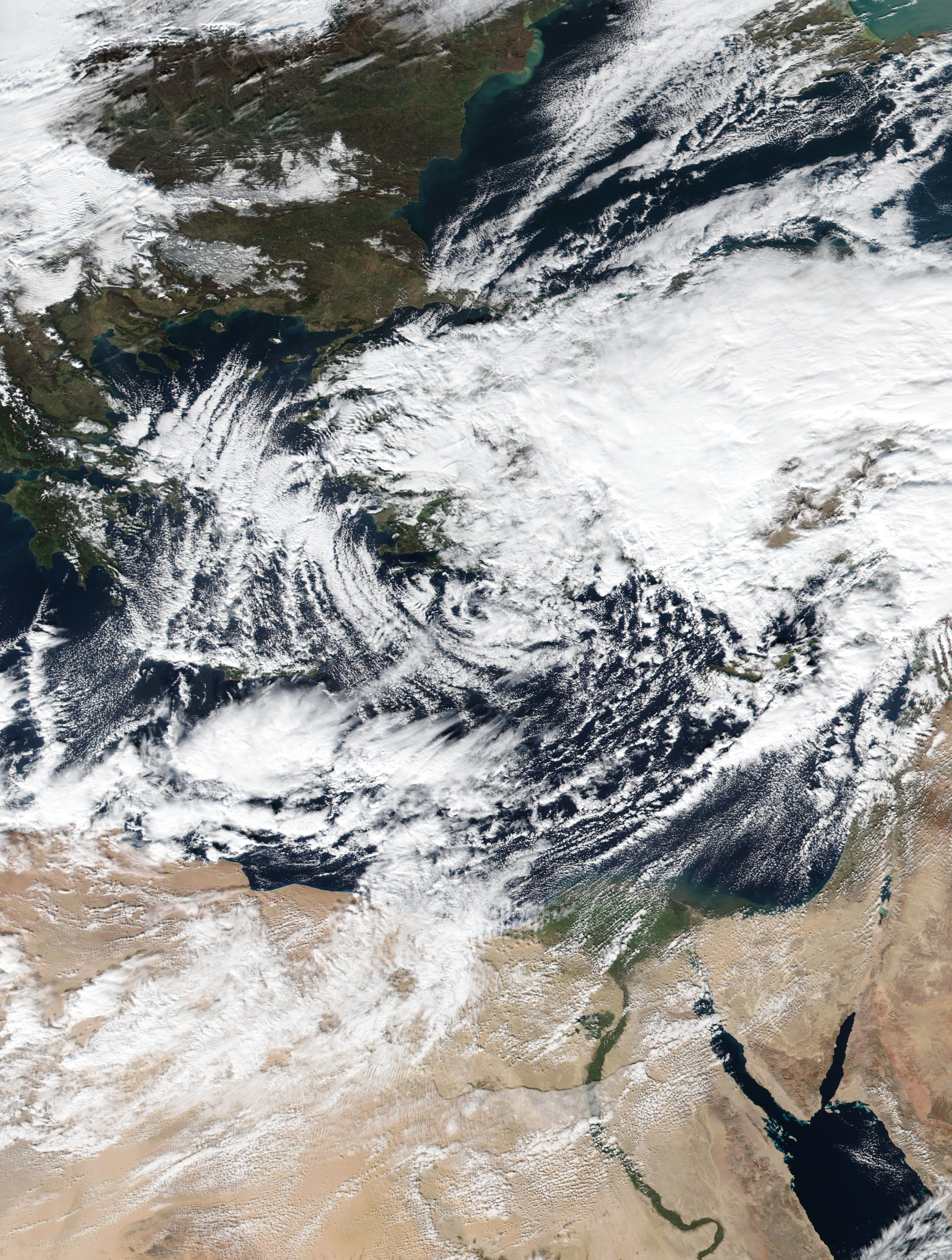

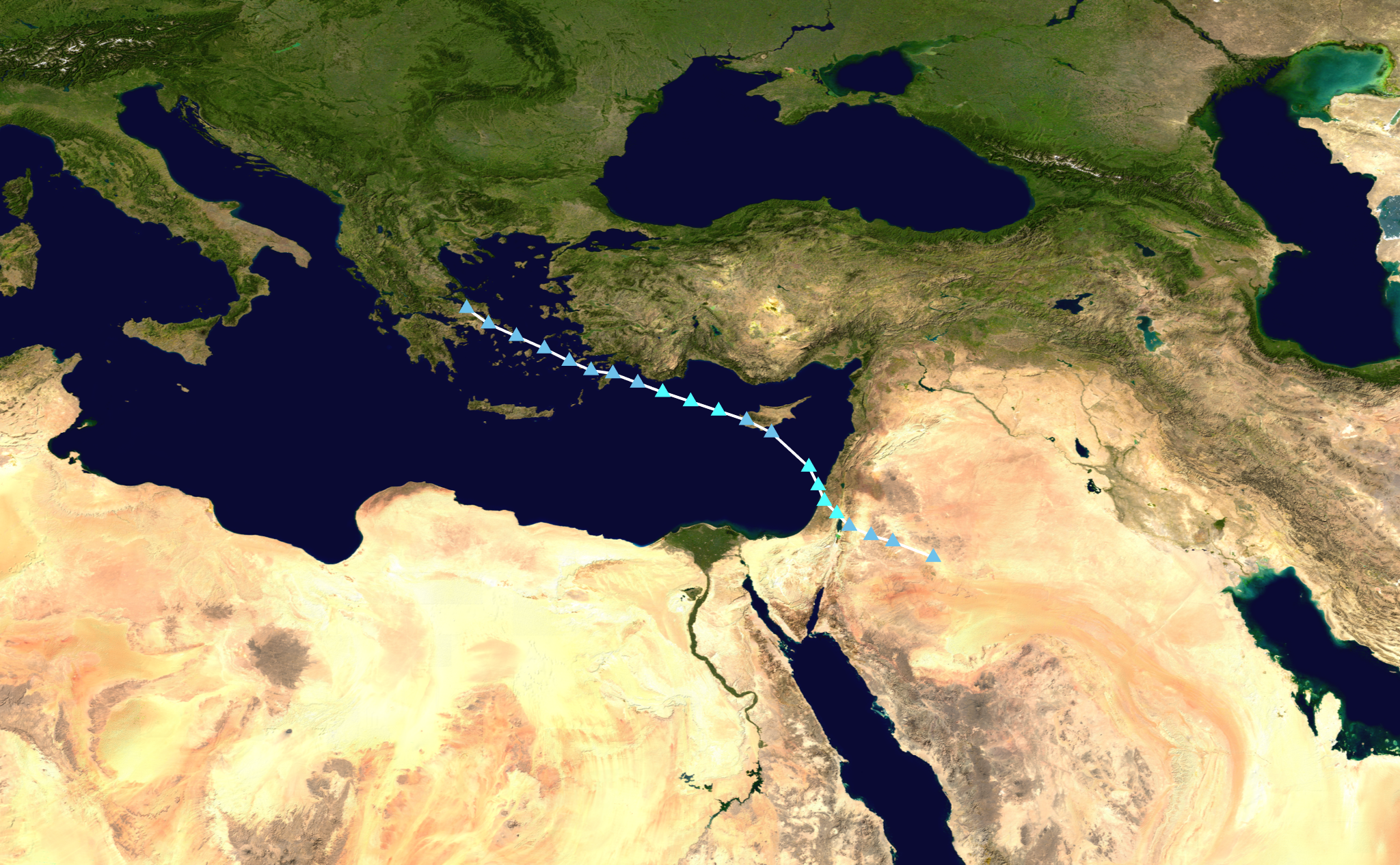
- Area affected: Greece, Cyprus, Israel
- Date of impact: 16–22 December 2021
- Maximum wind gust: 107 km/h (66 mph; 58 kn)
- Lowest pressure: Unspecified
- Fatalities: 4 dead, 1 Injured
- Power outages: Unspecified
- Damage: Unspecified

Storm Carmel was named by the Hellenic National Meteorological Service on 16 December 2021. In Israel, a person died due to a car crash, and three more died of hypothermia, bringing the death toll to four while a man suffered serious injuries from a falling tree. Flood warnings were put in place in Israel and snow fell in the mountains.

=== Storm Diomedes (Doreen) ===
Storm Diomedes
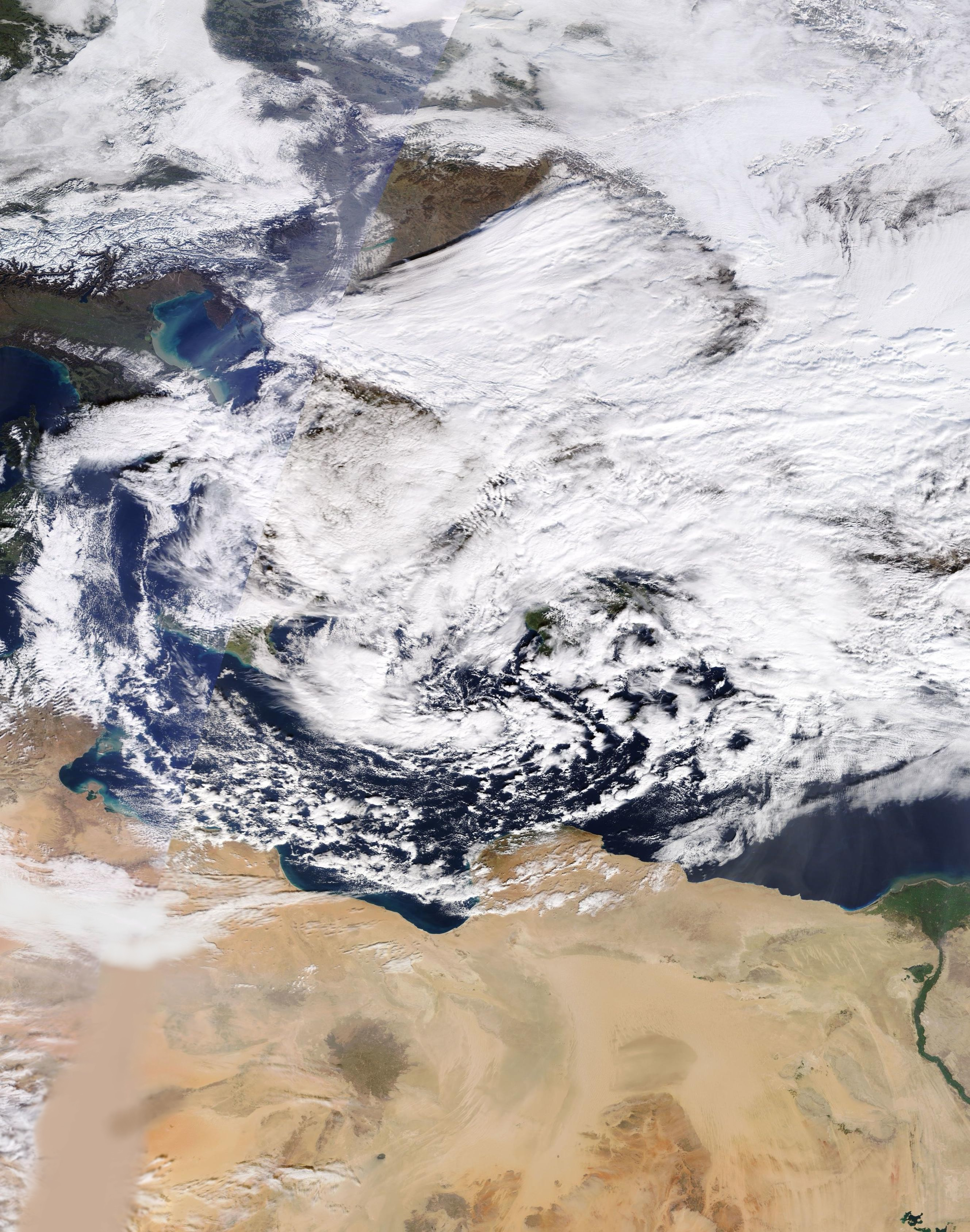

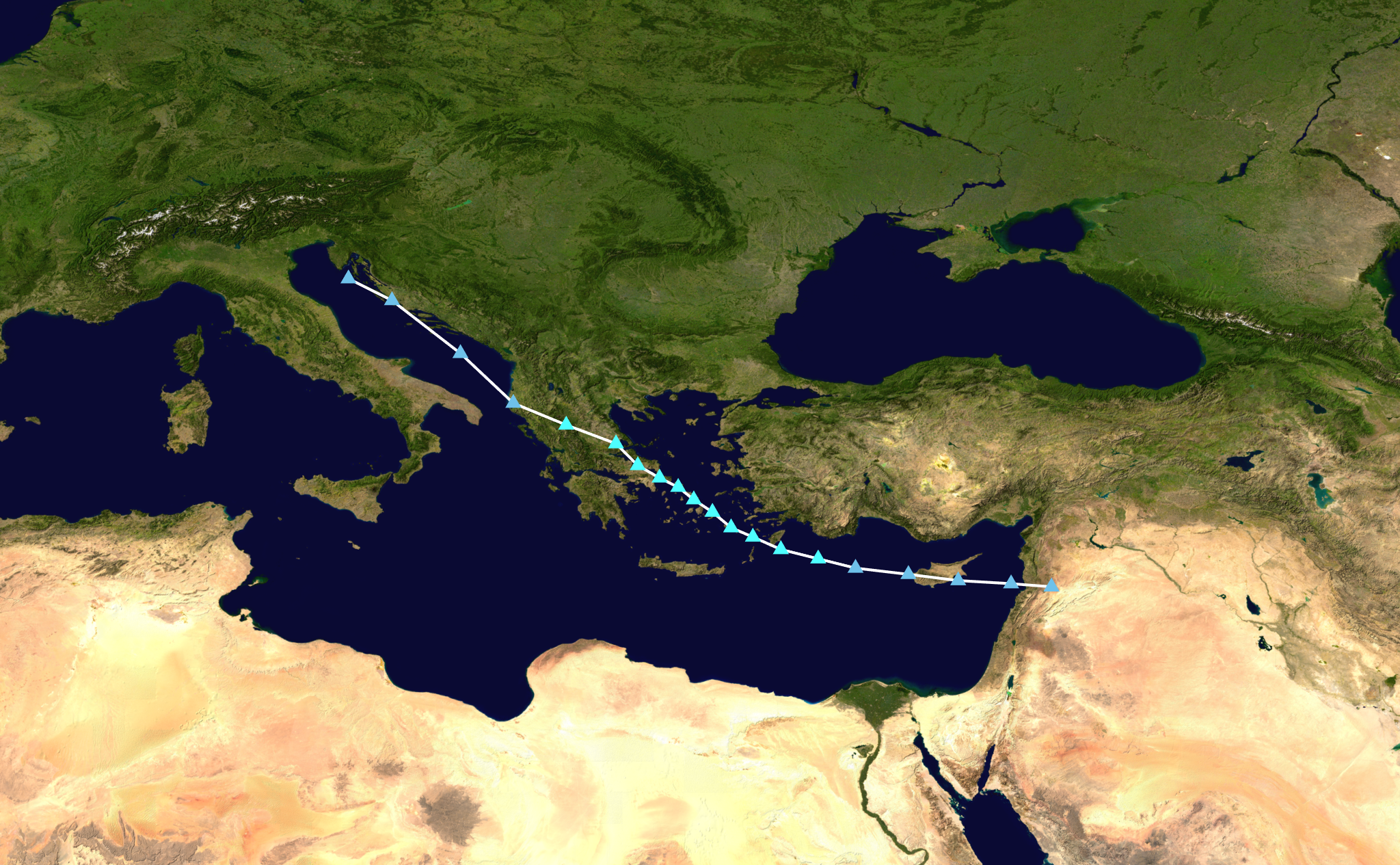
- Area affected: Greece
- Date of impact: 10–14 January 2022
- Maximum wind gust: Unspecified
- Lowest pressure: Unspecified
- Fatalities: 1 dead, 1 missing
- Power outages: Unspecified
- Damage: Unspecified

Storm Diomedes was named by the Hellenic National Meteorological Service on 10 January 2022 and was named Doreen by the Free University of Berlin the next day. The storm dropped snowfall up to 56cm on the mountain areas by Lamia, along with heavy rainfall to Greece which caused some rivers to overflow, with winds up to 10 on the Beaufort scale.

=== Storm Elpis ===
Storm Elpis
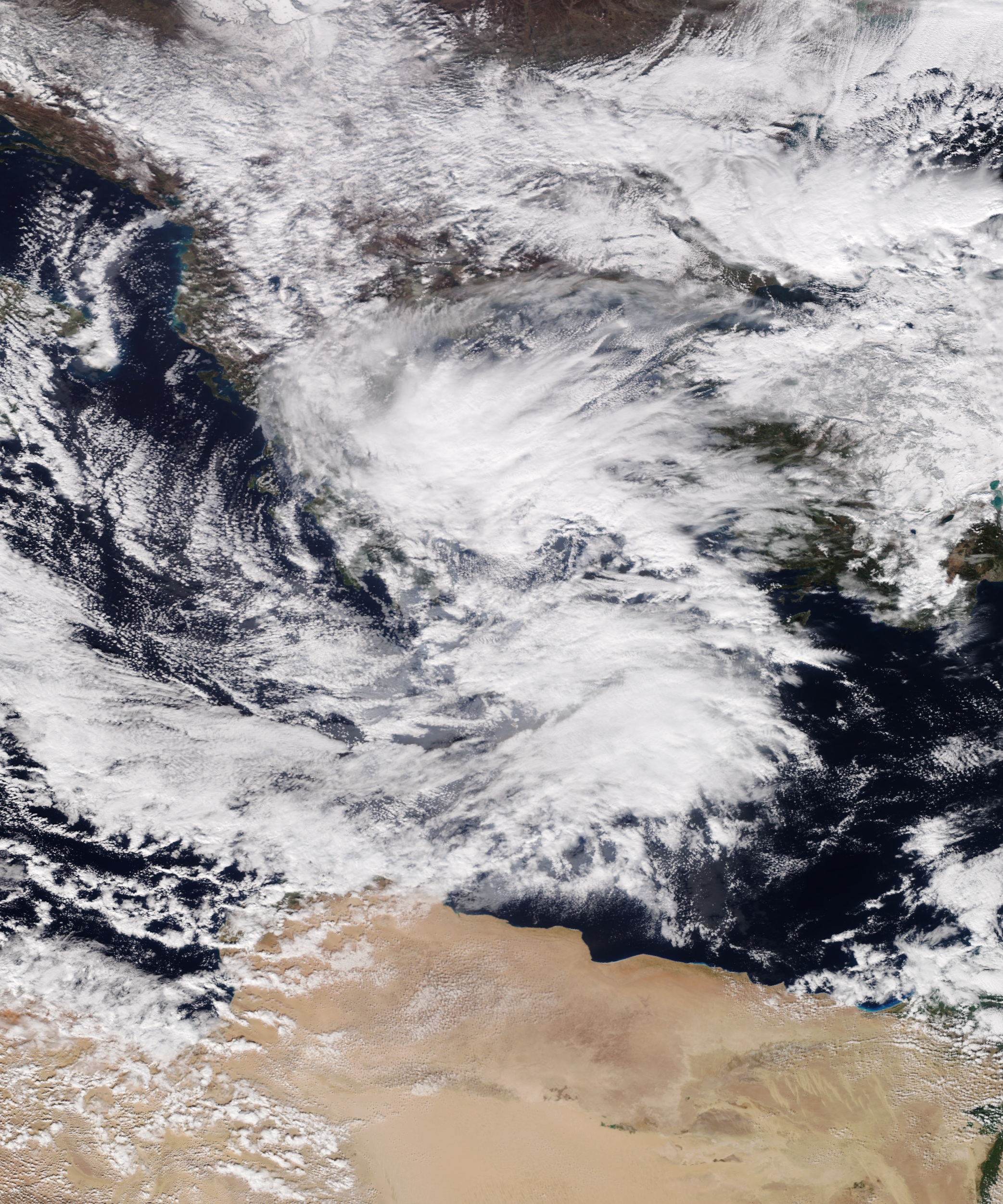

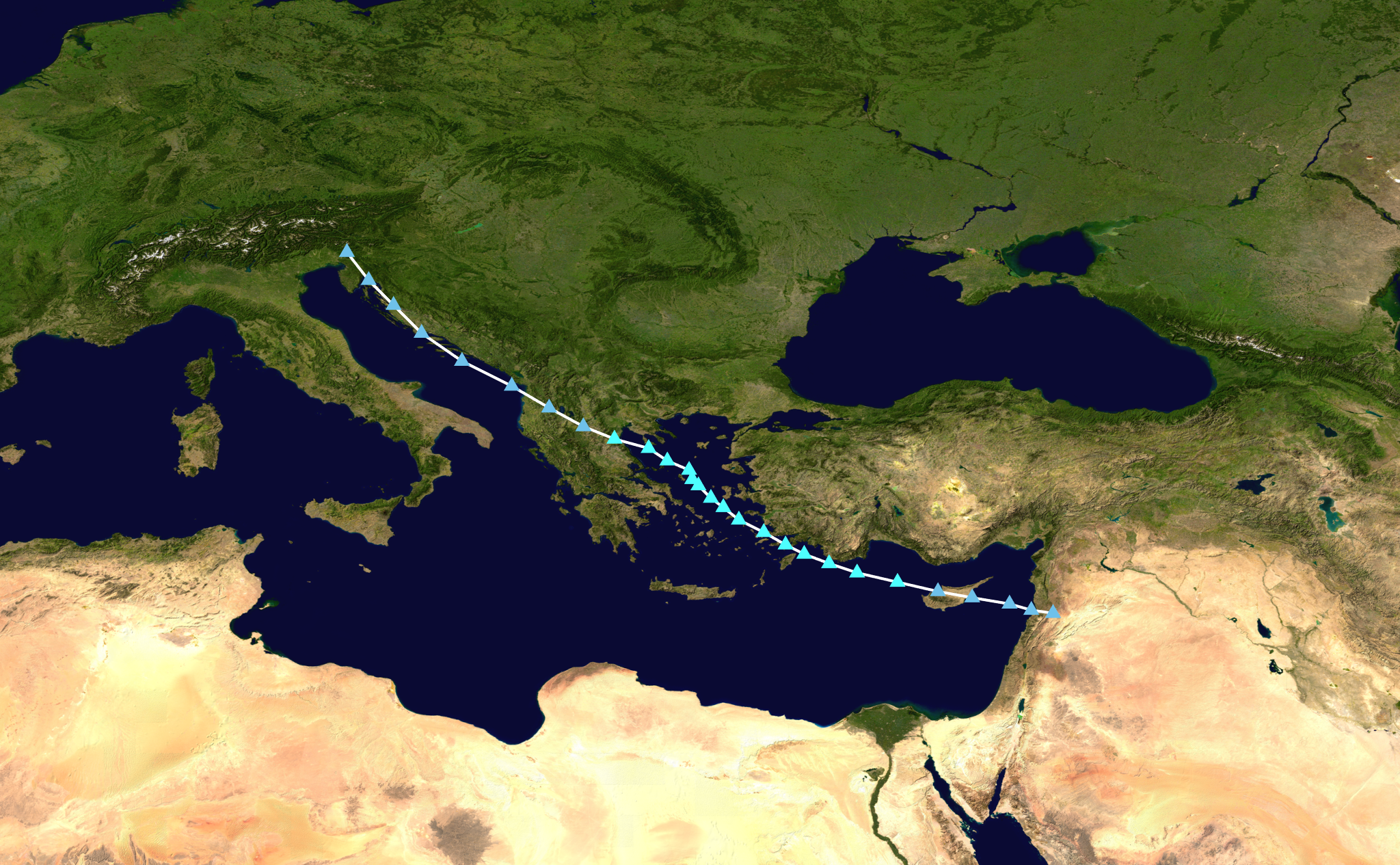
- Area affected: Greece, Cyprus, Israel, Turkey
- Date of impact: 21–27 January 2022
- Maximum wind gust: Unspecified
- Lowest pressure: Unspecified
- Fatalities: 3 dead, 18 injured
- Power outages: Unspecified
- Damage: Unspecified

Storm Elpis was named on 21 January 2022. The Hellenic National Meteorological Service reported that a land spout occurred on Andros due to the storm. Elpis impacted Israel on 26 January. The storm also killed 3 people, with 18 injured after thousands were trapped in a snowstorm in Turkey.

=== Storm Malik ===
Storm Malik
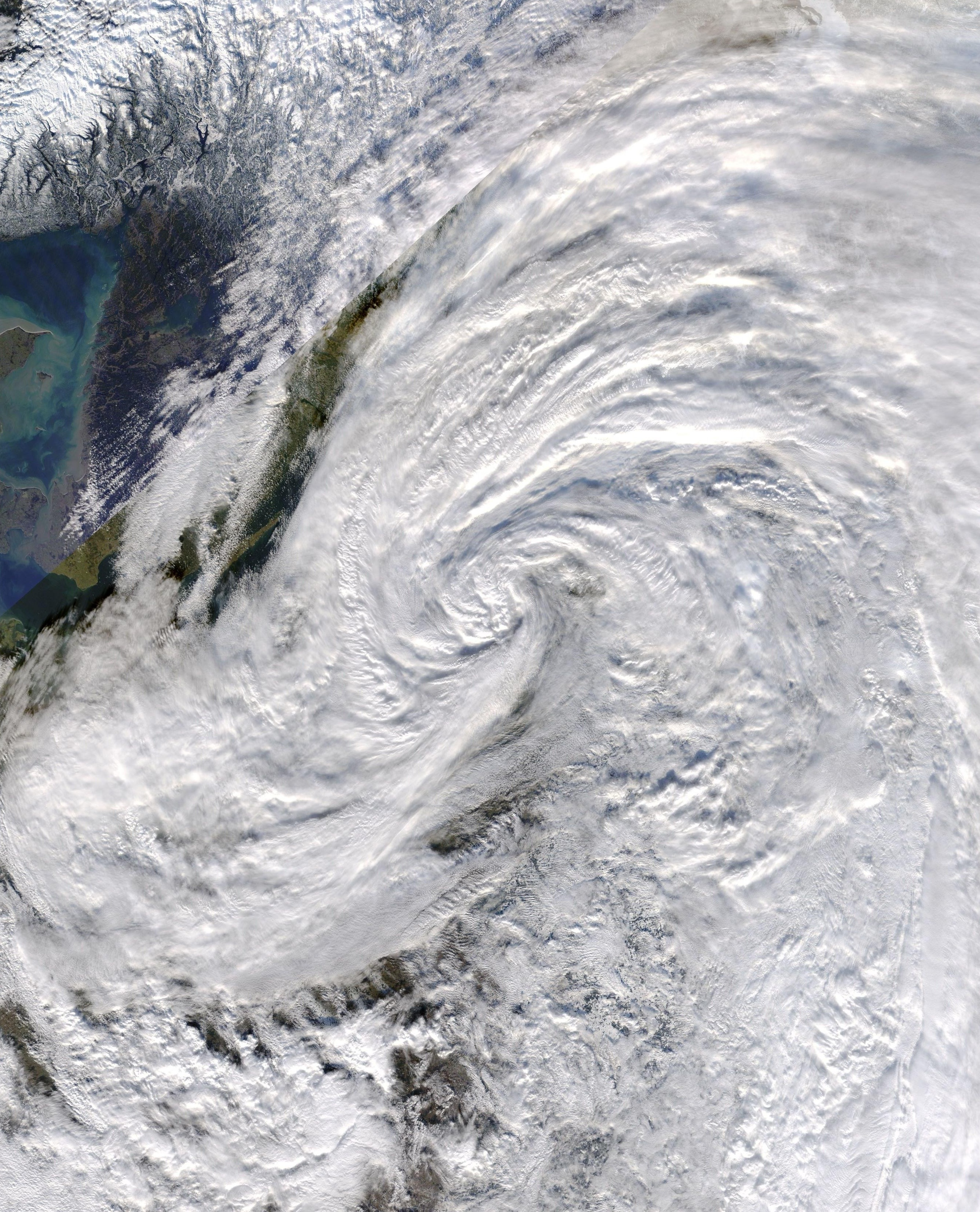

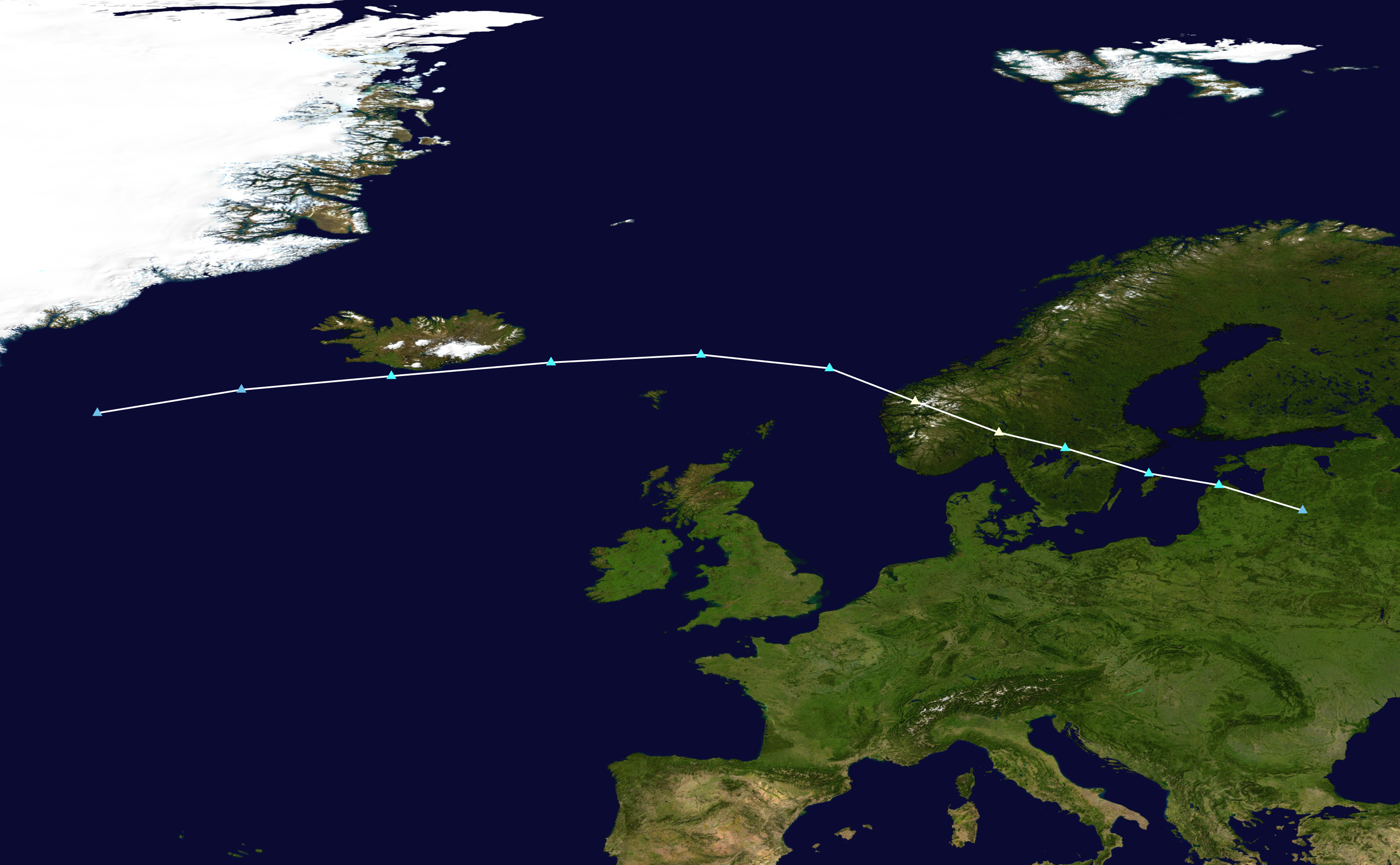
- Area affected: UK, Ireland, Denmark, Norway, Sweden, Finland, Lithuania, Latvia, Estonia, Germany, Poland, Czech Republic
- Date of impact: 28–30 January 2022
- Maximum wind gust: 236 km/h (147 mph; 127 kn)
- Lowest pressure: 965 hPa (28.5 inHg)
- Fatalities: 7
- Power outages: 810,000
- Damage: Structural damage and loss of power across Europe

On 28 January, Storm Malik was named by the Danish Meteorological Institute (a part of the Northern Europe storm naming group), after the Greenlandic name that also means "wave". In Finland and Germany, which are not part of the storm naming groups, it was named Valtteri by the Finnish Meteorological Institute, while the Free University of Berlin named the same system as Nadia.

Three fatalities were reported due to Storm Malik in the United Kingdom: a 60-year-old woman in Aberdeen, Scotland and a 9-year-old boy in Staffordshire, England. Both were hit by falling trees. A 32-year-old man died in a traffic accident related to the storm in Scotland. In Denmark, a 78-year-old woman died from injuries sustained when a door she opened was caught by the wind and she fell. In Germany, a person in Beelitz was killed when hit by a poster that had come loose and in Poland a person was killed when a tree fell on a moving car in Wejherowo County. In the Czech Republic, a worker died after being buried by a wall. More than 680,000 people were left without power in Poland and in the United Kingdom around 130,000 lost power.

In Sweden around 40,000 households lost power, mostly in the south. Two teenagers were also injured in the southern Swedish region of Scania when their car was hit by a falling tree. In the city of Malmö, many facade panels from the Turning Torso building fell. In the Västra Hamnen (The West Harbour) area a crane from a construction site got overturned and landed close to a bus stop full of people however nobody was injured. A second crane got overturned in the city of Malmö and landed on parked cars. Another crane got overturned in the city of Södertälje south of Stockholm and landed on a hospital but only caused slight damage to windows in the ICU section. Many trees fell throughout southern Sweden. Many trees also fell in Norrtälje, a town north of Stockholm which was hit by another similar storm back in January 2019 called Alfrida.

The storm caused damage to the Lithuanian coast as well, with local authorities calling it the "worst storm since Cyclone Anatol in 1999". The storm reached winds of 93 km/h (26 m/s; 50 kn) with gusts of 125 km/h (35 m/s; 67 kn). The storm did not cause any fatalities, but considerably damaged infrastructure and protective dunes along the Curonian Spit.

Strongest wind gusts measured during Storm Malik (1-min sustained converted from 10-min sustained)
Location	Wind gust	1-minute sustained windspeed	Time (local)
Cairngorm, United Kingdom	147 mph (237 km/h; 128 kn)	118 mph (190 km/h; 103 kn)	06h-07h, 29 January 2022
Cairnwell, United Kingdom	120 mph (190 km/h; 100 kn)	100 mph (160 km/h; 87 kn)	07h-08h, 29 January 2022
Fort William, United Kingdom	113 mph (182 km/h; 98 kn)	Unspecified.	Unspecified.
Bealach Na Ba, United Kingdom	104 mph (167 km/h; 90 kn)	79 mph (127 km/h; 69 kn)	05h-06h, 29 January 2022
Glen Ogle, United Kingdom	98 mph (158 km/h; 85 kn)	65 mph (105 km/h; 56 kn)	06h-07h, 29 January 2022

=== Storm Corrie ===
Storm Corrie
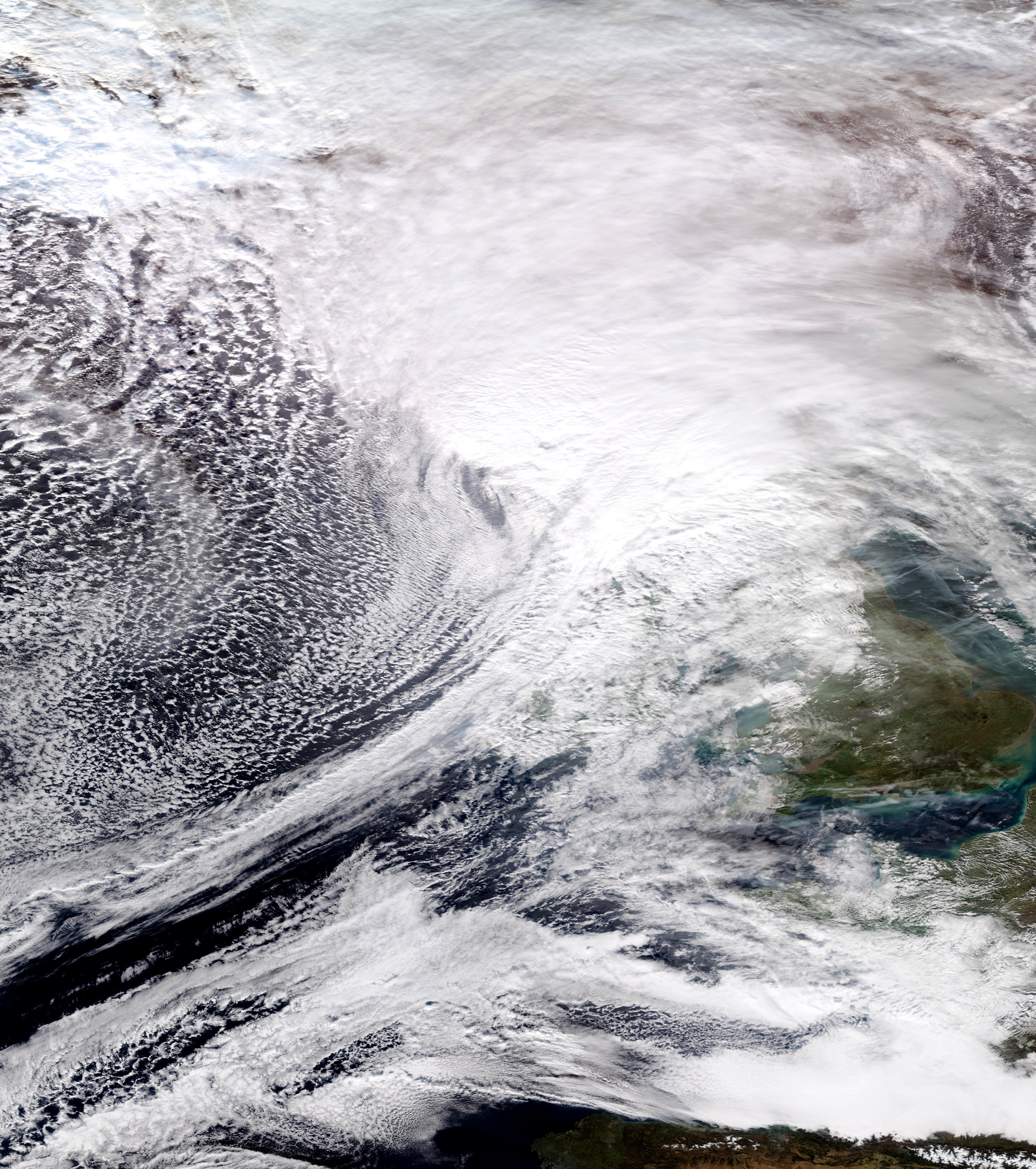

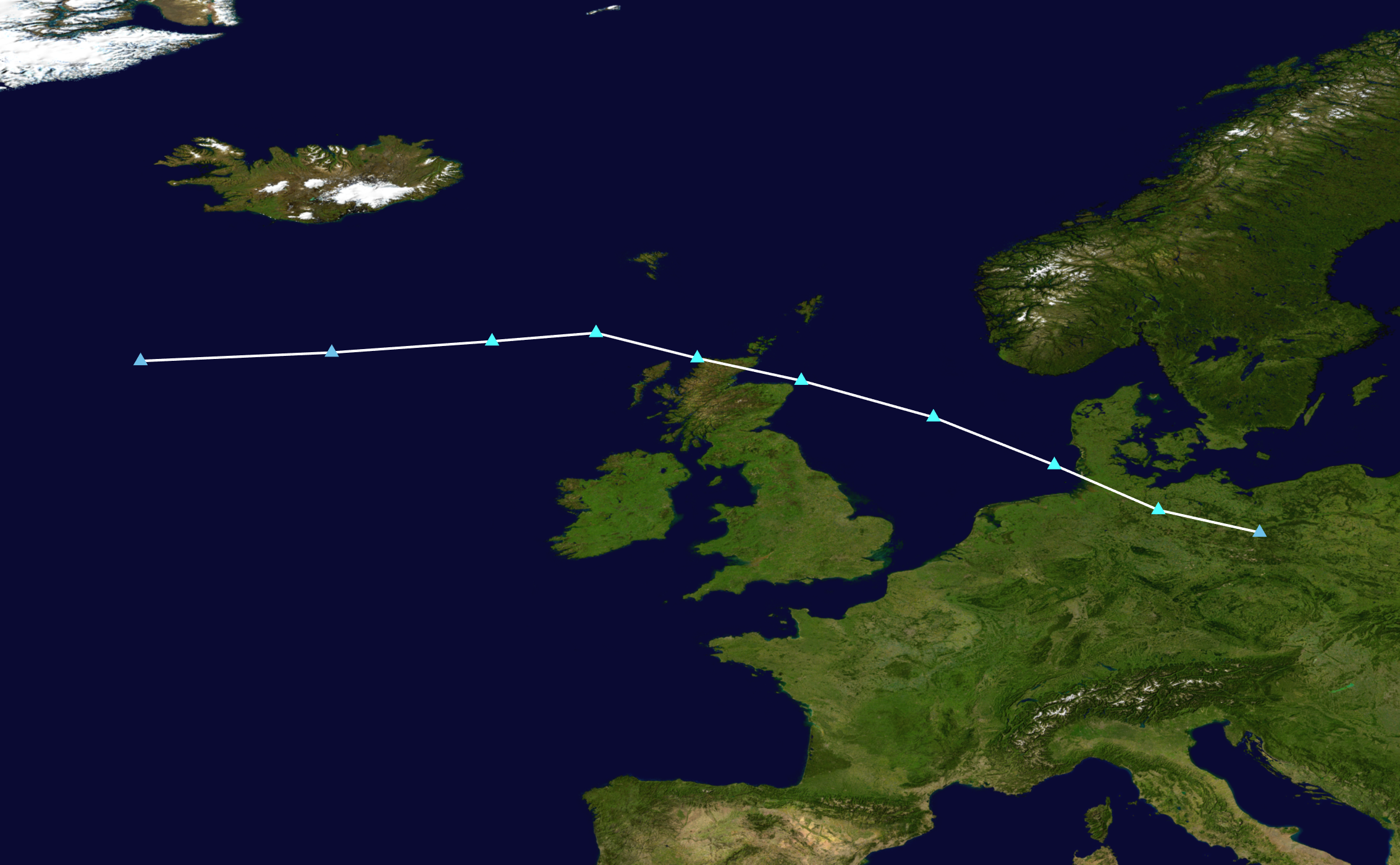
- Area affected: United Kingdom, Ireland, Netherlands
- Date of impact: 29 – 31 January 2022
- Maximum wind gust: 150 km/h (93 mph; 81 kn)
- Lowest pressure: 986 hPa (29.1 inHg)
- Fatalities: 0
- Power outages: Unspecified
- Damage: Structural damage and overturned lorries, loss of power across most of Northern Europe

Storm Corrie was named on 29 January 2022 by the Met Office. Storm Corrie prompted Amber wind warnings to be issued for the northeast of Scotland. A peak gust of 42 m/s (93 mph) was recorded on the east coast of Scotland. A wider yellow warning was issued for most of the east coast of England down to the north coast of Norfolk.

In the Netherlands, the combination of Storm Corrie and a high tide forecast in the North Sea led to the decision to close the Oosterscheldekering.

=== Storm Dudley ===
Storm Dudley
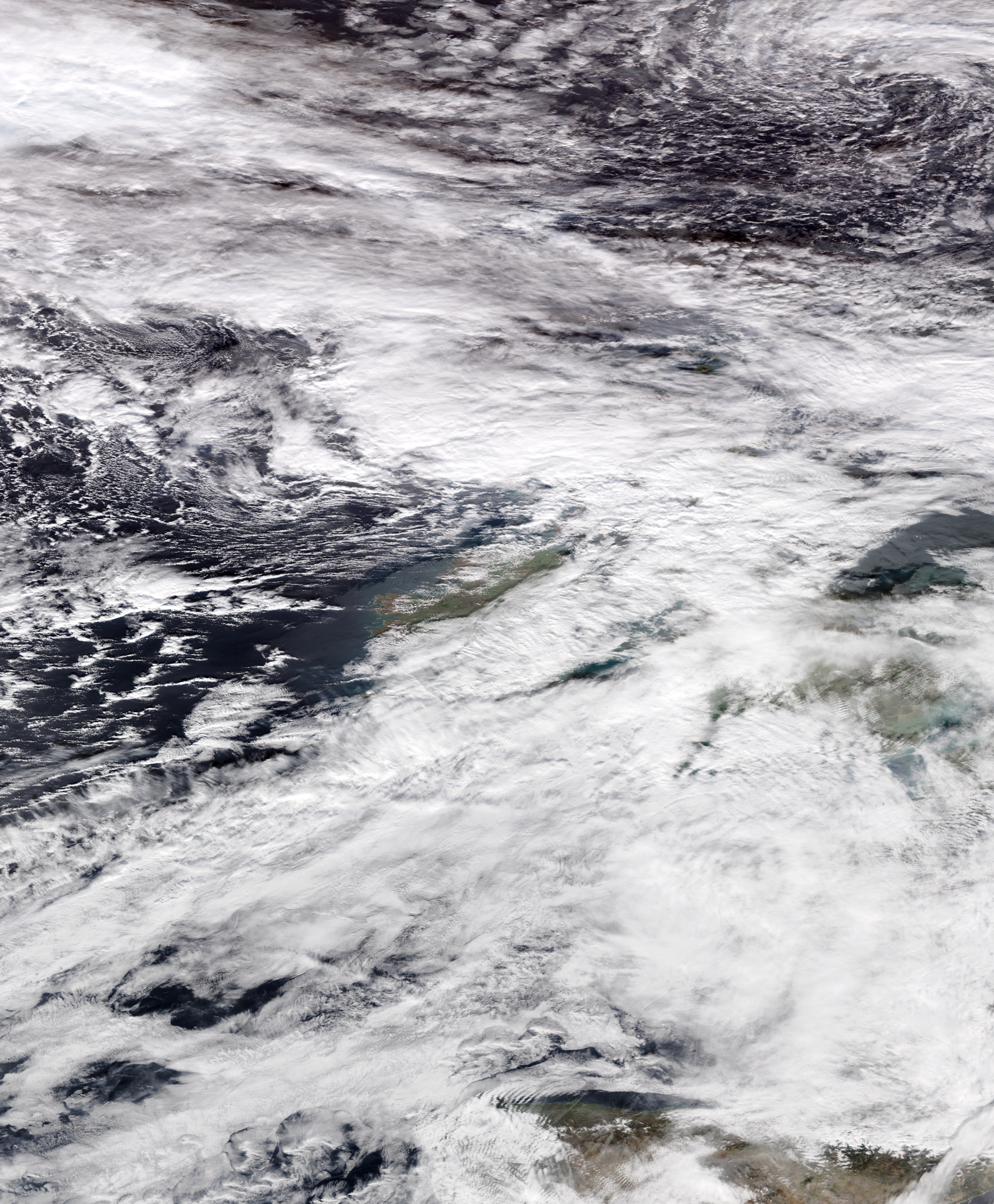

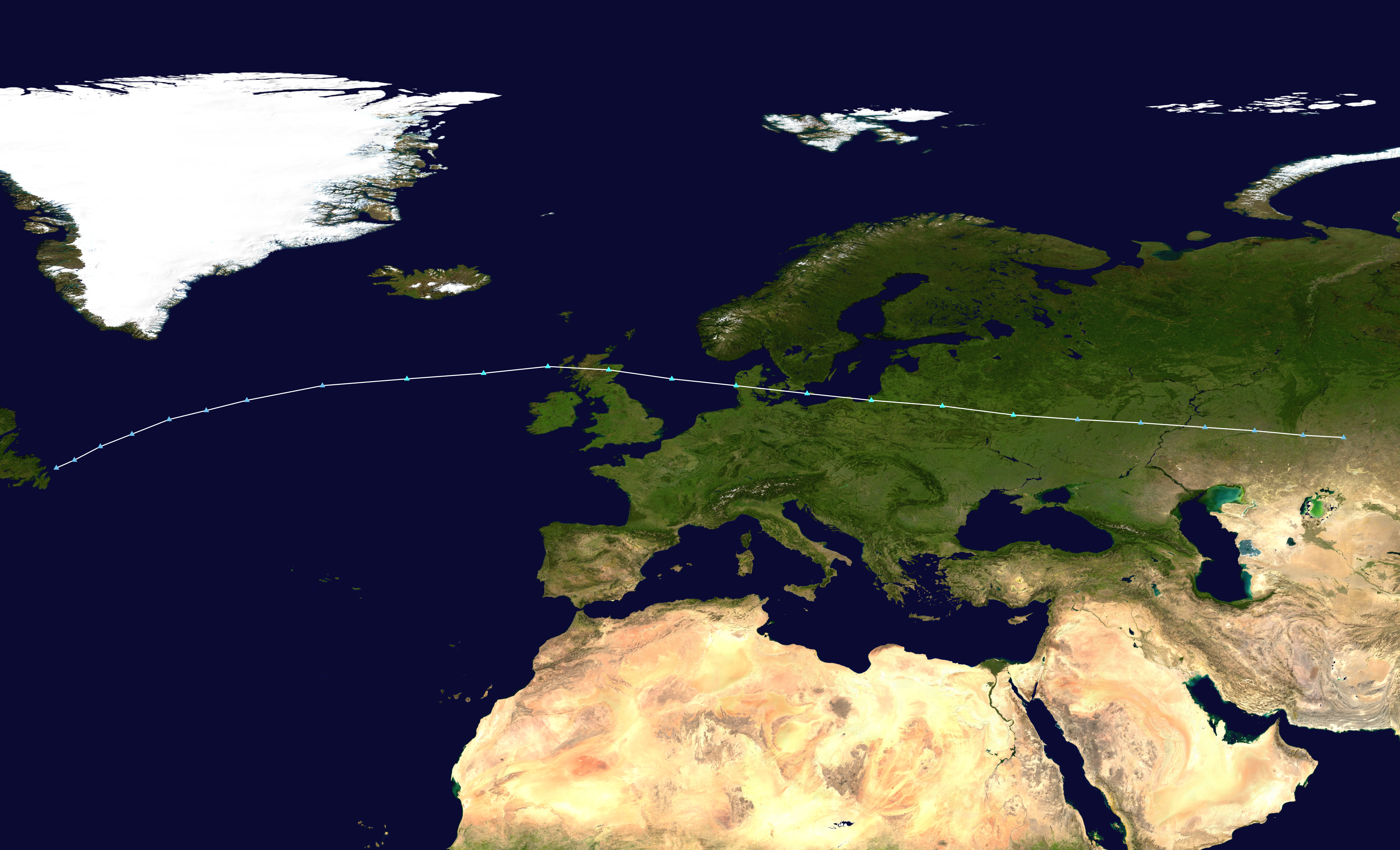
- Area affected: United Kingdom, Germany, Poland, The Netherlands, Czech Republic, Lithuania
- Date of impact: 14 – 19 February 2022
- Maximum wind gust: 131 km/h (81 mph)
- Lowest pressure: 965 hPa (28.5 inHg)
- Fatalities: 9 deaths, 5 injuries
- Power outages: 225,000
- Damage: Structural damage and overturned lorries, loss of power in several areas in Europe

Storm Dudley was named on 14 February 2022 by the Met Office. An amber warning was issued towards parts of Scotland and Northern England on Wednesday, 16 February. The same system has been named by the Free University of Berlin as Ylenia. On 17 February, a tornado confirmed by the European Severe Storms Laboratory touched down in Poland causing damage to buildings. A man in Western Poland near Gorzów Wielkopolski died when a tree fell on his car. Another two men were killed when a crane fell on them in Kraków and two other people were seriously injured in the same accident. caused by a tornado. At least 11 tornadoes were spawned by Dudley in Poland. Three people died in Germany, two in Lithuania and one in the United Kingdom.

=== Storm Eunice ===
Storm Eunice
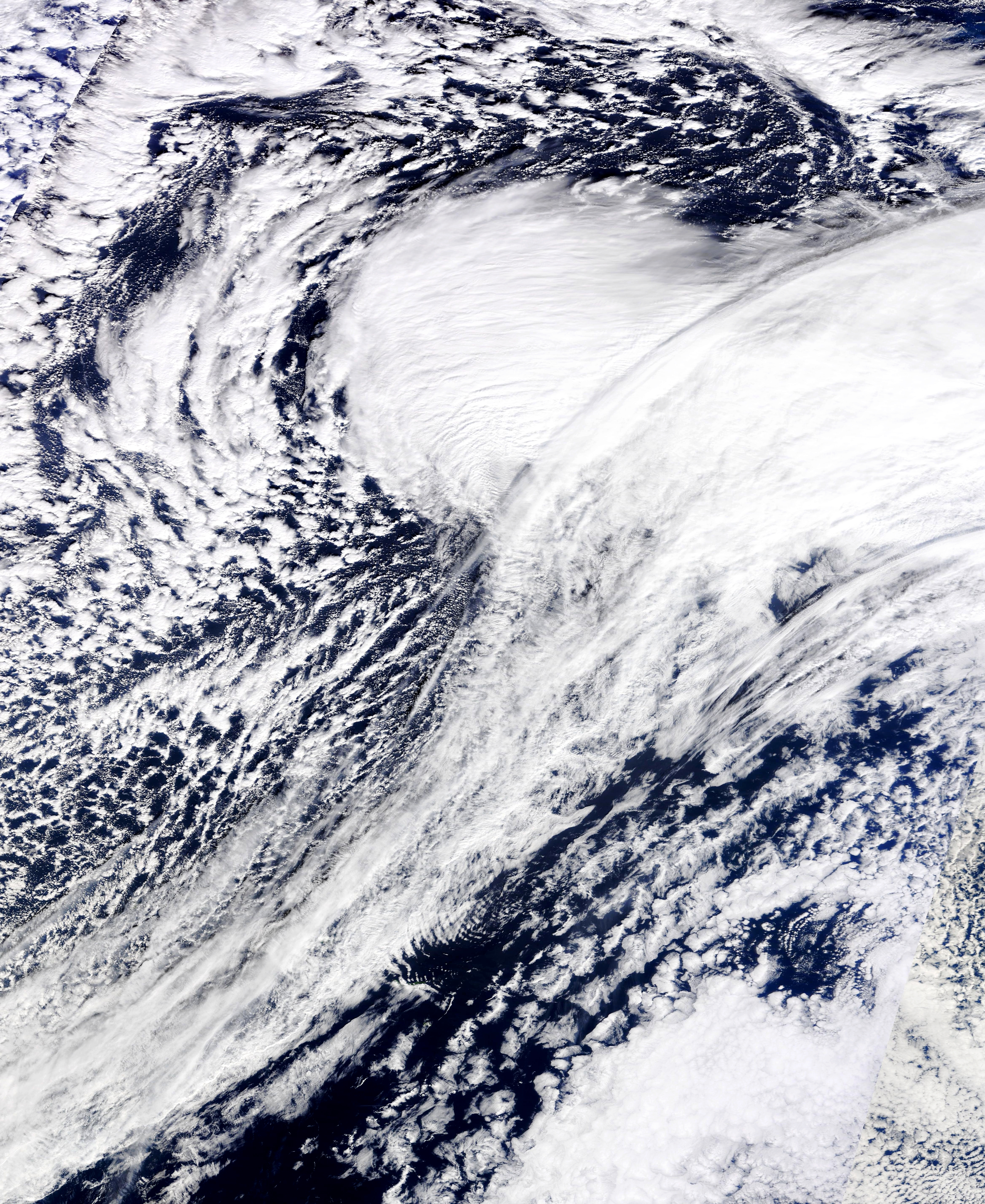

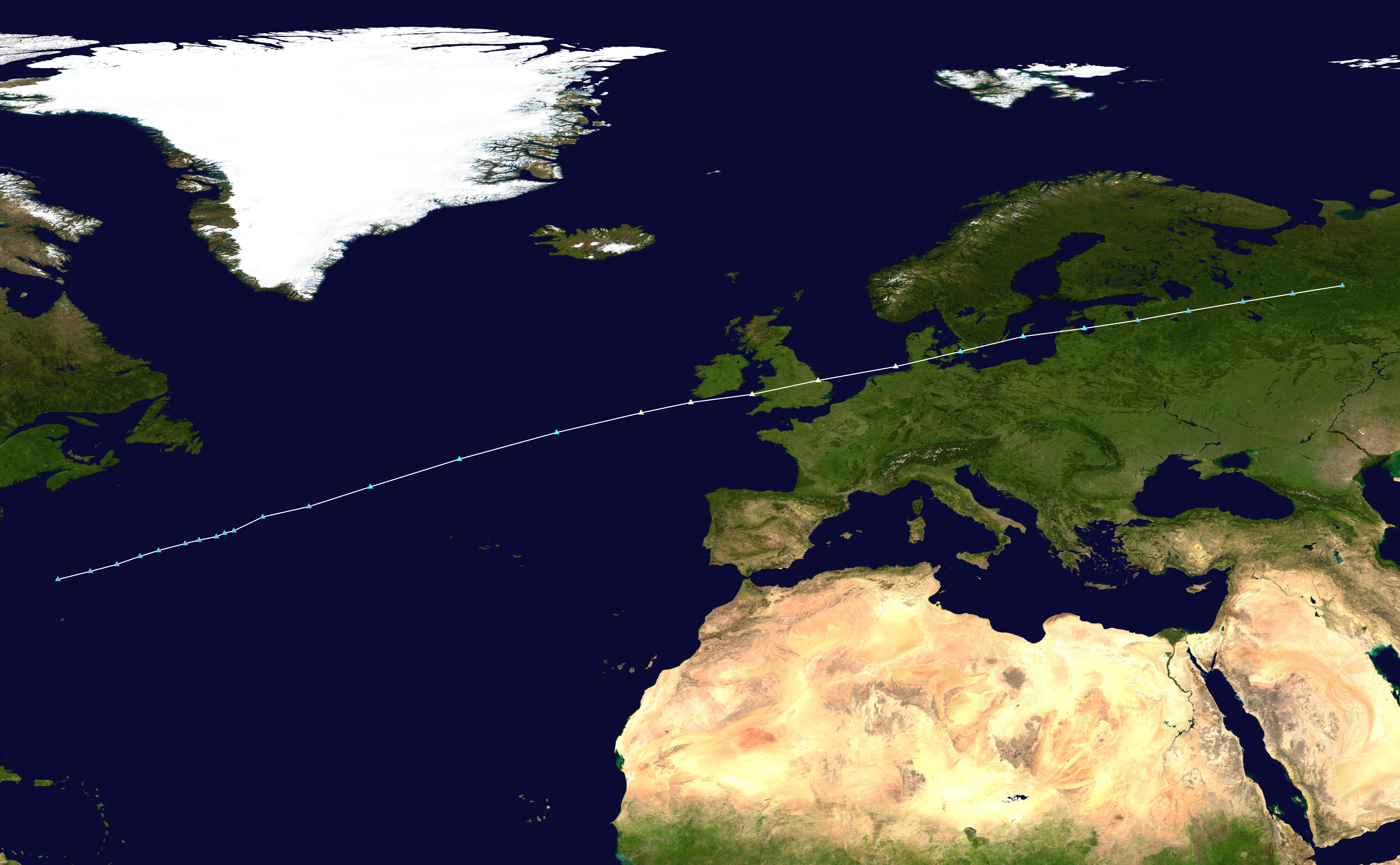
- Area affected: United Kingdom, Ireland, Netherlands, Belgium, Germany, Poland, Denmark, France, Lithuania, Czech Republic, Russia, Belarus
- Date of impact: 14 – 20 February 2022
- Maximum wind gust: 196 km/h (122 mph; 106 kn)
- Lowest pressure: 960 hPa (28 inHg)
- Fatalities: 17 deaths, several injured
- Power outages: 3,100,000
- Damage: >€1.83 billion

Storm Eunice was named on 14 February 2022 by the Met Office. An amber weather warning was issued on 16 February for Southern England, The Midlands, Wales and parts of North West England. The same day, the Free University of Berlin named the extratropical cyclone as Zeynep. A red weather warning was subsequently issued on 17 February for parts of south-west England and south Wales, meaning a danger to life from flying debris. A second, rare red warning was issued for the south-east of the United Kingdom including London, Kent, Essex, and Suffolk. On the Isle of Wight, wind gusts of up to 122 mph were recorded, making it the strongest wind gust ever recorded in England.

At least 17 fatalities have been recorded due to Storm Eunice. A person was killed in County Wexford, Ireland by a falling tree, while a woman died in London, England after a tree fell on her car; several other people were injured by flying debris and falling trees in the UK. Elsewhere in the UK, a man died in Merseyside after debris hit his windscreen and another man died in Alton, Hampshire after his pick-up truck collided with a tree. In mainland Europe, 13 deaths occurred: four in the Netherlands, two in Belgium, four in Poland, and three in Germany.

=== Storm Franklin ===
Storm Franklin
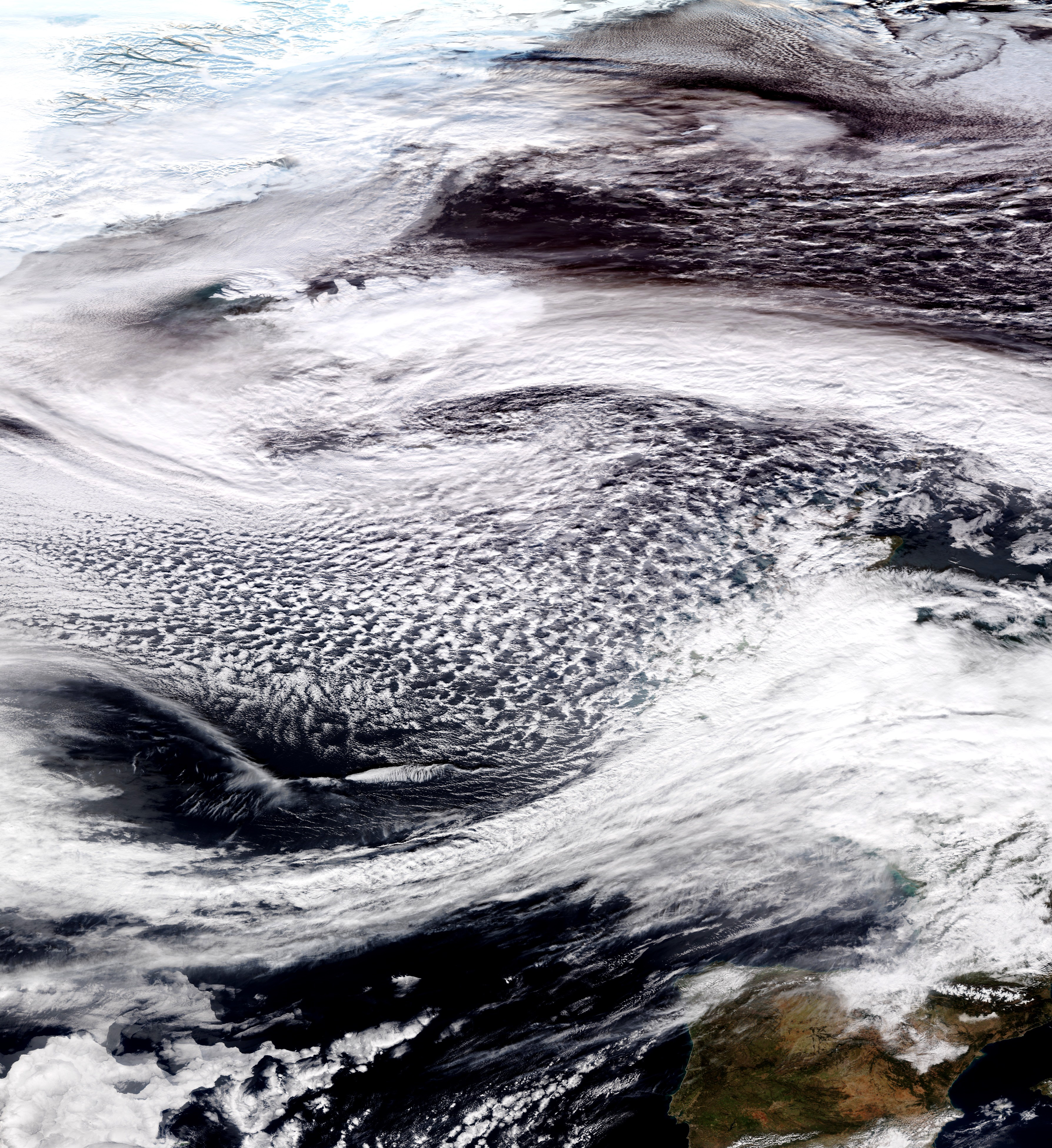

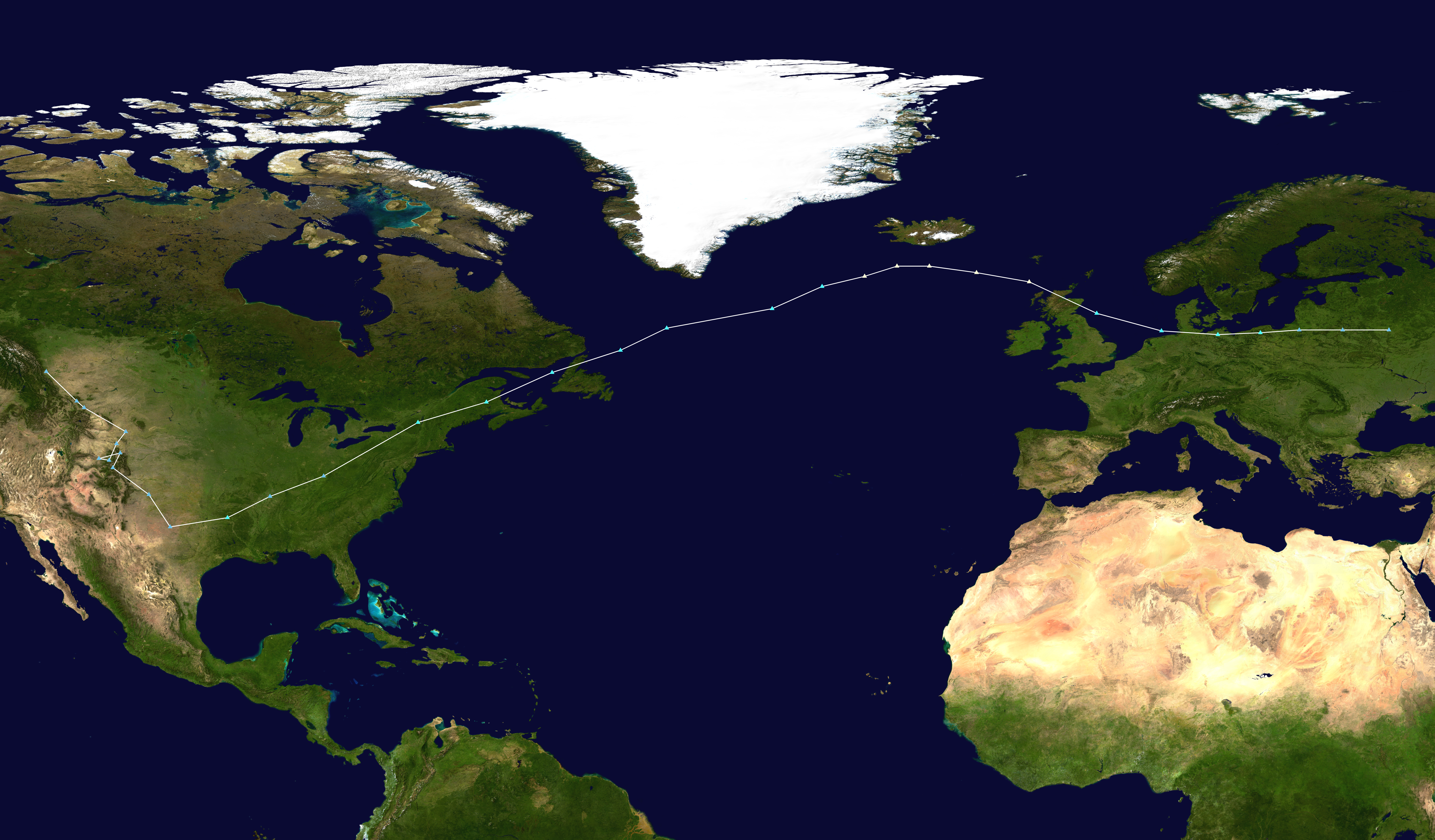
- Area affected: United Kingdom, Ireland, France, Netherlands, Germany
- Date of impact: 20 – 22 February 2022
- Maximum wind gust: 149 km/h (93 mph), Feldberg, Schwarzwald.
- Lowest pressure: 952 hPa (28.1 inHg)
- Fatalities: 2 (in France)
- Power outages: >29,000
- Damage: $754 million (2022 USD), €693 million (2022 Euros)

Storm Franklin, known in Germany as Storm Antonia, was first noted by the United Kingdom's Met Office on 12:00 UTC on 19 February. The next day, the Met Office would name it Franklin. Franklin would be last noted on 22 February. Franklin would be the third windstorm in a week to be named by the Met Office, the first time since they started naming windstorms in 2015. In total, Franklin would cause around $754 million (2022 USD) in damages, and two fatalities in Normandy, France. In Ireland, over 29,000 homes and businesses lost power.

=== Storm Bianca ===
Storm Bianca
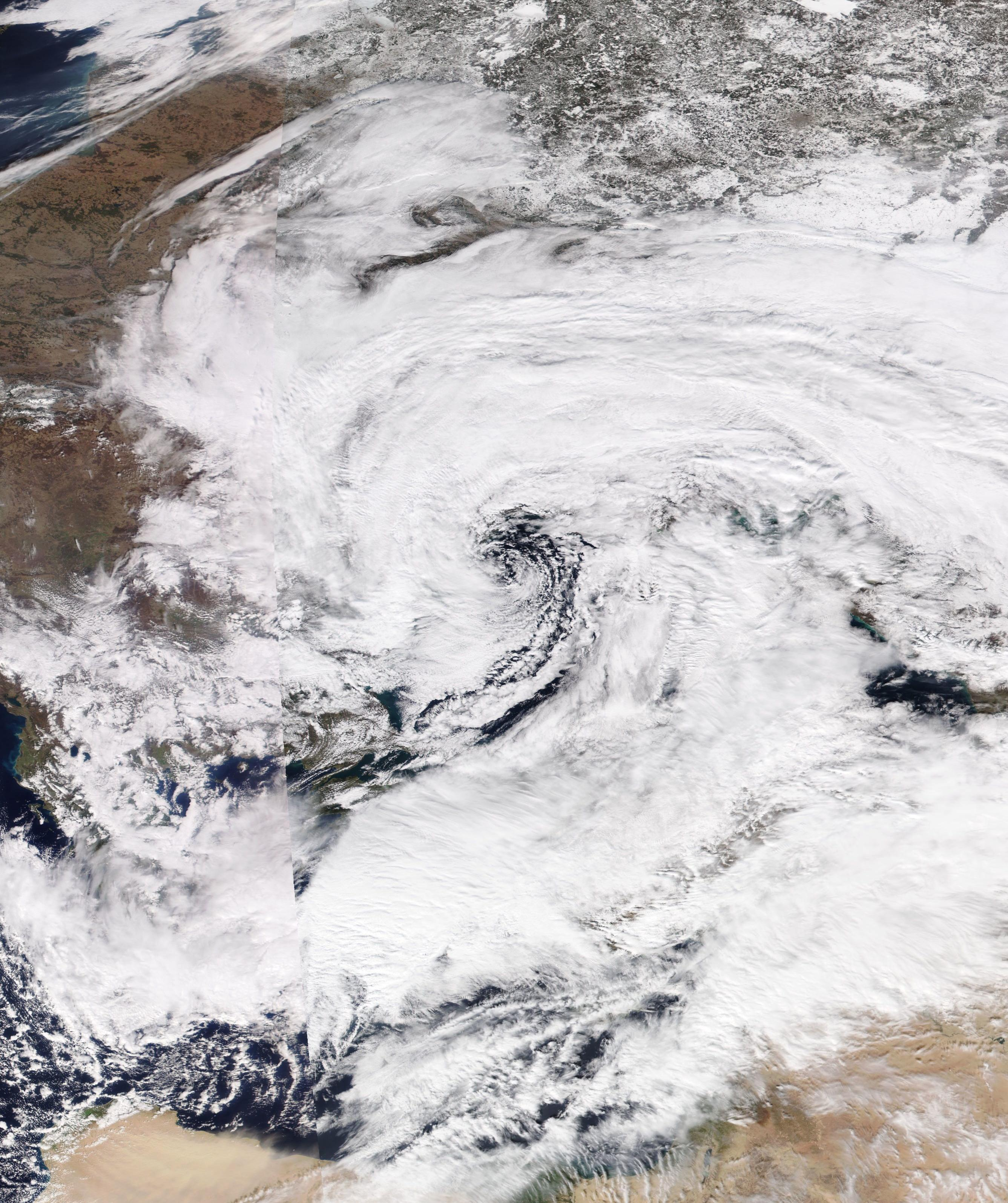

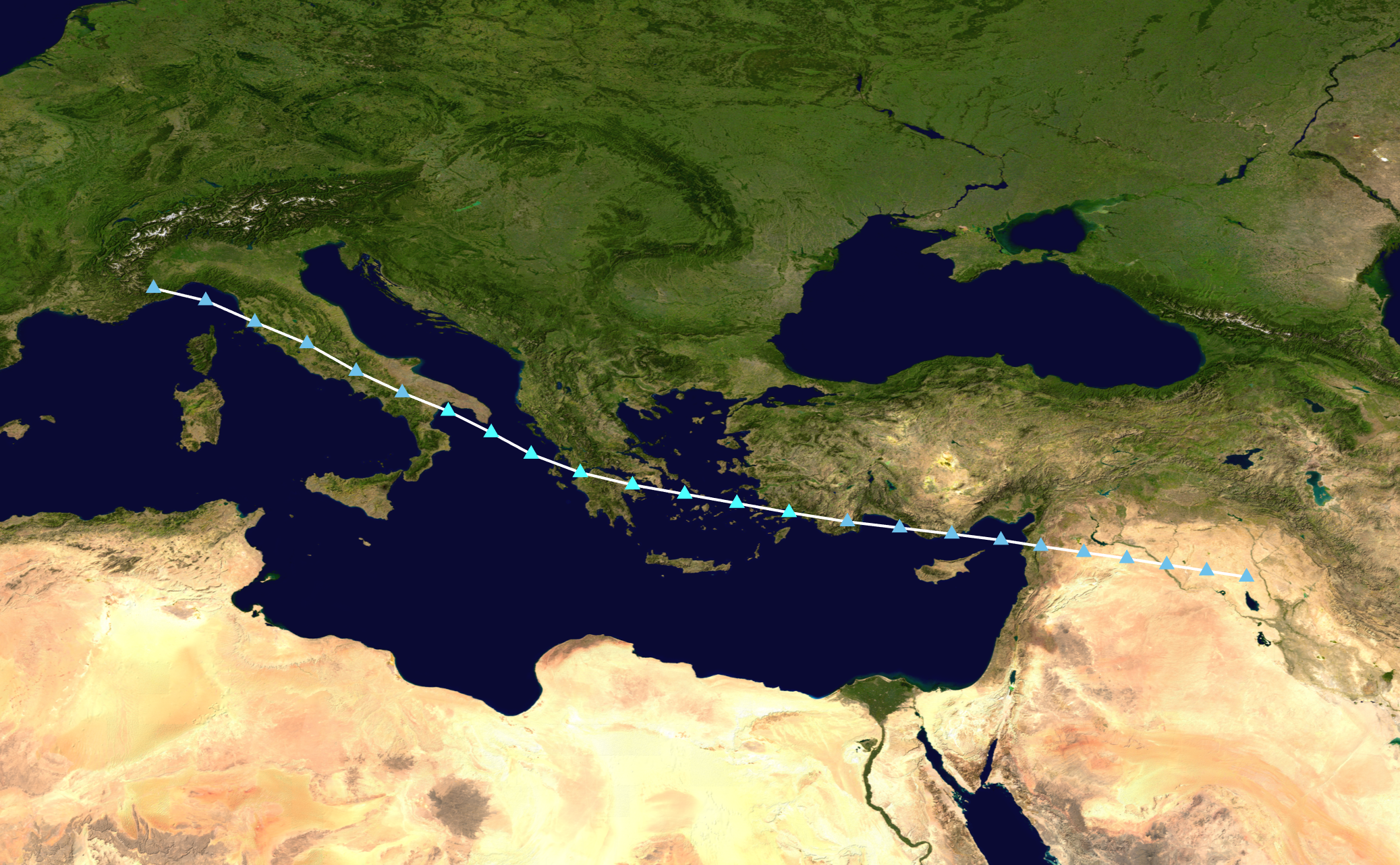
- Area affected: Italy, Greece
- Date of impact: 25 February – 2 March 2022
- Maximum wind gust: Unspecified
- Lowest pressure: Unspecified
- Fatalities: 0
- Power outages: Unspecified
- Damage: Undetermined

Storm Bianca was named on 25 February by the Italian meteorological service, and later affected Greece from 26 to 28 February.

=== Storm Filippos ===
Storm Filippos
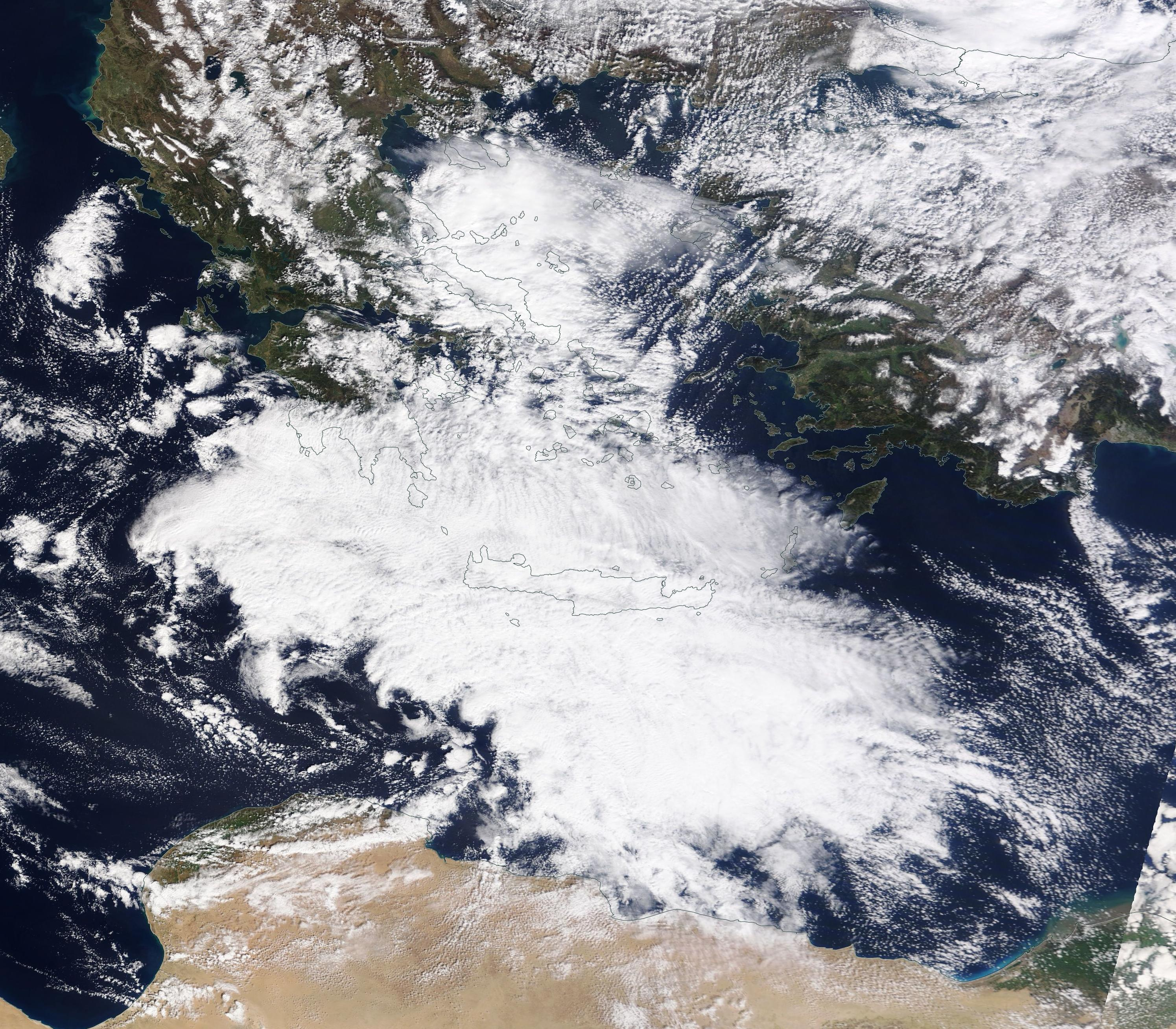

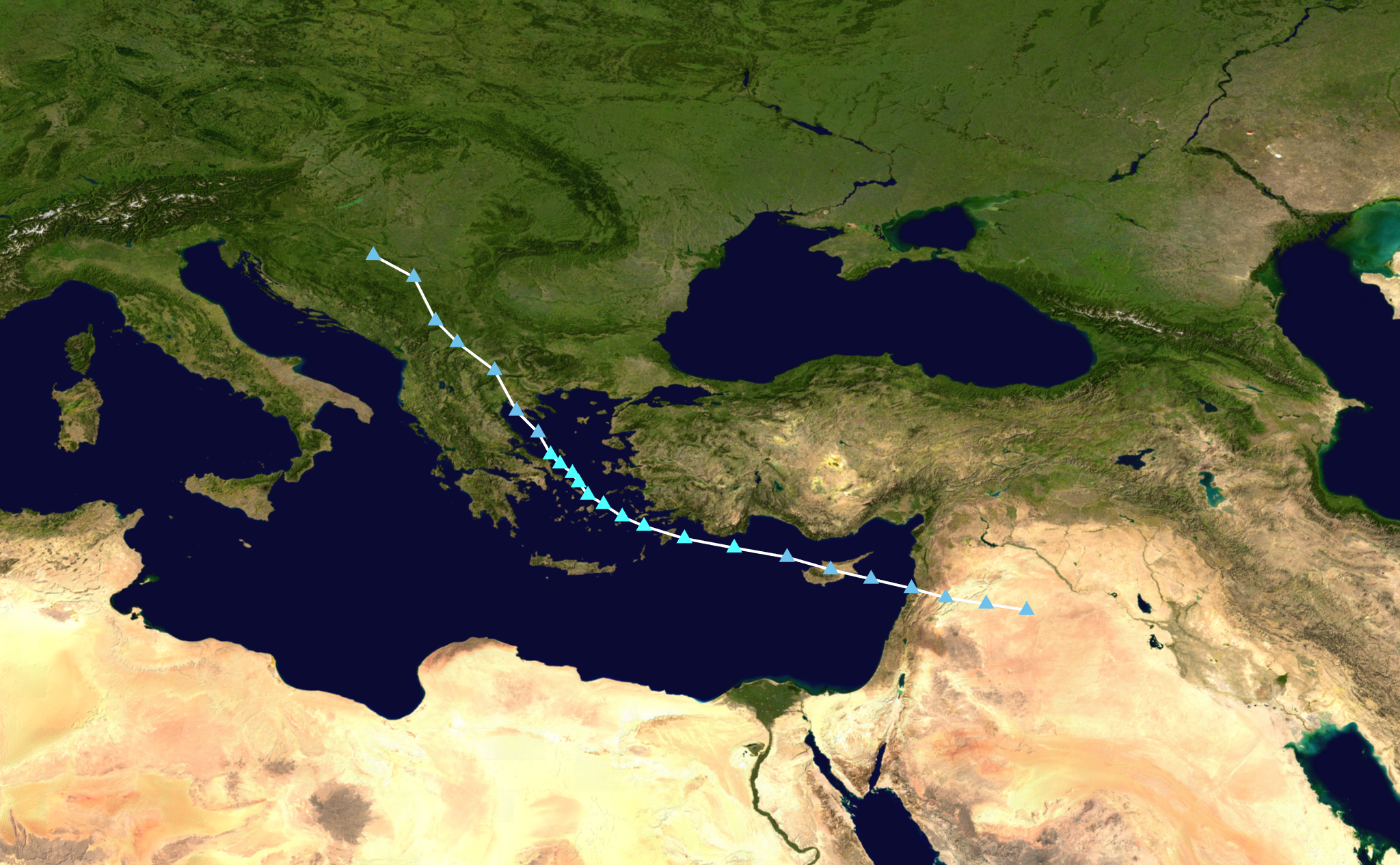
- Area affected: Greece, Turkey
- Date of impact: 8–13 March 2022
- Maximum wind gust: Unspecified
- Lowest pressure: Unspecified
- Fatalities: 0
- Power outages: Unspecified
- Damage: Undetermined

Storm Filippos was named on 8 March by the Greek meteorological service. The storm was characterized by a cold wave and snowfall in Greece. On 13 March the lowest temperature recorded was -16,8 °C at Mavrolithari.

=== Storm Celia ===
Storm Celia
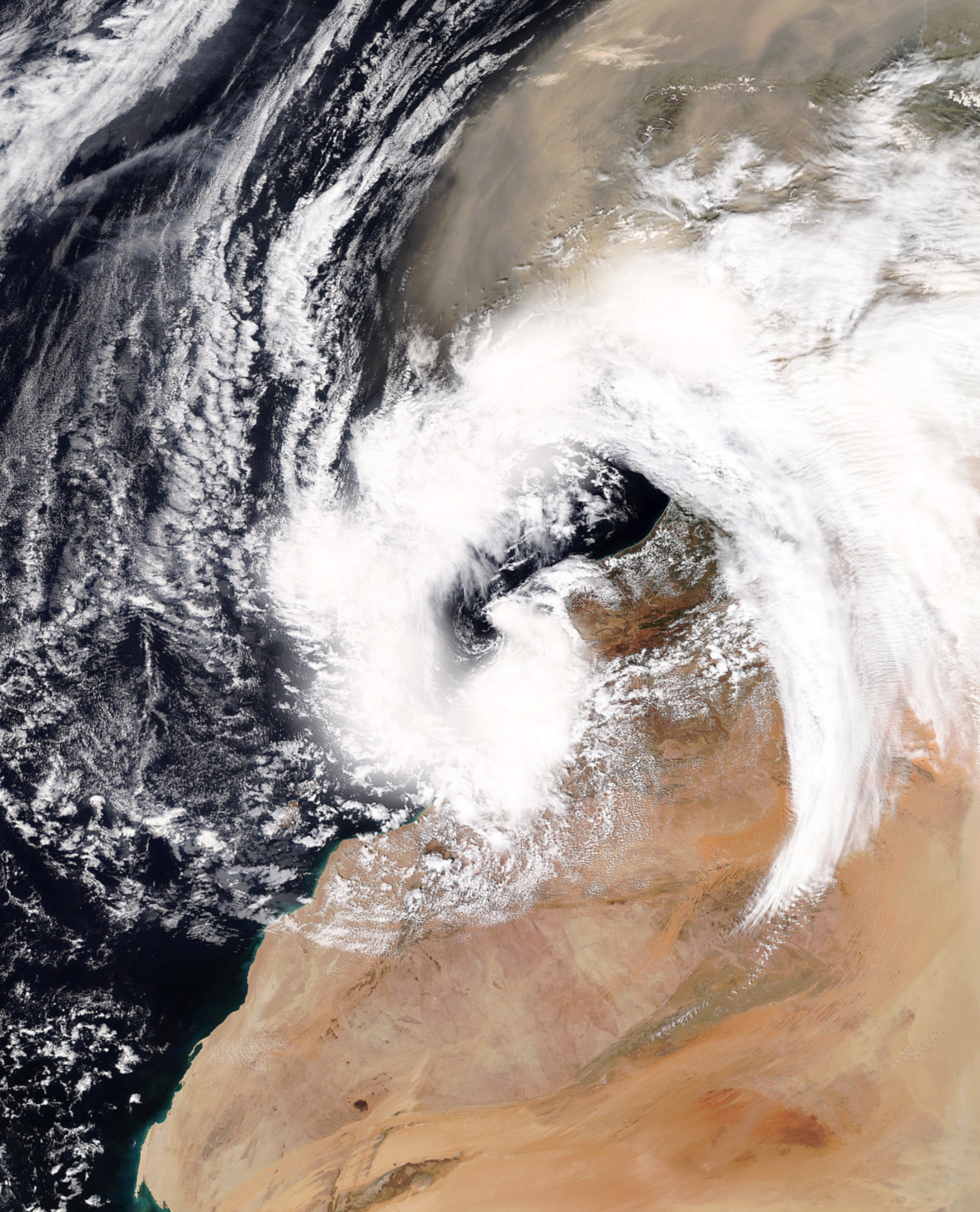

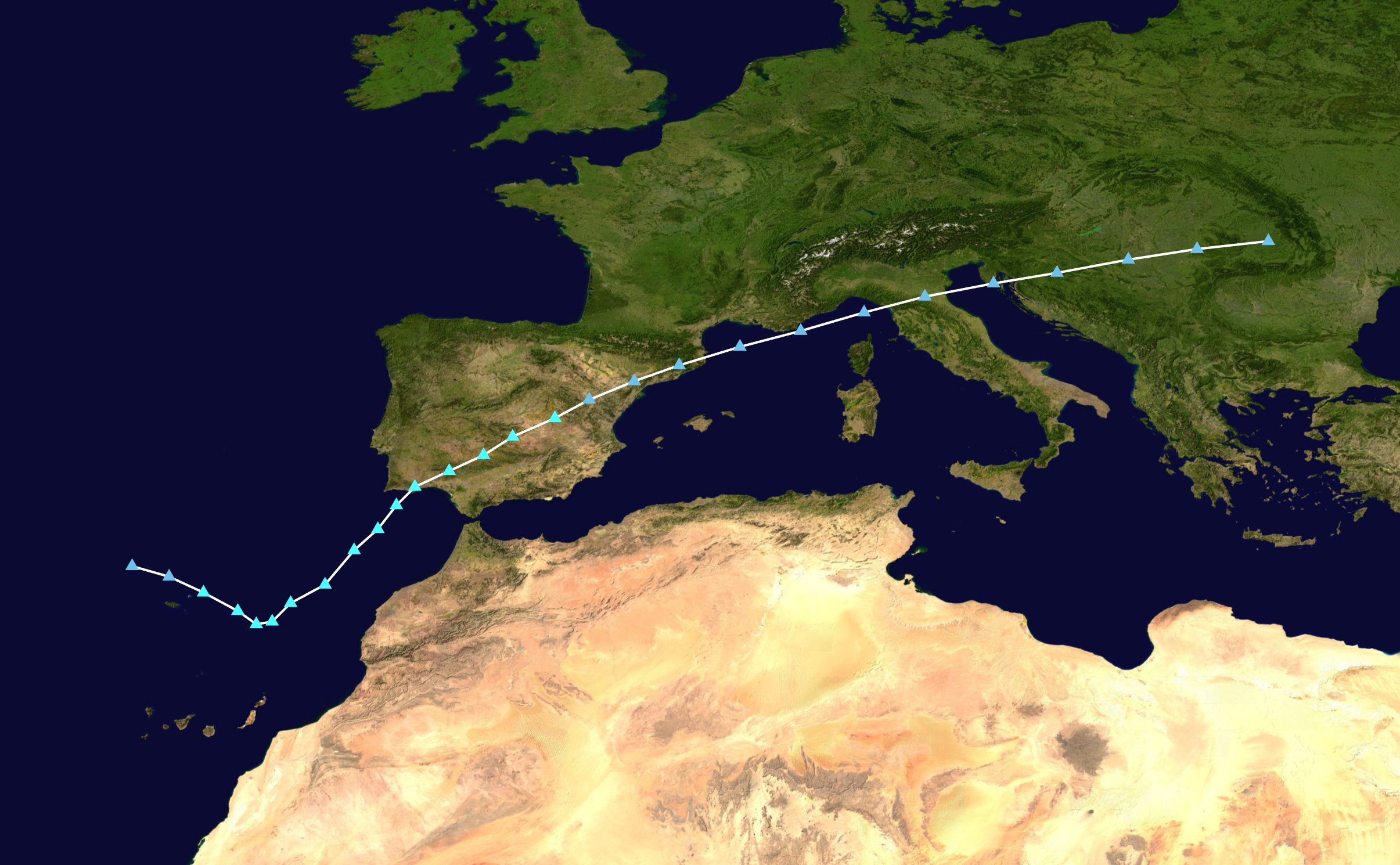
- Area affected: Portugal, Spain, Morocco, Tunisia, Libya
- Date of impact: 13 – 19 March 2022
- Maximum wind gust: Unspecified
- Lowest pressure: Unspecified
- Fatalities: 0
- Power outages: Unspecified
- Damage: Undetermined

Storm Celia was named on 13 March because of its impacts across Portugal, Spain and Morocco, including heavy rain and accumulation of Saharan dust in parts of Spain, causing yellow skies. The same system was named Elke by Germany's FUB.

The Saharan dust was deposited as far north as south-eastern England due to storm being centered over north Africa and the anti-cyclonic winds carrying the sand north.

=== Storm Ciril (Katharina) ===
Storm Ciril
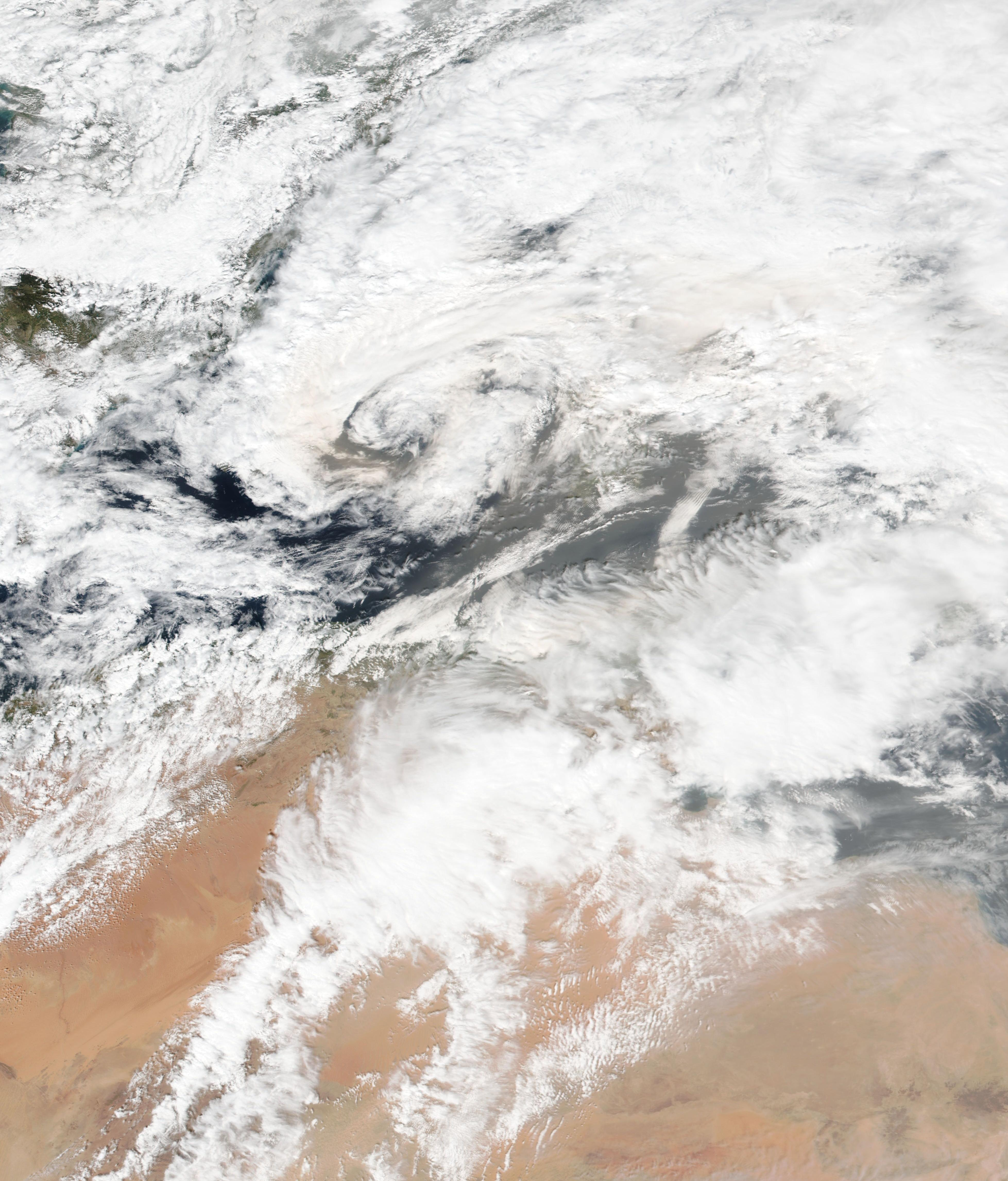
- Area affected: Spain, Italy, Tunisia, Morocco, Montenegro
- Date of impact: 30 March 2022 – 5 April 2022
- Maximum wind gust: Unspecified
- Lowest pressure: 989 hPa (29.2 inHg)
- Fatalities: 0
- Power outages: Unspecified
- Damage: Undetermined

Storm Ciril was named on 30 March. Also named Katharina by the FUB, it affected southern Europe and the Adriatic coast.

Ciril brought snow and heavy wind to Spain, with some areas of the country reporting the coldest April morning in 40 years.

=== Storm Diego ===
Storm Diego
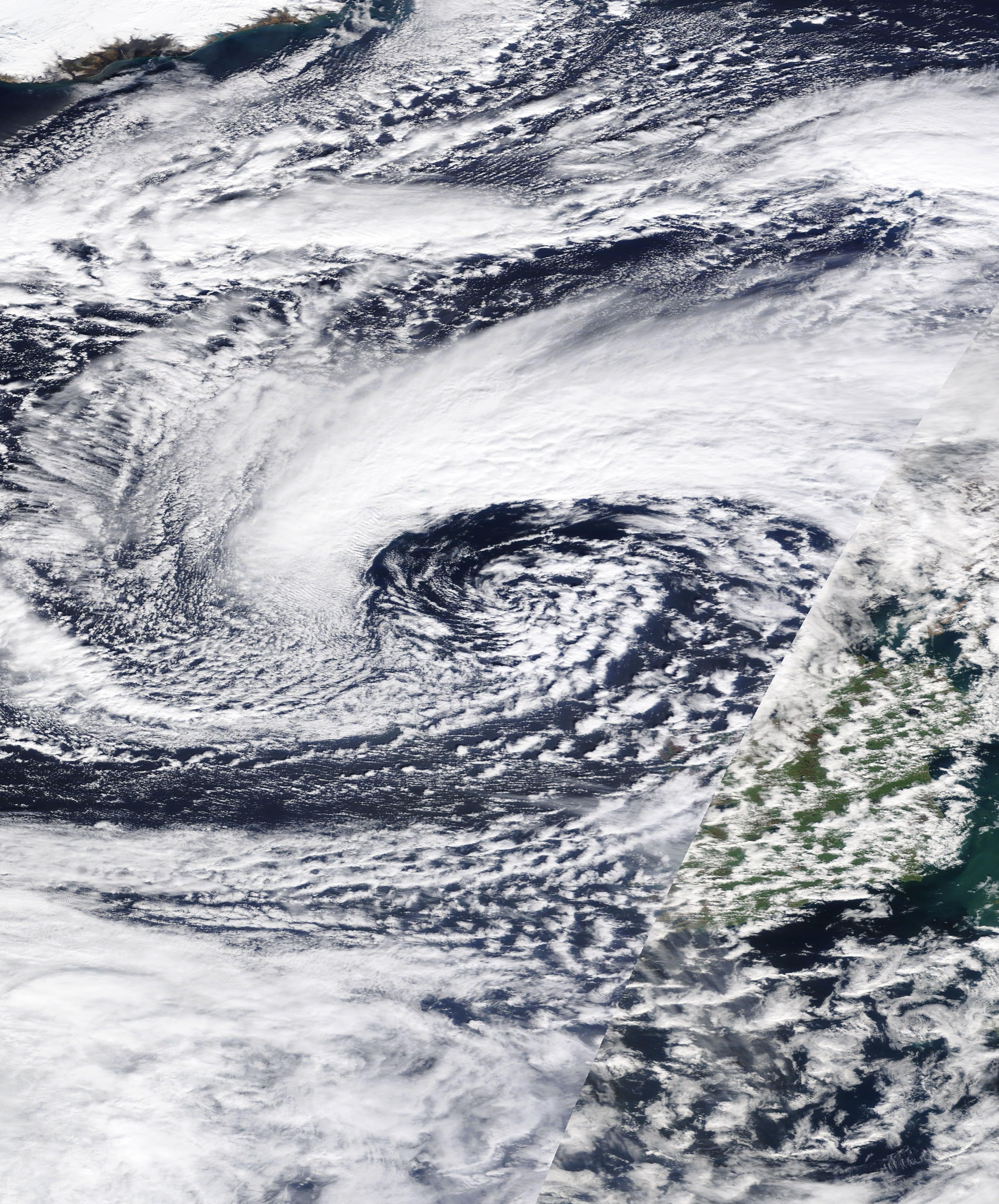
- Area affected: Portugal, Spain, France, Belgium, Germany, Austria, Czech Republic
- Date of impact: 6 – 12 April 2022
- Maximum wind gust: 118 km/h (73 mph; 64 kn)
- Lowest pressure: 993 hPa (29.3 inHg)
- Fatalities: Unspecified
- Power outages: Undetermined
- Damage: Undetermined

Storm Diego was named on 6 April by Météo-France. It did not impact Portugal directly but is expected to bring heavy rain and strong winds to parts of the Iberian Peninsula and France, with the latter expecting gusts of 120 kph from the storm. The same system was named Ortrud by the FUB.

=== Storm Evelyn ===
Storm Evelyn
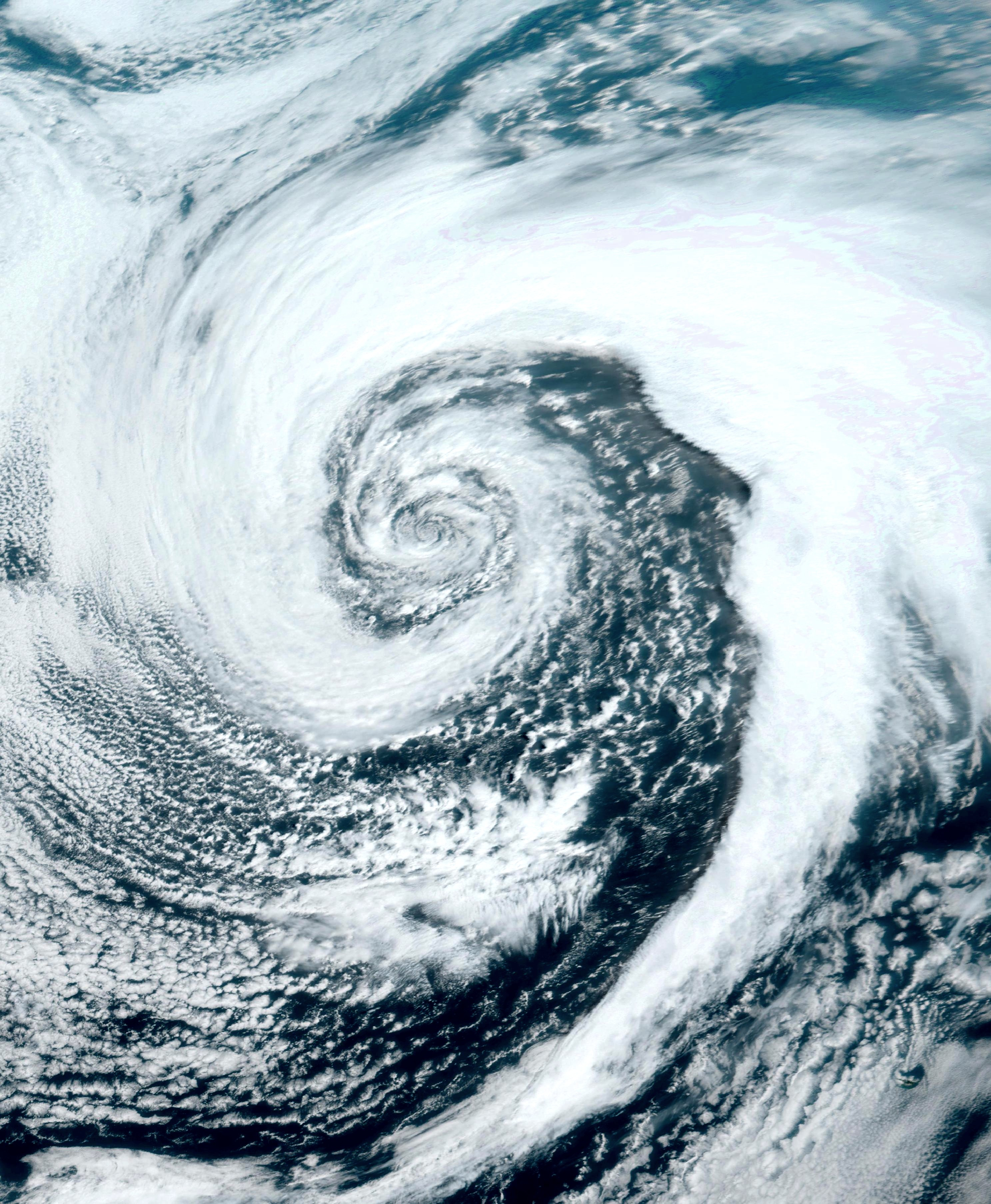
- Area affected: Portugal, Ireland, United Kingdom
- Date of impact: 7–13 April 2022
- Maximum wind gust: 195 km/h (121 mph; 105 kn)
- Lowest pressure: 960 hPa (28 inHg)
- Fatalities: Unspecified
- Power outages: Undetermined
- Damage: Undetermined

Storm Evelyn was named on 7 April by Portugal's weather bureau, the Instituto Português do Mar e da Atmosfera. Storm Evelyn was expected to impact mainland Portugal on 10 April bringing gusty conditions as well as heavy rainfall on 10 and 11 April. The storm, which was named Pamela by FUB, was also expected to affect Ireland and UK.

=== Storm Genesis ===
Storm Genesis
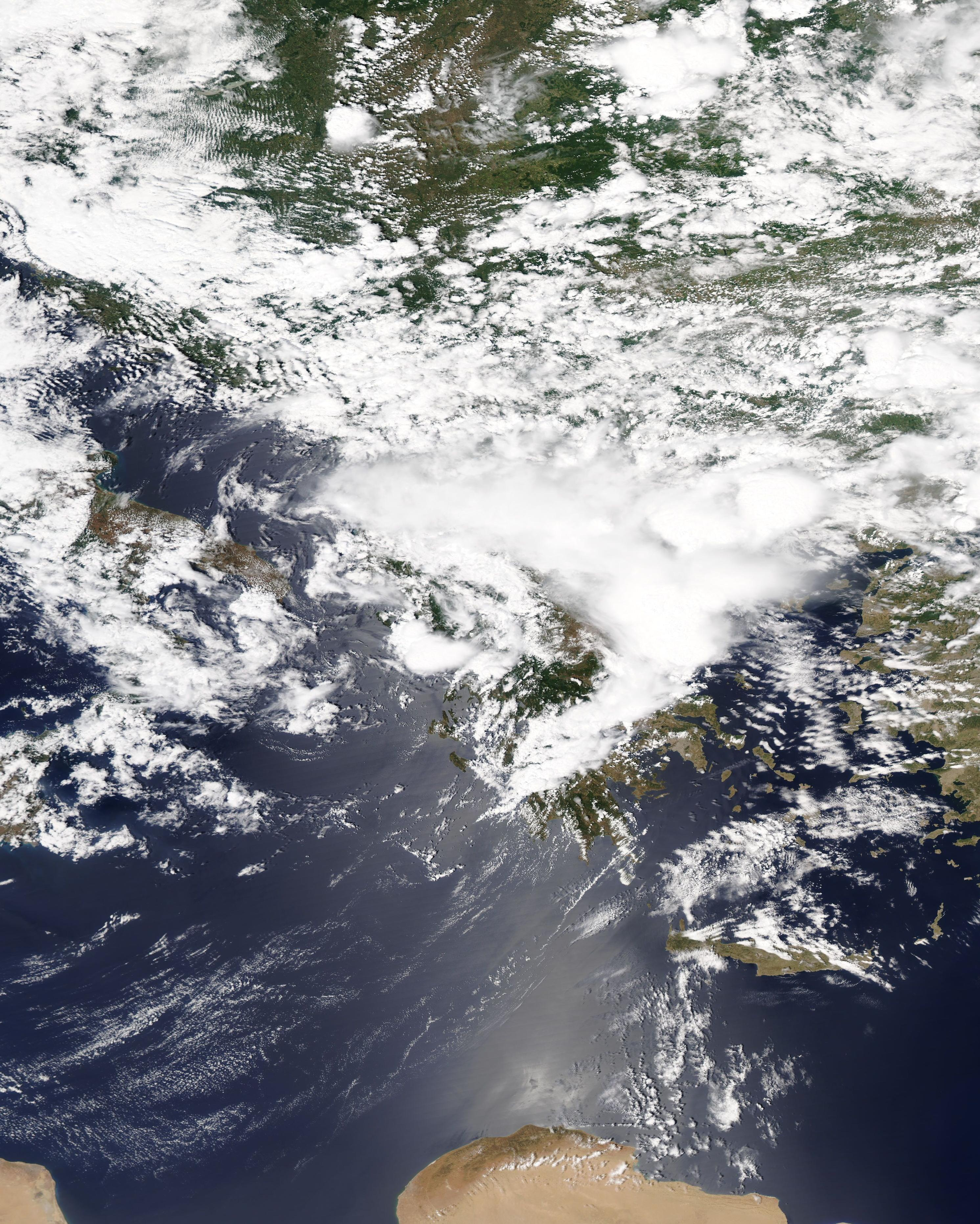
- Area affected: Greece, Italy, North Macedonia, Albania
- Date of impact: 9–15 June 2022
- Maximum wind gust: Unspecified
- Lowest pressure: Unspecified
- Fatalities: Unspecified
- Power outages: Undetermined
- Damage: Undetermined

Storm Genesis was named on 9 June 2022 by Greek meteorological service. According to an Emergency Report of Dangerous Weather Phenomena released on Thursday by the national meteorological service, the low pressure front now over Italy is moving southeast and will affect western, central, and northern Greece from Thursday into Saturday with strong rain and storms accompanied by hail, lightning, and strong winds.

=== Storm Diana ===
Storm Diana
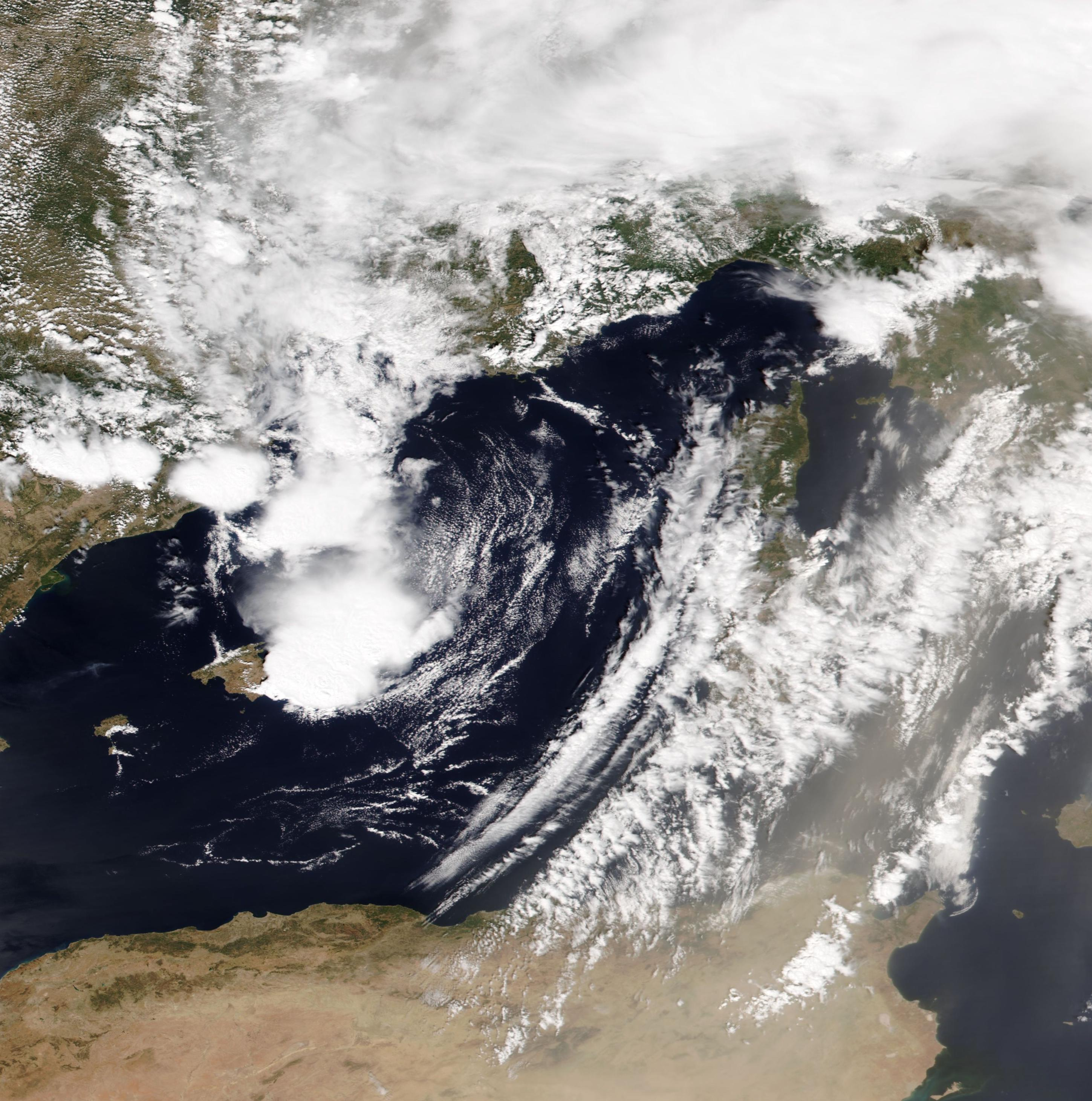
- Storm Diana on 18 August
- Area affected: Italy
- Date of impact: 17–20 August 2022
- Maximum wind gust: Unspecified
- Lowest pressure: Unspecified
- Fatalities: Unspecified
- Power outages: Undetermined
- Damage: Undetermined

Named by the CNMCA on 17 August, Diana had minor impacts. With it dissipating on 20 August.

== Other systems ==
- On 23–24 September, a storm named "Tim" by the Free University of Berlin (FUB) caused the death of two people in Germany and Poland.
- In early November 2021, the remnants of Atlantic Tropical Storm Wanda were absorbed into the cold front of a mid-latitude storm, called "Stephane" by the FUB, moving towards the United Kingdom and Ireland. On 9 November, Stephane affected the Northern European Countries and caused heavy snowfall and rainfall.
- On 19 November, a storm called "Volker" by FUB moved across Poland, killing one and injuring two. One person remains missing.
- Strong gusts up to 130 km/h (36 m/s) connected to the passage of the cold front of a system named "Benedikt" by the FUB caused severe damage in Istanbul. Damage also occurred in other parts of Turkey, Greece, Ukraine and parts of Russia. Two people have been injured in Sevastopol, Ukraine. At least seven people died in Turkey and 46 got injured.
- On 1 December, a storm named "Daniel" by the FUB moved across northern Germany, killing one person.
- On 11 January, Storm Gyda formed and affected Norway. This storm was named "Elsa" by the FUB.

== Season effects ==
Storm	Dates active	Highest wind gust	Lowest pressure	Fatalities (+missing)	Damage	Affected areas
Athina	4 – 9 October 2021	Unknown	1,006 hPa (29.7 inHg)	None	> €70 million	Greece, Italy
Ballos	13 – 16 October 2021	Unknown	1,005 hPa (29.7 inHg)	2	Unknown	Greece
Aurore	20 – 23 October 2021	175 km/h (109 mph; 94 kn)	970 hPa (29 inHg)	6	€25,000	United Kingdom, France, Czech Republic, Poland, Netherlands, Germany and Russia
Apollo	24 October – 2 November 2021	104 km/h (65 mph; 56 kn)	994.4 hPa (29.36 inHg)	6 (2 missing)	€250 million	Italy, Tunisia, Algeria, Malta, Libya, Turkey
Blas	5 – 18 November 2021	140 km/h (87 mph; 76 kn)	1,010 hPa (30 inHg)	9	Unknown	Algeria, Balearic Islands and the east coast of Spain, South of France, Morocco, Sardinia, Sicily
Arwen	25 – 27 November 2021	177 km/h (110 mph; 96 kn)	973 hPa (28.7 inHg)	3	Unknown	United Kingdom, Republic of Ireland, France,
Barra	5 – 9 December 2021	156 km/h (97 mph; 84 kn)	957 hPa (28.3 inHg)	3	Unknown	United Kingdom, Republic of Ireland, France, Spain
Carmel	16 – 22 December 2021	107 km/h (66 mph);58kn)	Unknown	4	Unknown	Greece, Israel, Cyprus
Diomedes	10 – 14 January 2022	Unknown	1,010 hPa (30 inHg)	1 (+1 missing)	Unknown	Greece
Elpis	21 – 27 January 2022	110 km/h (68 mph);59kn)	1,010 hPa (30 inHg)	3	Unknown	Cyprus, Greece, Israel, Turkey
Malik	28 – 30 January 2022	236 km/h (147 mph; 127 kn)	965 hPa (28.5 inHg)	7	£320 Million	Republic of Ireland, United Kingdom, Denmark, Sweden, Norway, Finland, Germany, Lithuania, Latvia, Estonia, Poland, Czech Republic, Slovakia
Corrie	29 – 31 January 2022	150 km/h (93 mph; 81 kn)	1,005 hPa (29.7 inHg)	None	Unknown	Republic of Ireland, United Kingdom, Netherlands
Dudley	14 – 19 February 2022	Unknown	965 hPa (28.5 inHg)	9	> €794 million	United Kingdom, Germany, Poland, Lithuania, The Netherlands, Czech Republic
Eunice	14 – 20 February 2022	196 km/h (122 mph; 106 kn)	960 hPa (28 inHg)	18	> €1.83 billion	Republic of Ireland, United Kingdom, Netherlands, Belgium, Germany, Poland, Lithuania, Russia, Belarus
Franklin	20 – 22 February 2022	Unknown	952 hPa (28.1 inHg)	2	€693 million	Republic of Ireland, United Kingdom, France, The Netherlands, Germany
Bianca	25 February–2 March 2022	Unknown	Unknown	None	Unknown	Italy, Greece
Filippos	8– 13 March 2022	Unknown	Unknown	None	Unknown	Turkey, Greece
Celia	13–19 March 2022	Unknown	Unknown	None	Unknown	Portugal, Spain, Morocco, Tunisia, Libya
Ciril	30 March–5 April 2022	Unknown	989 hPa (29.2 inHg)	None	Unknown	Spain, Italy, Tunisia, Morocco, Montenegro
Diego	6–12 April 2022	118 km/h (73 mph; 64 kn)	993 hPa (29.3 inHg)	None	Unknown	Portugal, Spain, France, Belgium, Germany, Austria, Czech Republic
Evelyn	7–13 April 2022	195 km/h (121 mph; 105 kn)	960 hPa (28 inHg)	None	Unknown	Portugal, Republic of Ireland, United Kingdom
Genesis	9–15 June 2022	Unknown	1,004 hPa (29.6 inHg)	None	Unknown	Greece, Italy, North Macedonia, Albania
Diana	17–20 August 2022	Unknown	Unknown	Unknown	Unknown	Italy

== Coordination of storms named by European meteorological services ==
2021–22 named storms table (dates of impact and/or when warnings are issued for, not cyclone duration)
Tim (FUB), 23–24 September 2021
Athina (Gre), Christian (FUB), 2–10 October 2021
Ballos (Gre), 13–16 October 2021
Aurore (Fr), Hendrik (FUB), 16–23 October 2021
Apollo (It), Nearchus (Gre) 24 October–2 November 2021
Blas (Es), 5–14 November 2021
Stephane (FUB), which absorbed the moisture of the remnants of Tropical Storm Wanda, 9 November 2021
Volker (FUB), 19 November 2021
Arwen (UK), Andreas (FUB), 25–28 November 2021
Benedikt (FUB), 28–30 November 2021
Daniel (FUB), 1–3 December 2021
Barra (IRE), Harry (FUB), 5–9 December 2021
Carmel (Gre), 16–22 December 2021
Diomedes (Gre), Doreen (FUB), 10–14 January 2022
Gyda (No), Elsa (FUB) 11–14 January 2022 (an atmospheric river event).
Elpis (Gre), 21–27 January 2022
Malik (Dk), Valtteri (Fi), Nadia (FUB), 28–30 January 2022
Corrie (UK), Odette (FUB), 29–31 January 2022
Dudley (UK), Ylenia (FUB), 14–19 February 2022
Eunice (UK), Zeynep (FUB), Nora (Dk), 14–20 February 2022
Franklin (UK), Antonia (FUB), 20–22 February 2022
Bianca (It), 25 February–2 March 2022
Filippos (Gre), 8–13 March 2022
Celia (Es), Elke (FUB), 13–19 March 2022
Ciril (It), Katharina (FUB), 30 March–5 April 2022
Diego (Fr), Ortrud (FUB), 6–12 April 2022
Evelyn (Pt), Pamela (FUB), 7–13 April 2022
Genesis (Gre), 9–15 June 2022
Diana (It), 17–20 August 2022

== See also ==
- Weather of 2021
- Weather of 2022
- List of historical European windstorm names
