= Royal Meteorological Institute =

Belgian research institute

Royal Meteorological Institute of Belgium (RMI)
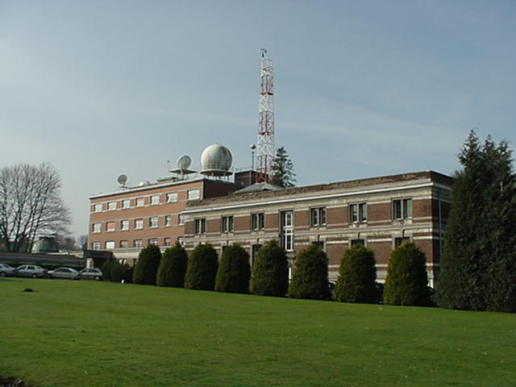
- Established: 31 July 1913; 112 years ago
- Staff: 200 (2012)
- Location: Ringlaan/Avenue Circulaire 3, 1180 Ukkel/Uccle
- Website: www.meteo.be

The Royal Meteorological Institute of Belgium (French: Institut Royal Météorologique de Belgique or IRM; Dutch: Koninklijk Meteorologisch Instituut van België or KMI) is a Belgian federal institute engaged in scientific research in the field of meteorology. The RMI depends on the Belgian Federal Science Policy Office (BELSPO). The institute is a member of the World Meteorological Organization, of the European Centre for Medium-Range Weather Forecasts, of EUMETSAT, and of the EIG Eumetnet.

== History ==
In 1823, Adolphe Quetelet obtains from the Minister of Public Education the creation of an astronomical Observatory in Brussels. Meanwhile, are the first meteorological observations done with rudimentary instruments. In 1876, Jean-Charles Houzeau de Lehaie becomes the new director of the Observatory. Quickly, he plans to move the Observatory from the site of Sint-Joost-ten-Node to Ukkel, as well as making from astronomy and meteorology two separate departments. On 1 September 1876 the first Belgian weather forecast was edited, based on the analysis of a synoptic map. In April 1903, the first weather balloon was launched, in order to obtain meteorological observations at a higher altitude. On 31 July 1913 the meteorological service of the Observatory becomes an autonomous institute under the name of Royal Meteorological Institute (RMI). Jean Vincent is its first director. From 1914 until 1918, during the German occupation, the RMI stops all activities. It was bombed on 20 August 1914 and rebuilt at the beginning of 1919. In 1919, Jules Jaumotte, astronomer, aviator from World War I and pioneer in the aerial photography, becomes director of the RMI and focuses on the possibility to realize atmospheric soundings in real time. Those new approaches in the study of atmosphere lead to a new science, the synoptic Aerology. In this context, during Belgium's participation to the International Polar Year in 1932–1933, Jules Jaumotte performs automatic cloud photographs at high altitude by balloons, with a method that links the functioning of instruments to their altitude level. During World War II, the institute was used by the Nazis as a military observatory and was destroyed by the English troops in 1944. In 1956, the RMI inaugurates the Geophysical Center of Dourbes, which studies magnetism and atmospheric electricity among other fields of research.

== Technological evolution ==
In the 1990s and under the directorate of Henri Malcorps, the RMI started using several new technologies such as the installation in 1992 of a lightning detection system by radio interferometry (SAFIR). It is able to localize every impact of lightning throughout Belgium in real time, with an accuracy of about 1 km. Another example is, in 1993, when the RMI launched a meteorological database easily accessible with a computer: MeteoBBS. This system allows the display of satellite photos, meteorological radar pictures, the SAFIR maps, as well as all observations, weather forecasts and meteorological warnings. The scientific technology is quickly evolving and, in 1995, the METEOSAT satellite localized at 36.000 km above the Earth provided the first high quality images every half-hour. In 2001, the Royal Meteorological Institute acquired a brand new radar able to measure all kind of precipitation within a range of 240 km. It is located in Libramont, in the province of Luxembourg. Dr. Henri Malcorps retired in 2010, and Dr. Daniel Gellens has since then been the director ad interim of the RMI.

== Today ==
The RMI is located in Uccle, in a site shared with the Royal Observatory of Belgium and the Belgian Institute for Space Aeronomy. Among other remarkable places on site, the climatological park of the RMI is the reference in Belgium for climatology. Under the authority of BELSPO, the RMI makes its priority in providing meteorological warnings to the Belgian population, along with the European organization Meteoalarm. The Institute gives daily weather forecasts to the public and to a few specific sectors including agriculture, transport, media and energy. Moreover, the RMI publishes a monthly climatological report, containing for every day of the previous month data on wind speed, average/minimum/maximum temperature, precipitation, insolation. It is entirely free and accessible through the RMI website. The current face of RMI reflects the importance given to scientific meteorological research, in the fields of forecasting, issues concerning atmosphere and climate, the hydrological cycle, observations' systems, magnetism and the ionosphere.

== Tools and collaboration ==
The Institute operates a network of meteorological stations, radars, lightning detection system, and satellite measurements across Belgium. The RMI also takes part in the elaboration of numerous projects, like the Solar Impulse, a plane that functions on solar energy. The Royal Meteorological Institute works together with IRCELINE and the Federal Public Service Health in order to warn the population about potential ozone peaks and heat waves.
