= Weather warning =

Alert issued by a meteorological agency

A weather warning or weather alert is issued by a meteorological agency to warn citizens of approaching dangerous weather. A weather watch, on the other hand, typically refers to an alert issued to indicate that conditions are favorable for the development of dangerous weather patterns, although the dangerous weather conditions themselves are not currently present.

== Australia ==
The Bureau of Meteorology is responsible for issuing weather warnings in Australia. The Bureau's warnings can be separated into severe thunderstorm warnings and severe weather warnings. Severe thunderstorm warnings are issued when either a severe thunderstorm is reported or if existing thunderstorms are expected to become severe. Severe weather warnings are issued when severe weather is occurring or expected in an area, which are not solely related to severe thunderstorms.

== Canada ==
In Canada, governmental weather warnings and watches are issued by the Environment Canada. Environment Canada defines an advisory as "an alert to cover a wide array of deteriorating weather conditions," a watch as "when conditions favour that severe weather forming" and a warning as "severe weather is actually occurring or is imminent." Additionally, Environment Canada breaks down weather alerts based upon the specific type of hazardous weather. These alerts are regionally issued throughout Canada and include, but are not limited to, winter storms, extreme temperature(including tornadoes), wind, tsunami, tropical cyclones, and extreme precipitation amounts.

== New Zealand ==
MetService is the National Meteorological Service of New Zealand, and is designated by the Minister of Transport to provide New Zealand's authorised meteorological warning service. MetService issues Severe Weather Outlooks, Watches and Warnings under a Code of Practice that enables others to distribute this information in the national interest. Like the United States NWS, MetService breaks down weather warnings and watches based on the specific type of hazardous weather – heavy rain, heavy snow, severe gales, and other weather likely to cause significant disruption to the general public or specific industry groups. MetService also provides Severe Thunderstorm Outlooks, Watches, and Warnings to deal with heavy rain and strong wind gusts caused by thunderstorms, as well as large hail and damaging tornadoes.

== Philippines ==
In the Philippines, the Philippine Atmospheric, Geophysical and Astronomical Services Administration (PAGASA) issues rainfall advisories, thunderstorm advisories, gale warnings, flood warnings, and tropical cyclone wind signals.

== Europe ==
In Europe, public weather warnings are issued by national meteorological services. Their presentation is partly harmonised through EUMETNET's European Multi-service Meteorological Awareness (EMMA) initiative and the MeteoAlarm portal. MeteoAlarm aggregates official national warnings and displays them using shared pictograms and a four-level colour scale (green, yellow, orange, red) to support consistent cross-border interpretation. The underlying warning criteria and meteorological thresholds remain national and therefore vary by climate and local vulnerability.

=== Netherlands ===
The alerts are issued by the Royal Netherlands Meteorological Institute (KNMI) when an extreme weather situation threatens to develop, in which the public safety and societal order is imminently disrupted. The warnings are issued in three tiers: codes yellow, orange and red. Preliminary warnings can be issued up to 72 hours in advance.

Only when the data is 90% certain that the weather will be dangerous, the KNMI issues a code red alert. In those situations, inter-agency safety region will be mobilised alongside the ANWB and Rijkswaterstaat (RWS). NL-Alert is issued when there is immediate danger to the public, upon the consultation between KNMI, ANWB, and the RWS.

=== Sweden ===
The Swedish Meteorological and Hydrological Institute uses terminology based on other countries. Yellow level means forecast of weather that can mean some risks and disturbances to transport and other parts of society. Amber level is for weather that can mean danger, damage, and larger disturbances. Red level is for weather that can mean big danger, serious damage, and major disturbances. This can refer to many types of weather related events such as wind, flooding, snow, forest fires, etc. Sweden does not have as severe weather as some other countries, so red events in Sweden would normally not cause large international headlines.

Until 2021 the SMHI its own warning level terminology, Class 1, 2 and 3, fairly much corresponding to Yellow, Amber and Red.

=== United Kingdom ===
The Met Office, the United Kingdom's national weather service, does not issue separate weather warnings and watches, but has an analogous system of flash warnings and advance warnings that serve the same general role of weather warnings and weather watches, respectively. Other official meteorological departments may use similar systems but use different terms.

The Met Office and other weather services have three colour coded warning levels:

- Yellow: Be aware. Possible travel delays, or the disruption of your day-to-day activities.
- Amber: Be prepared. Could cause road and rail closures, interruption to power, and the potential risk to life and property.
- Red: Take action. Widespread damage, travel and power disruption, and risk to life are likely. Avoid dangerous areas.

Thunderstorm warnings both Severe and Watch are also issued as of 2018.

== United States ==
In the United States, governmental weather warnings and watches are issued by the National Weather Service, which is itself a branch of the National Oceanic and Atmospheric Administration. The NWS defines a watch as "the risk of hazardous weather or hydrologic event [increasing] significantly, but its occurrence, location, and/or timing is still uncertain" and a warning as "hazardous weather or hydrologic event [that] is occurring, is imminent, or has a very high probability of occurring". Additionally, the NWS breaks down weather warnings and watches based upon the specific type of hazardous weather. These warnings and watches include, but are not limited to, flooding, severe local storms, tropical cyclones, and winter storms.

== See also ==
- Meteoalarm
