= Storm Abigail =

2015 storm

- MODIS image of Abigail on 12 November 2015

Meteorological history
- Formed: 7 November 2015
- Dissipated: 15 November 2015

Extratropical cyclone
- Highest gusts: 84 mph (135 km/h) (South Uist, Outer Hebrides)
- Lowest pressure: 964 mb (28.5 inHg)

Overall effects
- Areas affected: Western Canada, Eastern Canada, Northern Europe
- Power outages: 20,000
- Part of the 2015-16 UK and Ireland windstorm season

Storm Abigail was an extratropical cyclone that brought high winds, rain, lightning, and snow across northern Scotland. It is the first ever storm to be officially named by the Met Office of the United Kingdom and Ireland's Met Éireann, being named on 10 November 2015.

== Meteorological history and impacts ==
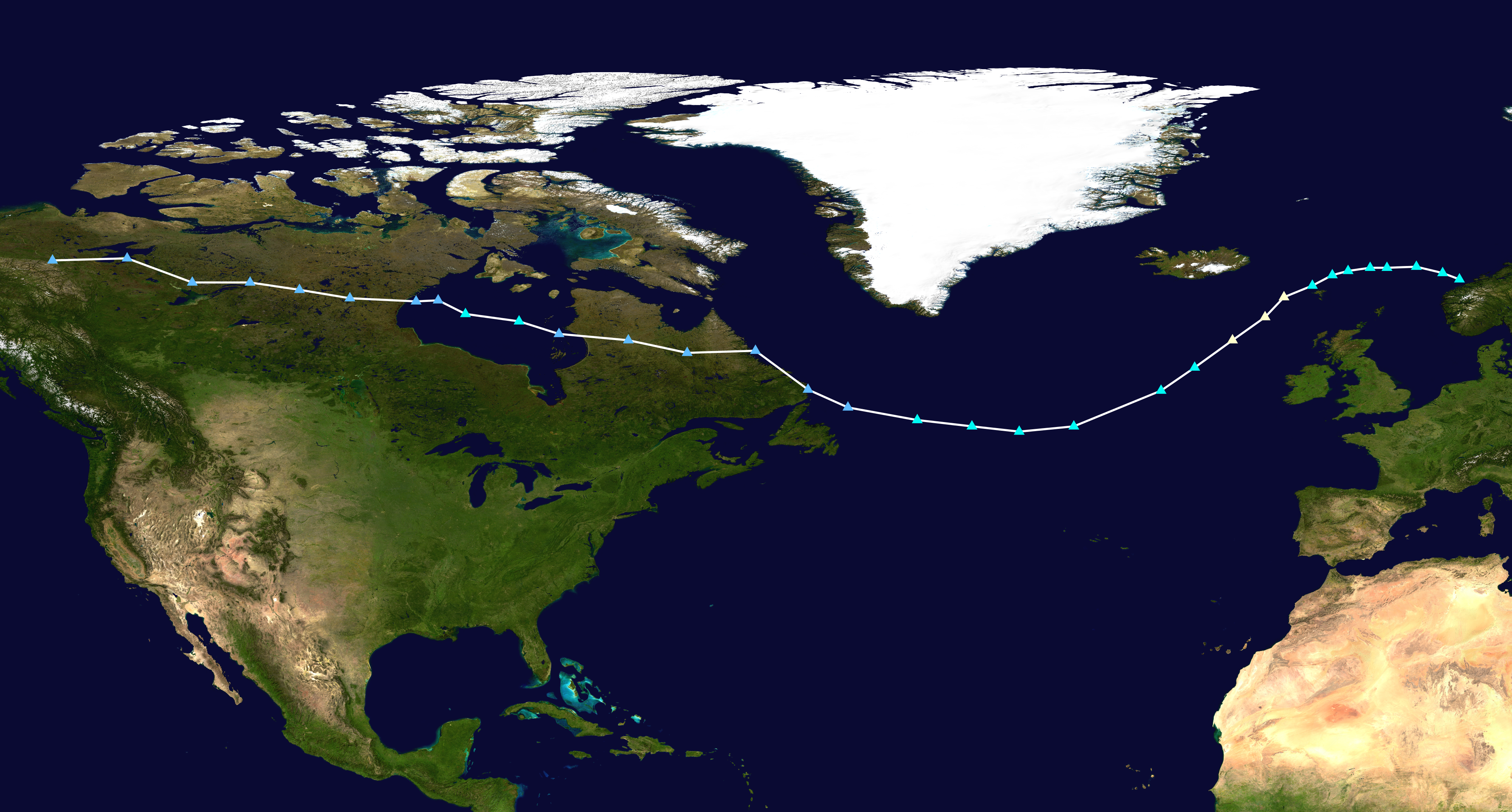
Map plotting the storm's track and intensity, according to the Saffir–Simpson scale Map key Saffir–Simpson scale Tropical depression (≤38 mph, ≤62 km/h) Tropical storm (39–73 mph, 63–118 km/h) Category 1 (74–95 mph, 119–153 km/h) Category 2 (96–110 mph, 154–177 km/h) Category 3 (111–129 mph, 178–208 km/h) Category 4 (130–156 mph, 209–251 km/h) Category 5 (≥157 mph, ≥252 km/h) Unknown Storm type Tropical cyclone Subtropical cyclone Extratropical cyclone, remnant low, tropical disturbance, or monsoon depression

On 10 November, a Chief Meteorologist at the Met Office said: "There remains some uncertainty regarding the exact extent and timing of strongest winds but current forecasts suggest that this storm could have some medium impacts such as disruption to transport and so a warning has been issued and the first storm has been named as Abigail."

On 12 November, local ferries were affected by bad weather with many services cancelled. It was announced that every school in the Western Isles and Shetland were to be closed to pupils on 13 November. The storm left more than 20,000 homes without power, according to energy company SSE.

The Scottish Environment Protection Agency also warned of the risk of flooding due to the storm, as the weather system was anticipated to create a storm surge along the south-west and west coast, due to coincidence with a high tide.

Warning	Force	Information
Amber	11	"Be prepared" weather warning was issued on 11 November for the Western Isles, north west Highlands, parts of Argyll and Orkney. A yellow "be aware" warning was applied to the rest of Scotland.

== Background ==
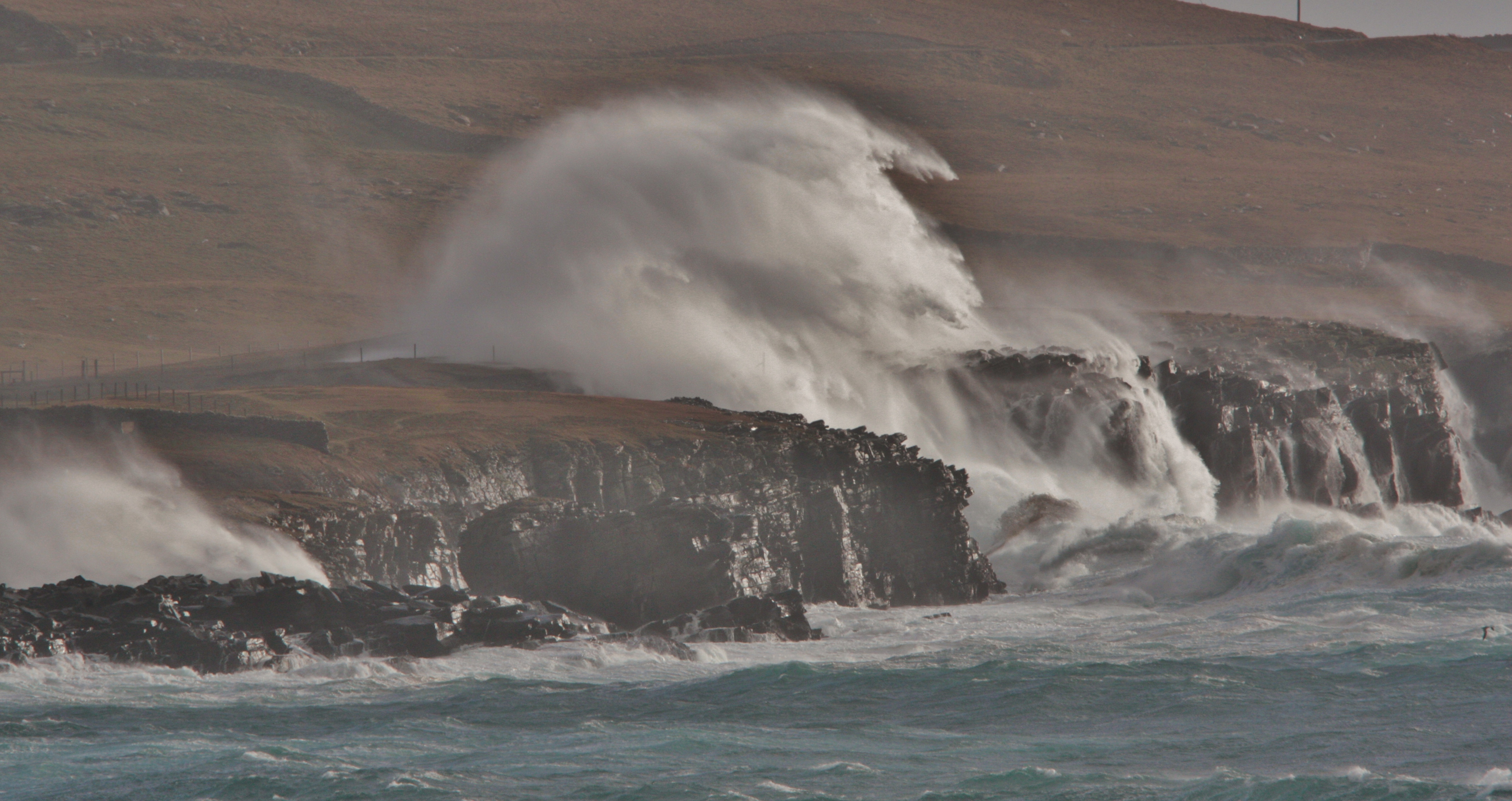
Waves batter Shetland during Storm Abigail (13 November)

Earlier in 2015, the Met Office and Met Éireann announced a pilot project to name wind storms and asked the public for suggestions. The full list of names, common to both the UK and Ireland, were: Abigail, Barney, Clodagh, Desmond, Eva, Frank, Gertrude, Henry, Imogen, Jake, Katie, Lawrence, Mary, Nigel, Orla, Phil, Rhonda, Steve, Tegan, Vernon and Wendy.

A storm will be named when it is deemed able to potentially cause "substantial" impact on the UK or Ireland.

They will be taken from the list, in alphabetical order, alternating between male and female names. This is the same naming convention as that used for tropical cyclones in the United States. Where weather events result from ex-tropical storms or hurricanes, the original name allocated by the National Hurricane Center in the US will be used.

== See also ==
- 2015–16 UK and Ireland windstorm season
- European windstorm
- Weather system naming in Europe
