= Storm naming =

Storm naming may refer to:

- Tropical cyclone naming
- Extratropical cyclone § Terminology
- Weather system naming in Europe
- Winter storm naming in the United States
