= List of storms named Desmond =

The name Desmond has been used for one tropical cyclone and one European windstorm worldwide.

In the South-West Indian Ocean:

- Tropical Storm Desmond (2019) – moderate tropical storm that made landfall in Mozambique

In Europe:

- Storm Desmond (2015) – significant extratropical cyclone that caused major flooding across parts of Ireland and the United Kingdom
