= 2015–16 UK and Ireland windstorm season =

- First storm formed: 12 November 2015
- Last storm dissipated: 28 March 2016
- Strongest storm^{1}: Frank — 928 hPa (27.4 inHg)
- Strongest wind gust: 106 mph (171 km/h; 92 kn) The Needles Old Battery, United Kingdom. (28 March)
- Total storms: 11
- Total damage: ≥ £3.657 billion (≥ €4.047 billion)
- Total fatalities: 7
- ^{1}Strongest storm is determined by lowest pressure and maximum recorded non-mountainous wind gust is also included for reference.

The 2015–16 UK and Ireland windstorm season was the first instance of the United Kingdom's Met Office and Ireland's Met Éireann naming extratropical cyclones. The season started on 10 November with the naming of Storm Abigail and ended on 28 March with the dissipation of Storm Katie. With a total of eleven named storms, the 2015–16 season is the most active to date.

Storms are named when they are forecast to cause hazards due to high winds by either organisation. The season is most notable for the amount of rainfall which fell over the UK and Ireland, causing the 2015–16 Great Britain and Ireland floods; most of which is attributed to Storms Desmond, Eva and Frank. Its strongest low-altitude gusts to hit land came from storms Gertrude and Katie – on 29 January, Gertrude's 105 mph (169 km/h; 91 kn) at Lerwick, Shetland Islands, Scotland and Katie's 106 mph (171 km/h; 92 kn) on 28 March at The Needles Old Battery, the narrow western tip of the Isle of Wight, England.

The season preceded the 2016–17 UK and Ireland windstorm season.

== Background ==
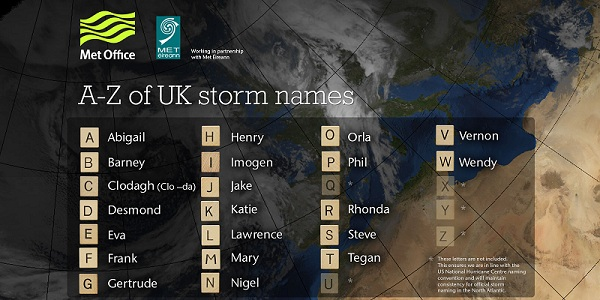
Storm names

Earlier in 2015, the Met Office and Met Éireann announced a pilot project to name wind storms and asked the public for suggestions. The full list of names for 2015, common to both the UK and Ireland, chosen for future selection are:

- Abigail (12–13 November 2015)
- Barney (17–18 November 2015)
- Clodagh (29 November 2015)
- Desmond (4–6 December 2015)
- Eva (23–24 December 2015)
- Frank (29–30 December 2015)
- Gertrude (29 January 2016)
- Henry (1–2 February 2016)
- Imogen (7–8 February 2016)
- Jake (2 March 2016)
- Katie (28 March 2016)
- Lawrence (unused)
- Mary (unused)
- Nigel (unused)
- Orla (unused)
- Phil (unused)
- Rhonda (unused)
- Steve (unused)
- Tegan (unused)
- Vernon (unused)
- Wendy (unused)

A storm will be named when it is deemed able to have a "substantial" impact on the UK or Ireland. They will be taken from the list, in alphabetical order, alternating between male and female names – the same naming convention used by the United States for tropical cyclones. In the case of storms resulting from ex-tropical storms and hurricanes, the original name allocated by the US National Hurricane Center will be used. Met Éireann name any storm which triggers a status orange or red weather warning for wind. The basis for such as outlined on their weather warning service are mean wind speeds in excess of 80 km/h (50 mph; 43 kn) or gusts over 130 km/h (81 mph; 70 kn). Similarly, the Met Office name storms that have the potential to cause medium (orange) or high (red) impacts to the UK. It describes the wind strength relative to observations such as "falling trees or tiles and other items like garden furniture being blown around."

== Seasonal summary ==
Comparison of strongest gusts associated with each storm in the UK and Ireland.

== Storms ==
=== Storm Abigail ===
Abigail
- MODIS image of Abigail on 12 November 2015

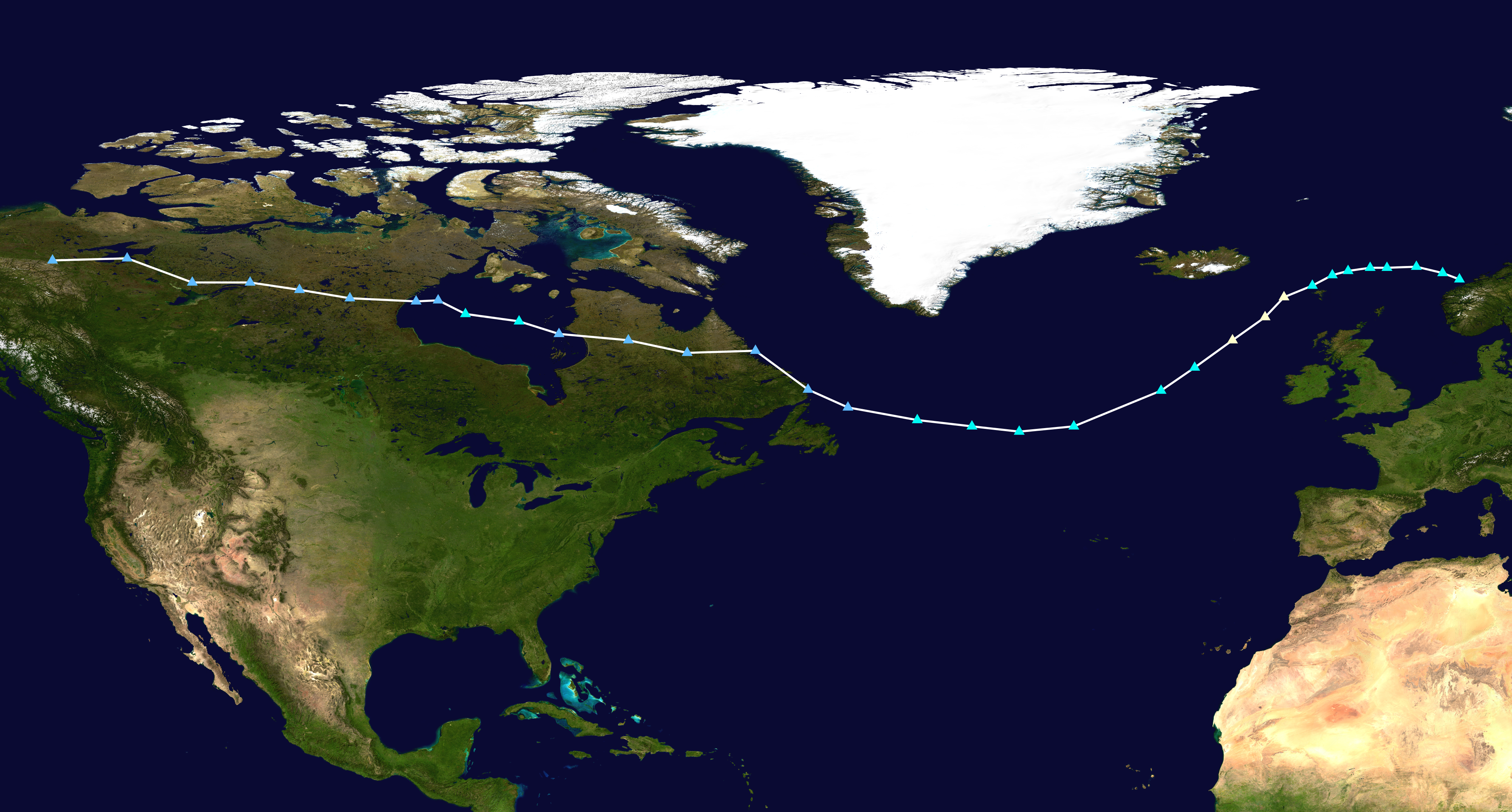
- Date of impact: 12–13 November
- Maximum wind gust: 84 mph (135 km/h; 73 kn) (South Uist, Outer Hebrides)
- Lowest pressure: 964 hPa (28.5 inHg)
- Fatalities: 0
- Power outages: 20,000

Abigail was the first storm to be officially named (jointly) by the Met Office and Met Éireann on 10 November 2015. The Free University of Berlin named the cyclone Frank. A Met Office yellow warning for wind was issues to all of Scotland on 11 November; with amber warnings for the Western Isles, north west Highlands, parts of Argyll and Orkney. Initial forecasts on 12 November from a Chief Meteorologist at the Met Office warned of wind gusts widely reaching 60 and 80 to 90 mph (97 and 129 to 145 km/h; 52 and 70 to 78 kn) in exposed locations. The Scottish Environment Protection Agency also warned of the risk of flooding due to the storm, as the weather system was anticipated to create a storm surge along the south-west and west coast, due to coincidence with a high tide.

Abigail brought high winds, rain, lightning, and wintry showers across the north and northwest of Scotland. On 12 November, local ferries were affected by bad weather with many services cancelled. It was announced that every school in the Western Isles and Shetland were to be closed to pupils on 13 November. The storm left more than 20,000 homes without power, according to energy company SSE.

=== Storm Barney ===
Barney
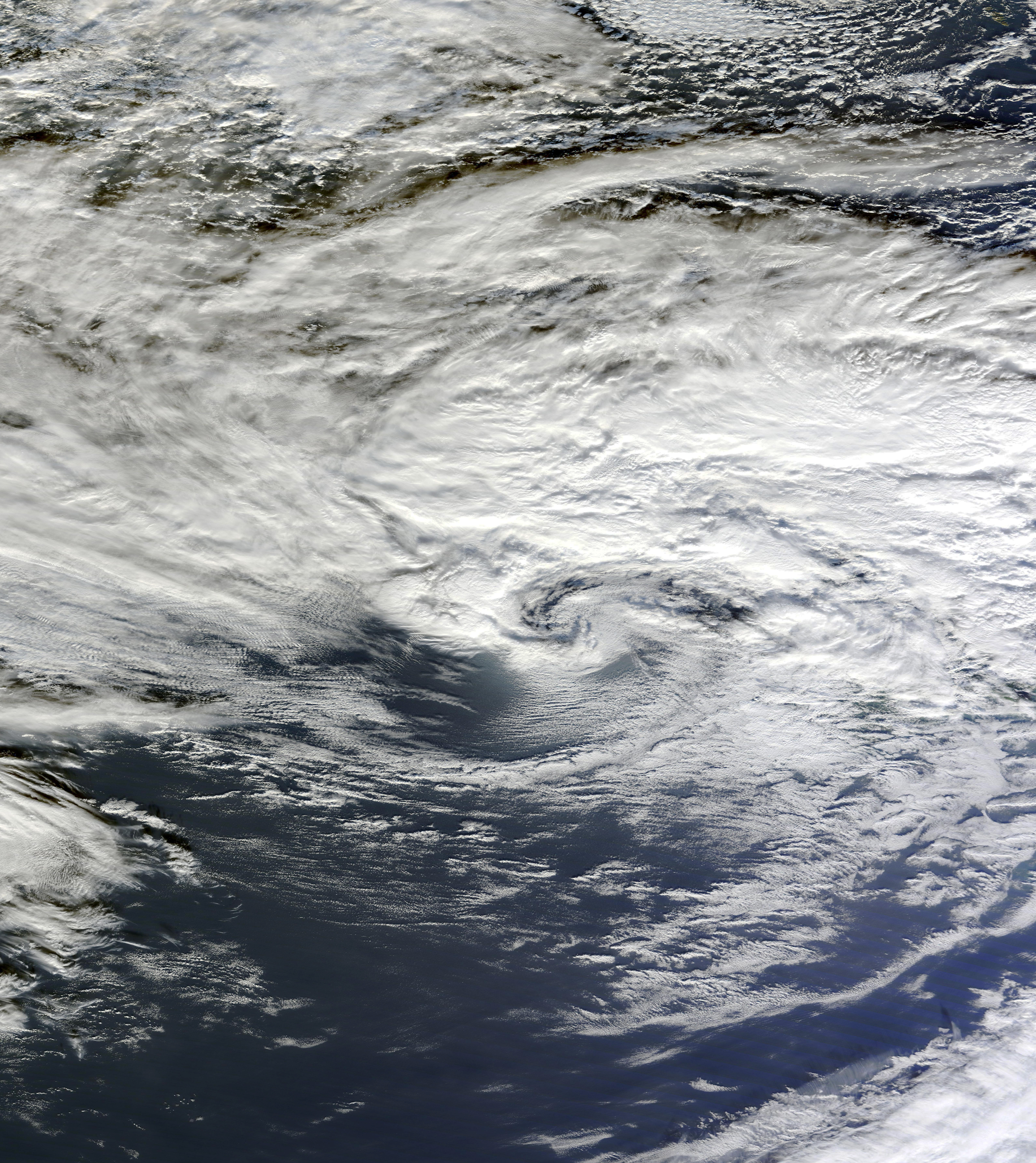
- MODIS image of Barney on 17 November 2015

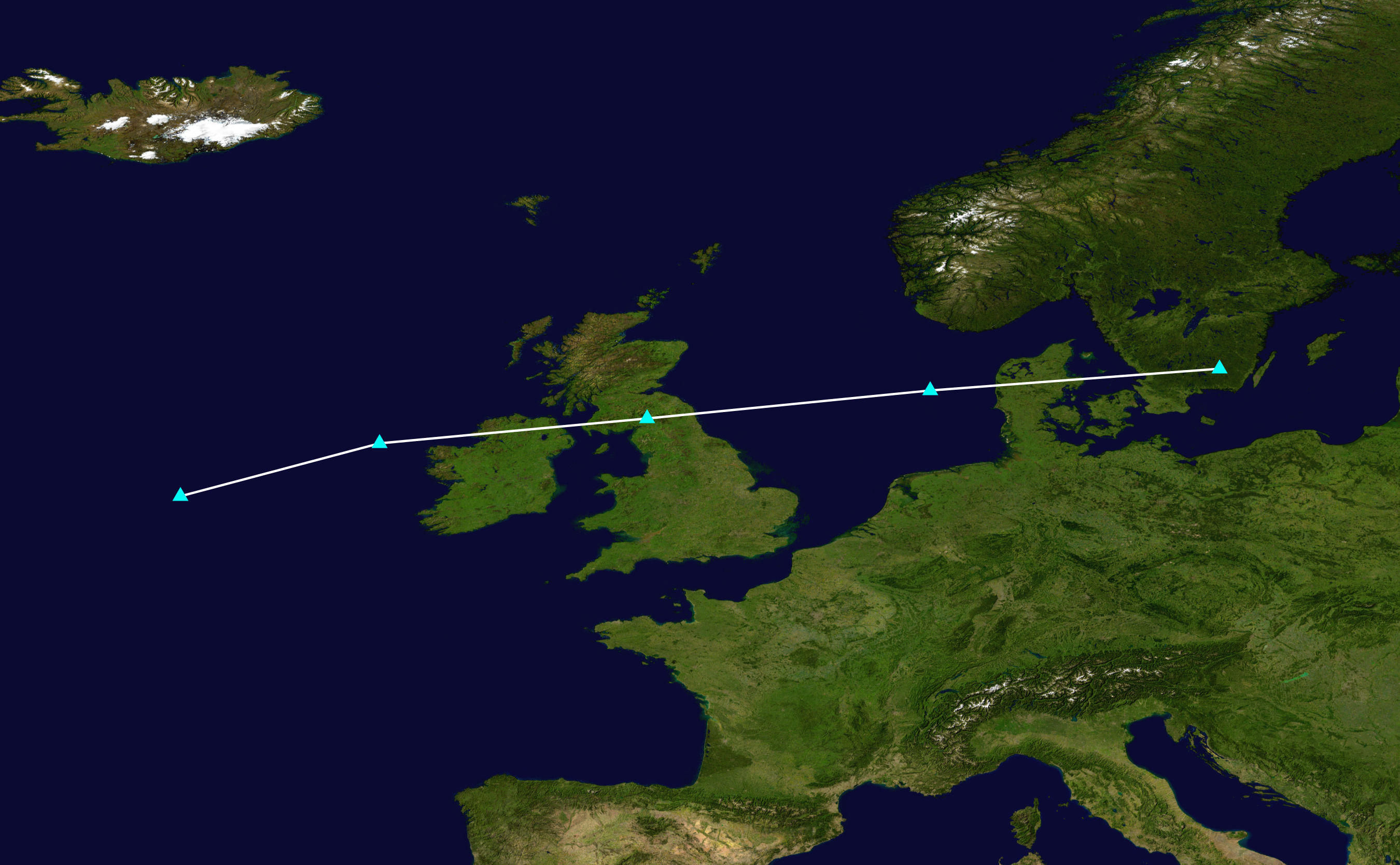
- Date of impact: 17–18 November
- Maximum wind gust: 85 mph (137 km/h; 74 kn) (Aberdaron, Gwynedd)
- Lowest pressure: 980 hPa (29 inHg)
- Fatalities: 0
- Power outages: 26,000
- Damage: ≥ £179 million (≥ €198 million)

A yellow warning for wind was issued by the Met Office for Wales, along with southern, central and eastern England, with gusts of 70 to 80 mph (110 to 130 km/h; 61 to 70 kn) expected on 17 November.

It affected Ireland, Wales, southern and eastern England and the Midlands, where thousands of homes lost power and rail services were disrupted. The storm was named Heini by the Free University of Berlin adopt-a-vortex scheme.

=== Storm Clodagh ===
Clodagh
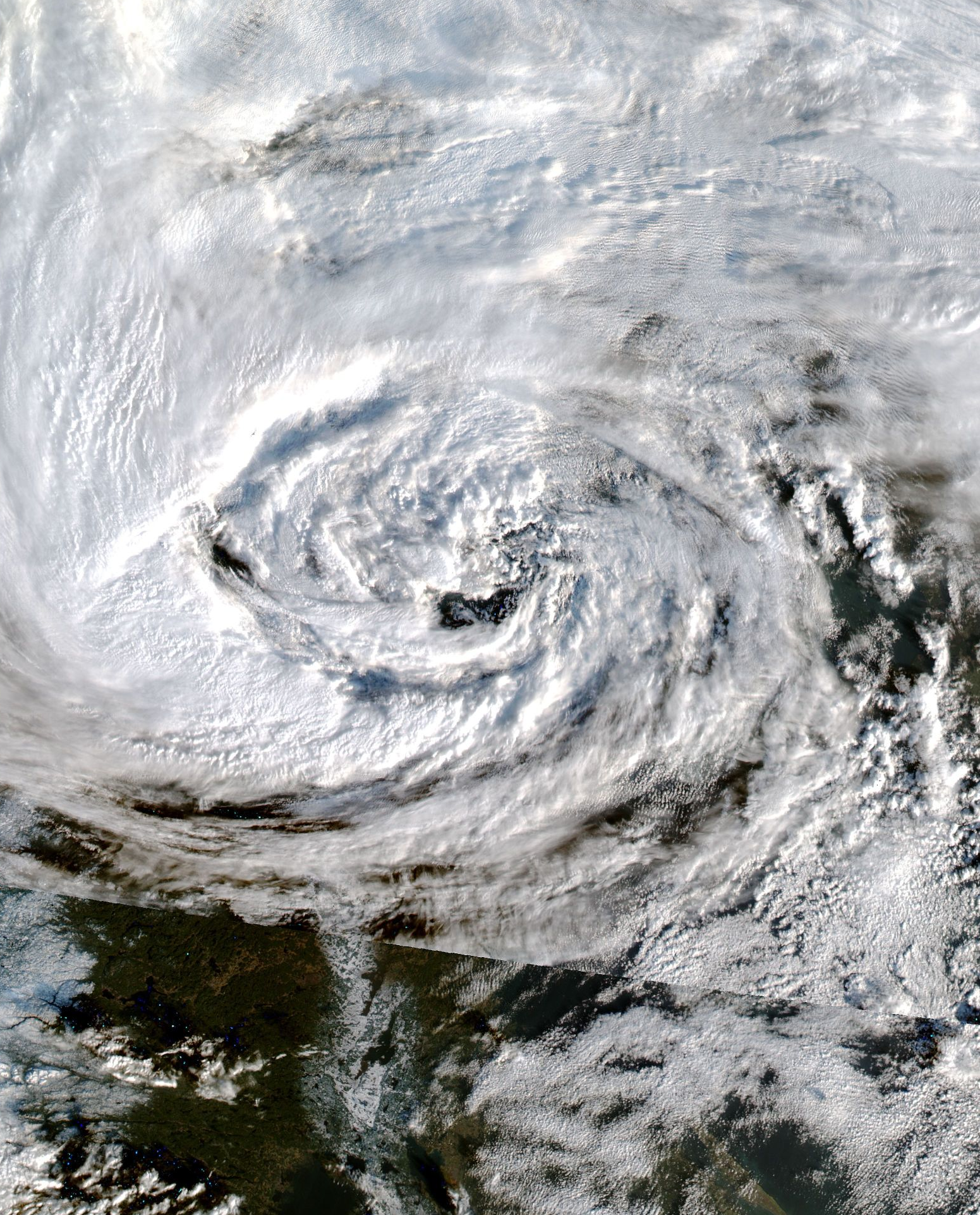
- MODIS image of Clodagh on 30 November

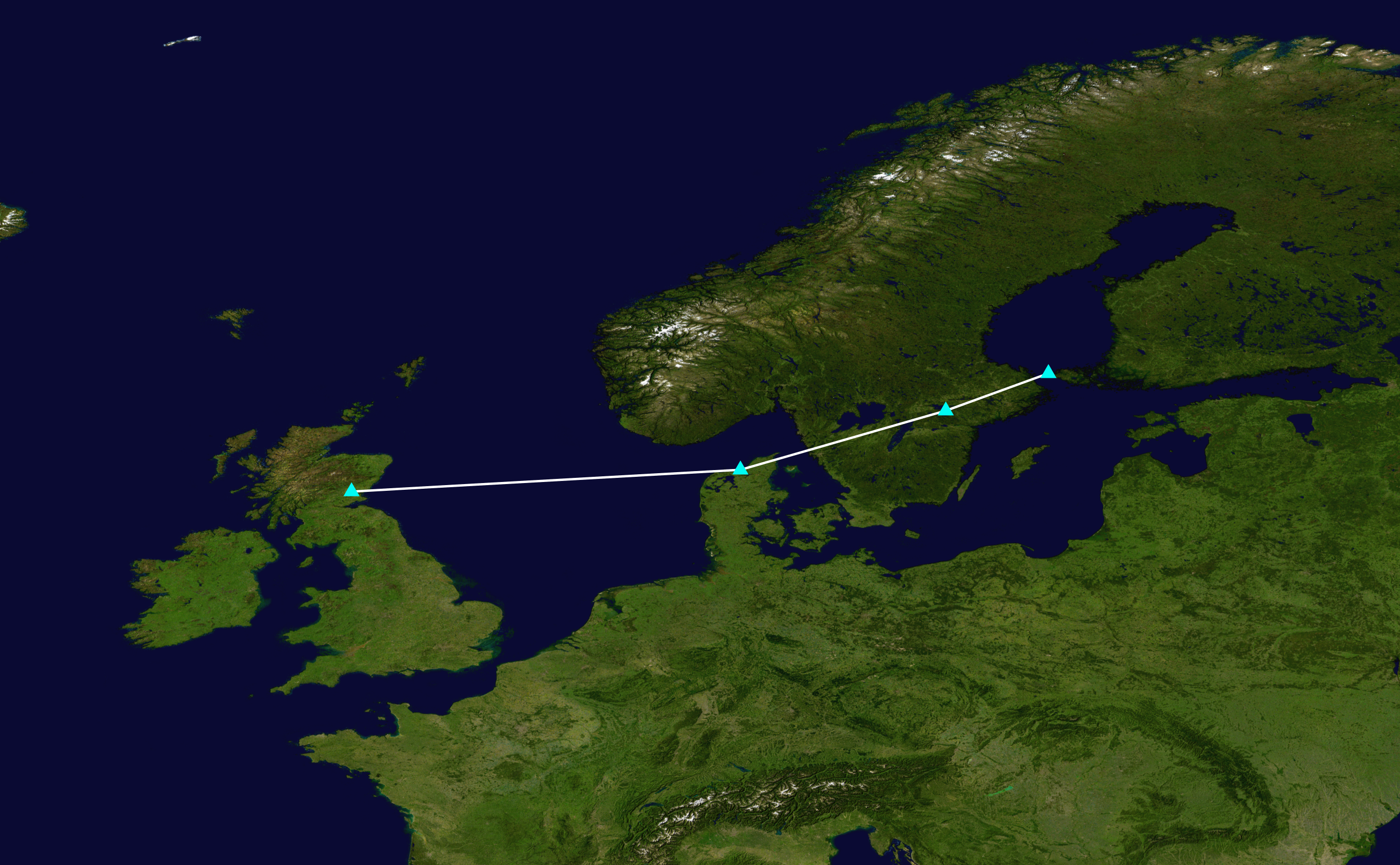
- Date of impact: 29 November
- Maximum wind gust: 97 mph (156 km/h; 84 kn) (High Bradfield, South Yorkshire)
- Lowest pressure: 968 hPa (28.6 inHg)
- Fatalities: 0
- Power outages: 16,000
- Damage: ≥ £8 million (≥ €9 million)

The Met Office issued a statement on 26 November saying that despite a prediction of windy weather in the coming days, the weather system was unlikely to become a named storm. On 28 November, Met Éireann upgraded its warnings and named the storm Clodagh. The Danish Meteorological Institute christened the low as Gorm on the same evening. The Free University of Berlin named the low Nils II.

In the UK and Ireland, Clodagh's impact was most severe in Ireland and North West England. In the Republic of Ireland 6,000 people were left without power. In Northwest England 10,000 customers were without power. It also caused disruption to transport in the North of England and Scotland.

=== Storm Desmond ===
Desmond
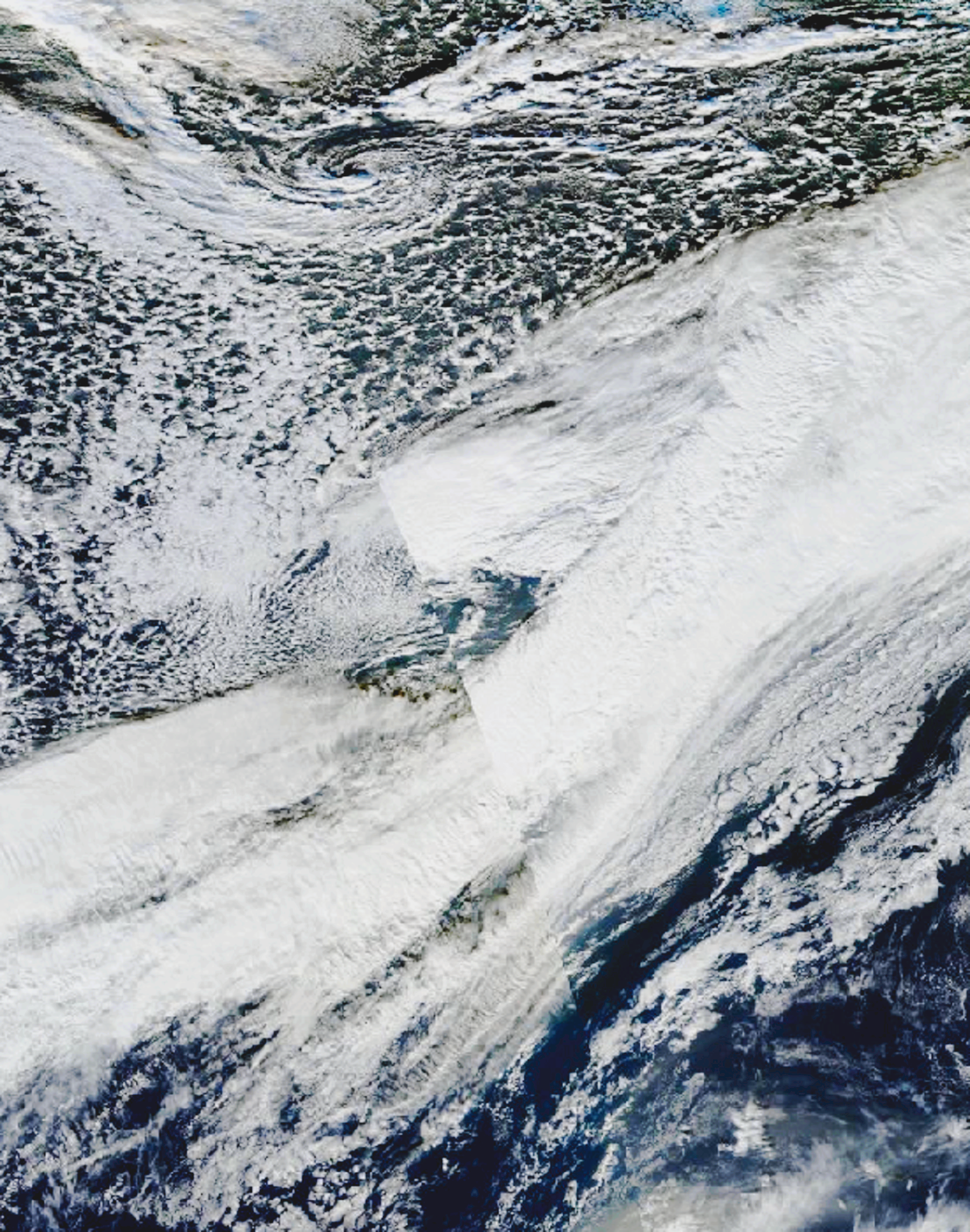
- MODIS image of Desmond on 5 December

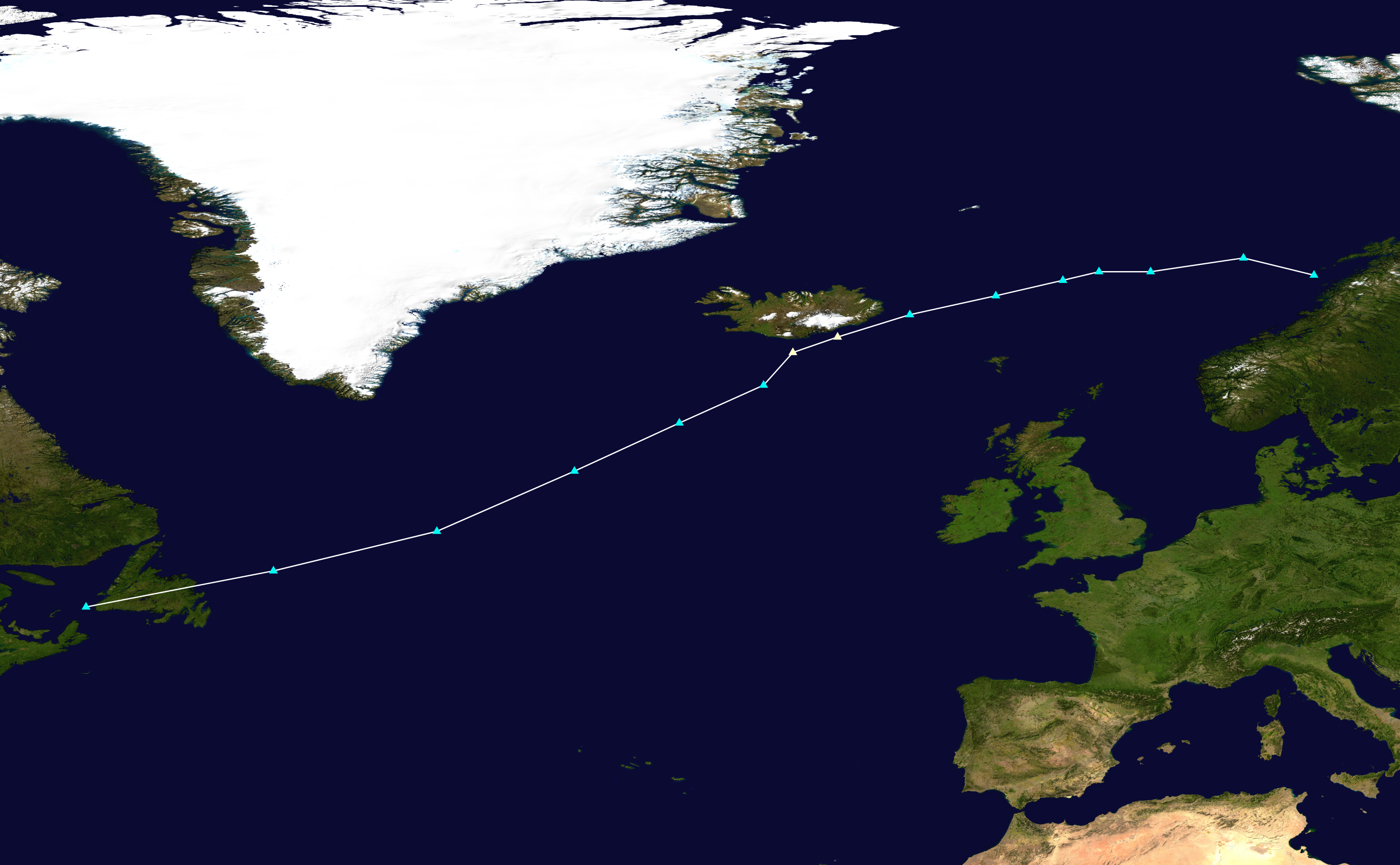
- Date of impact: 4–6 December
- Maximum wind gust: 81 mph (130 km/h; 70 kn) (Capel Curig, Conwy)
- Lowest pressure: 939 hPa (27.7 inHg)
- Fatalities: 3
- Power outages: 46,300
- Damage: ≥ £870 million (≥ €970 million)

Desmond was the fourth storm to be officially named, with heavy rain and severe gales forecast for 5–6 December across Ireland and the north of the UK. On 4 December, the Met Office issued yellow warnings for wind and rain across most of the north of the UK and an amber warning for rain in parts of central and southern Scotland, Tayside and Fife. Met Éireann issued a status red rainfall warning for areas of Connacht, as well as counties Donegal, Clare and Kerry, with Clare County Council issuing a flood warning.

On 5 December, the Met Office issued a red severe weather warning for rain in Cumbria. The Environment Agency had severe flood warnings in place for parts of the River Tyne in Northumberland and across Cumbria.

The expected heavy rainfall was considered to be an extreme weather event by the Norwegian Meteorological Institute, who named it Synne. The US National Weather Service Ocean Prediction Center tweeted that the heavy rain was due to Desmond pulling a plume of moist air across the Atlantic Ocean to Western Europe, a weather phenomenon known as an atmospheric river.

Approximately 1,000 people were evacuated from their homes in Hawick, Scottish Borders on 5 December, because the River Teviot flooded. Appleby and Keswick in the English county of Cumbria suffered blocked roads and some homes were evacuated; Cumbria Police declared the situation a "major incident". Homes left without electricity occurred in North Yorkshire (over 600) and in Wales (about 700); a further 2,000 people were without power in the Republic of Ireland. Landslides and flooding closed some main roads in Scotland and counties Down and Tyrone suffered road closures from fallen trees.

=== Storm Eva ===
Eva
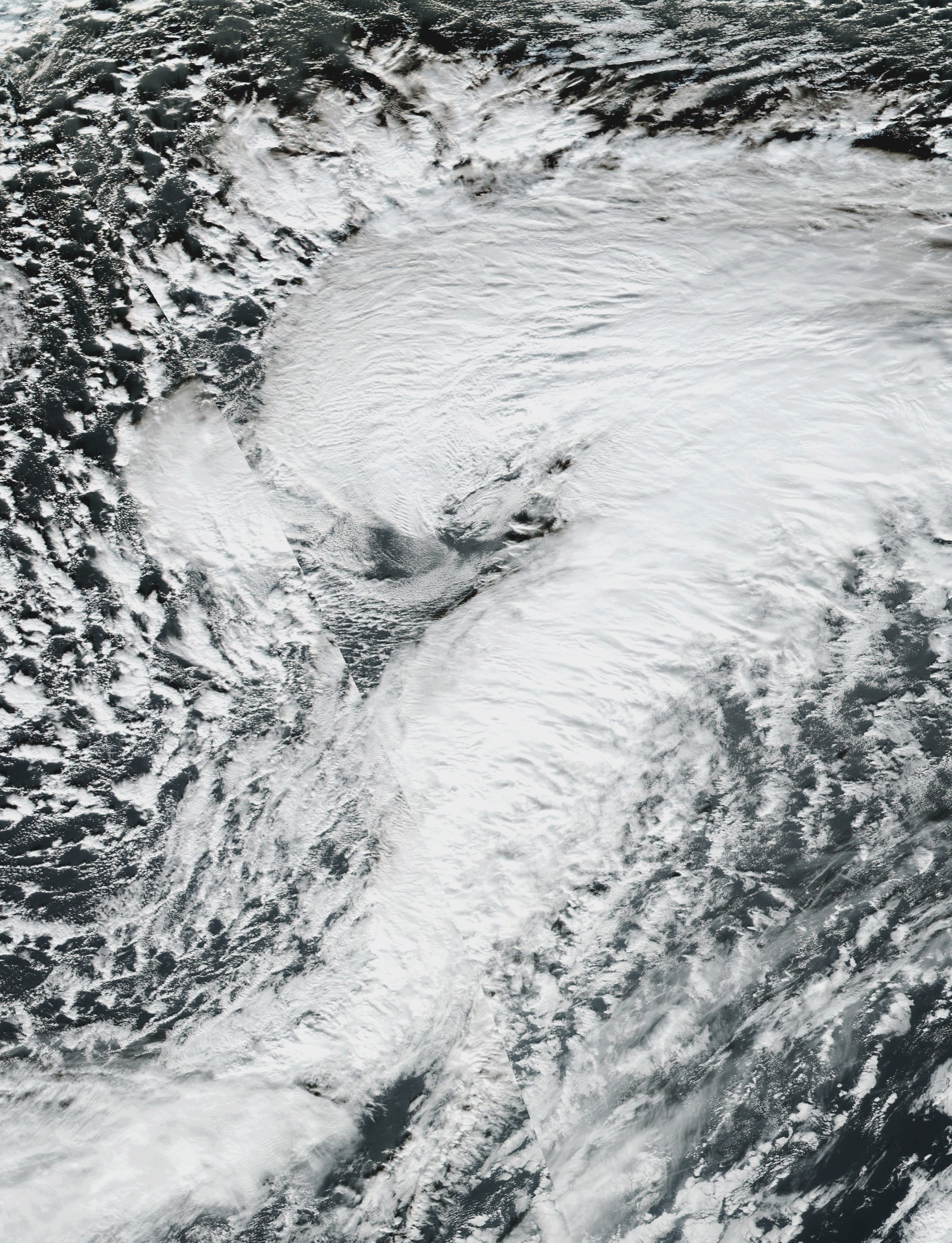
- MODIS image of Eva on 23 December 2015

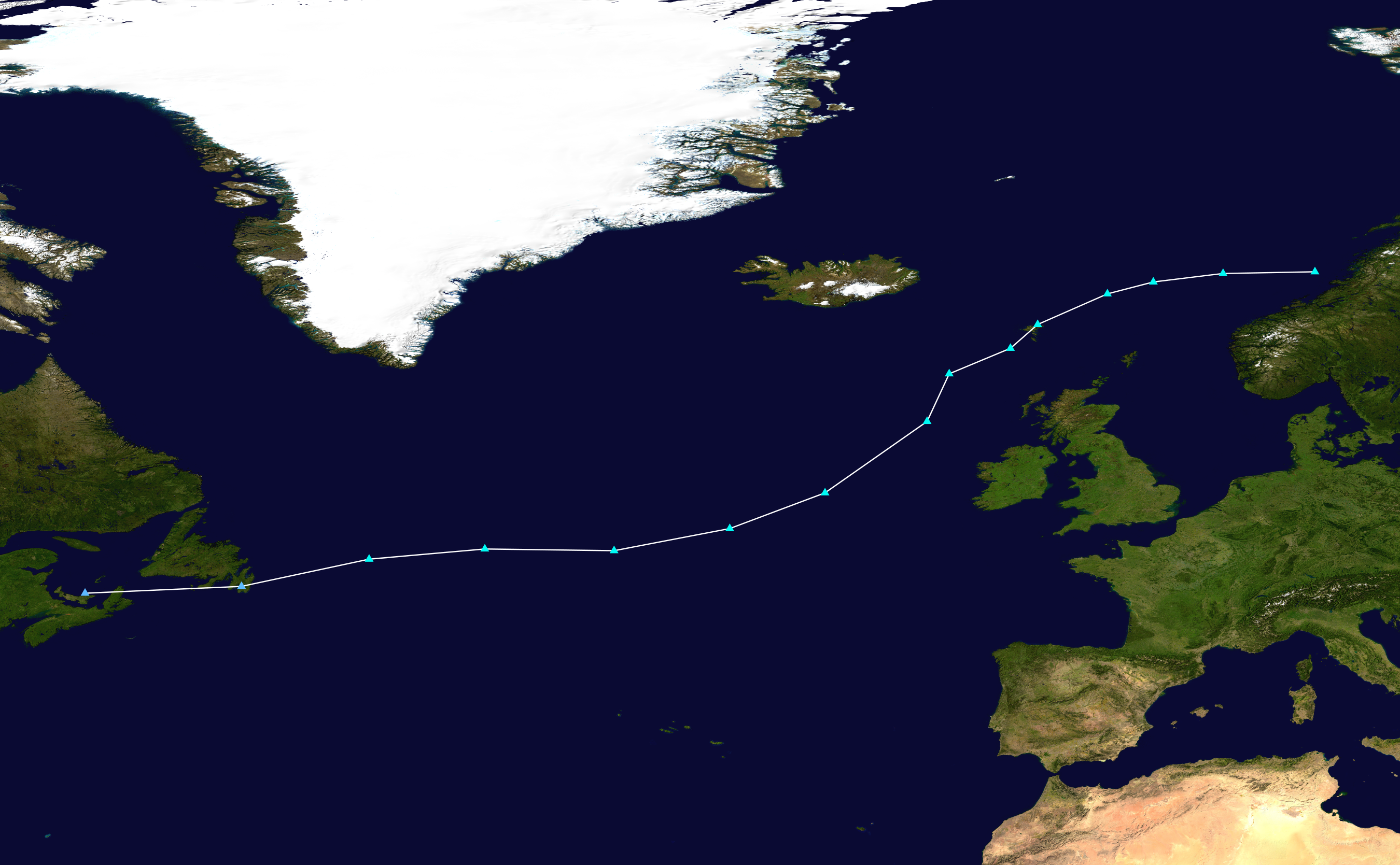
- Date of impact: 23–24 December
- Maximum wind gust: 84 mph (135 km/h; 73 kn) (Belmullet, County Mayo)
- Lowest pressure: 964 hPa (28.5 inHg)
- Fatalities: 0
- Power outages: 3,000
- Damage: ≥ £2.0 billion (≥ €2.2 billion)

Eva was the fifth storm to be officially named by Met Éireann on 22 December 2015, with an orange wind warning being issued for counties Clare, Galway, Mayo, Sligo and Donegal. Gales were also expected in the northwest of the UK, with storm force winds over parts of the Outer Hebrides. There were fears that the storm could cause further disruption to Cumbria in England, where areas were already dealing with the aftermath of flooding from Storm Desmond and in some cases had been flooded twice already. The army and Environment Agency staff were called in to be on stand-by to bolster flood defences.

Rain associated with the passage of Eva caused further disruption when rivers burst their banks in the Cumbrian towns of Appleby, Keswick and Kendal on 22 December, with Appleby receiving three to four feet of flood water. The village of Glenridding was badly flooded for the third time in the month. 6000 houses in Ireland were left without power. Liz Truss convened a COBRA meeting to decide on emergency measures, which included the deployment of soldiers from the 2nd Battalion, Duke of Lancaster's Regiment to the affected areas. On 24 December, flood defence gates were closed in Carlisle, Keswick and Cockermouth to limit the damage of rainfall and 20 water pumps and two kilometres of temporary flood barriers were transported to northern England. Ferries operating between Dublin and Holyhead were cancelled due to bad weather on the Irish Sea.

The media widely reported Storm Eva as being responsible for the flooding which occurred in Lancashire and Yorkshire on 25–27 December 2015. However, communications from the Met Office indicated that Eva's only direct impact on the UK was strong winds and a band of rain during 23–24 December 2015. By 26 December Storm Eva was located over the far north of Norway. The persistent heavy rain from 25 to 27 December was caused by a subsequent slow moving depression and frontal zone. Despite red warnings for rain being issued by the Met Office on 26 December 2015, no name was given to this depression since there were no warnings issued for wind.

=== Storm Frank ===
Frank
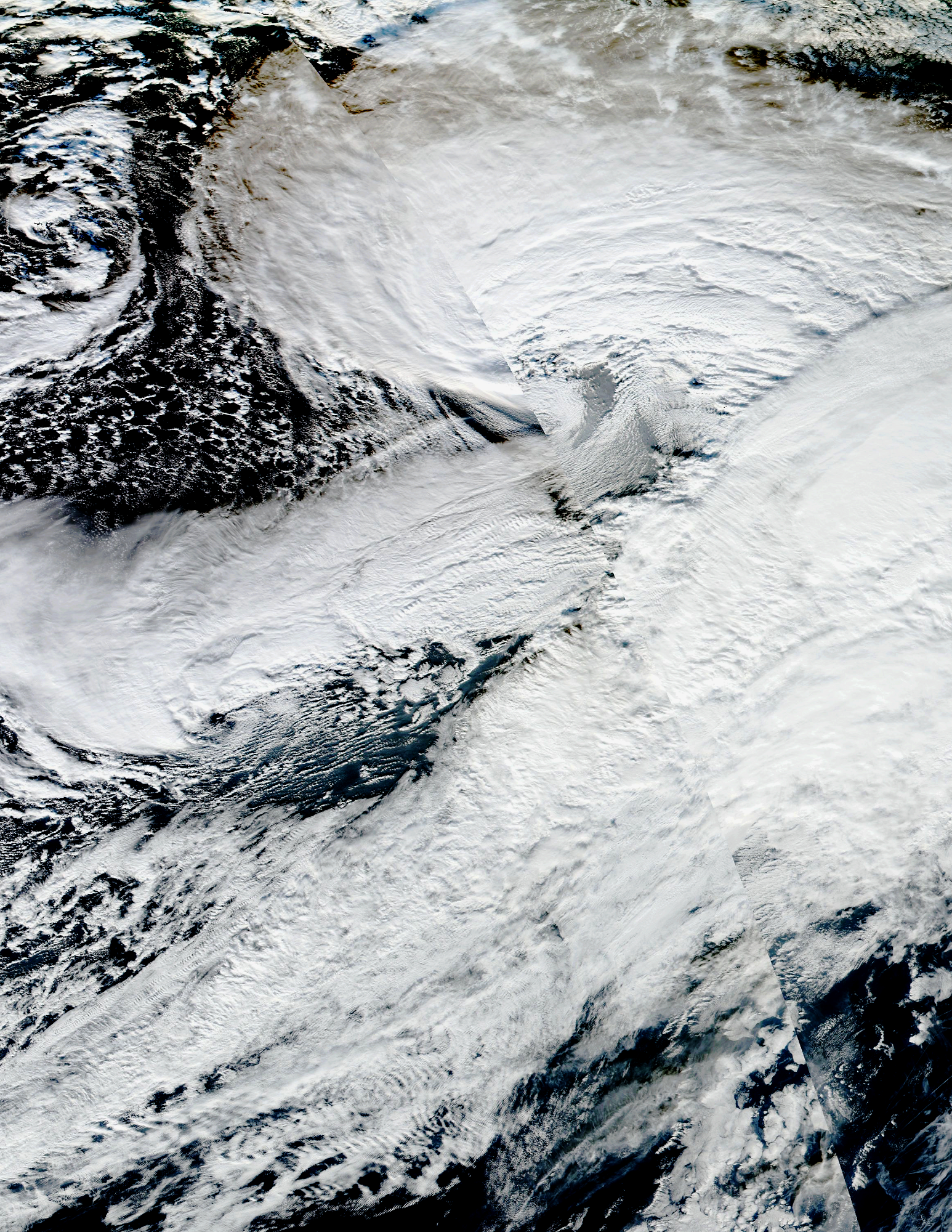
- MODIS image of Frank on 29 December 2015

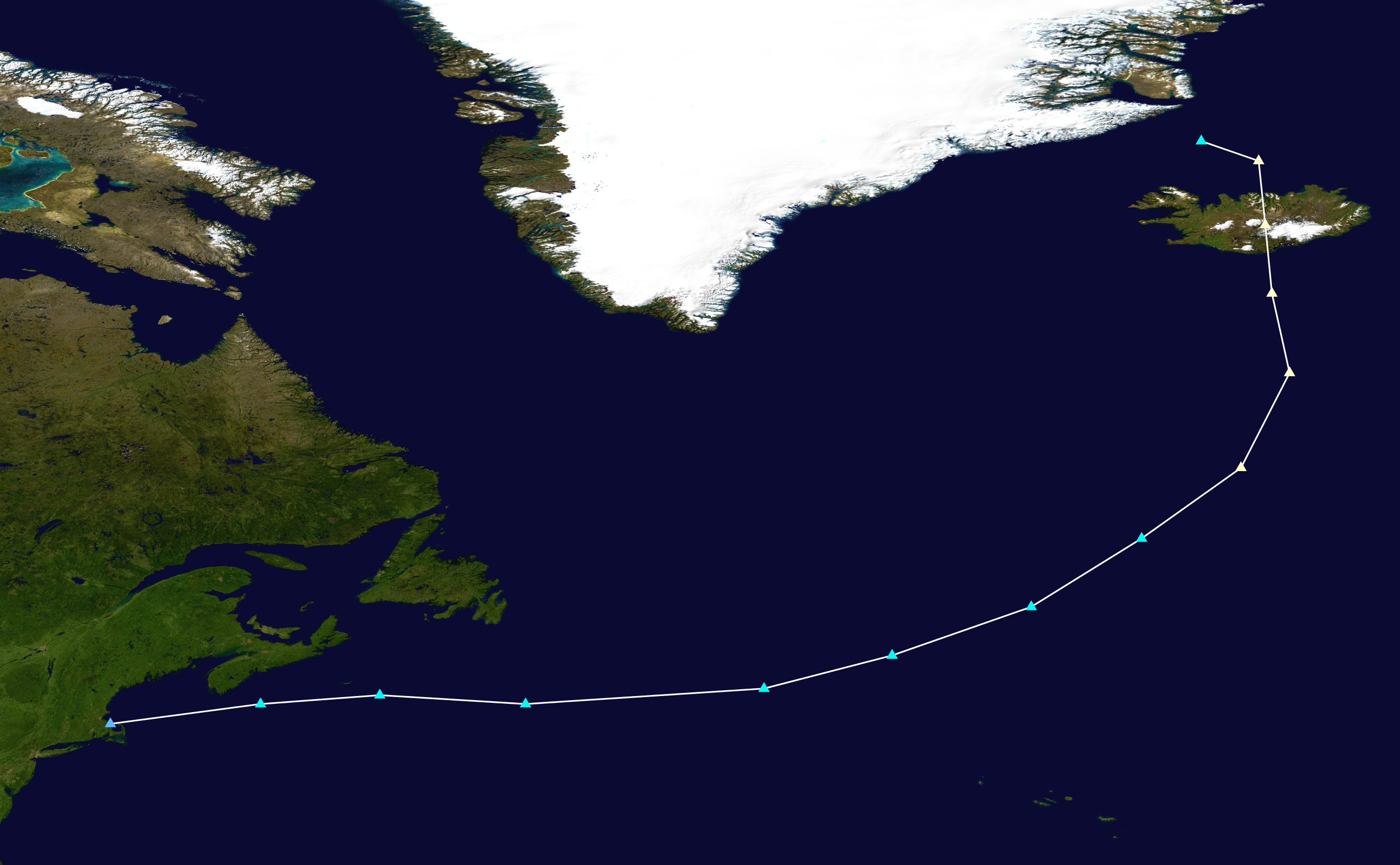
- Date of impact: 29–30 December
- Maximum wind gust: 85 mph (137 km/h; 74 kn) (South Uist, Outer Hebrides)
- Lowest pressure: 928 hPa (27.4 inHg)
- Fatalities: 3
- Power outages: 27,900
- Damage: ≥ £280 million (≥ €310 million)

Frank was the sixth storm to be officially named by the Met Office on 28 December 2015, and brought severe gales to western parts of the UK as well as persistent, heavy rainfall. It caused some disruption over Northern Ireland, west and southwest Scotland, northwest England and Wales on 30 December. Amber 'be prepared' rainfall warnings, meaning "danger to life," had been issued because of severe flooding reported in England and Scotland.

In Scotland, Frank caused floods in the towns of Dumfries, Peebles and Ballater flooded by the rivers Nith, Tweed and Dee.

The storm claimed three casualties across Cornwall, Moray and the Highlands.

The Free University of Berlin named the storm Eckard.

=== Storm Gertrude ===
Gertrude
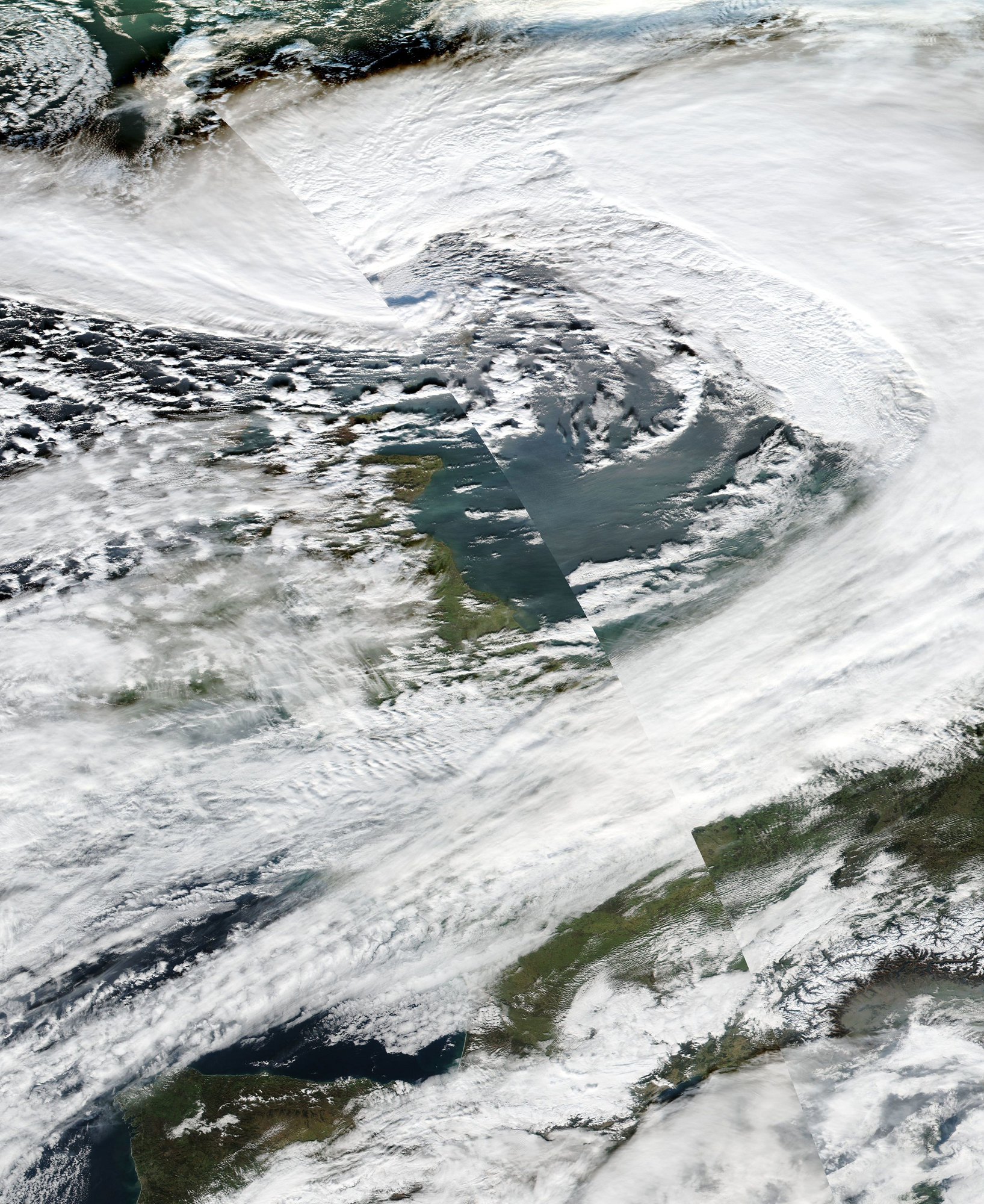
- MODIS image of Gertrude on 29 January 2016

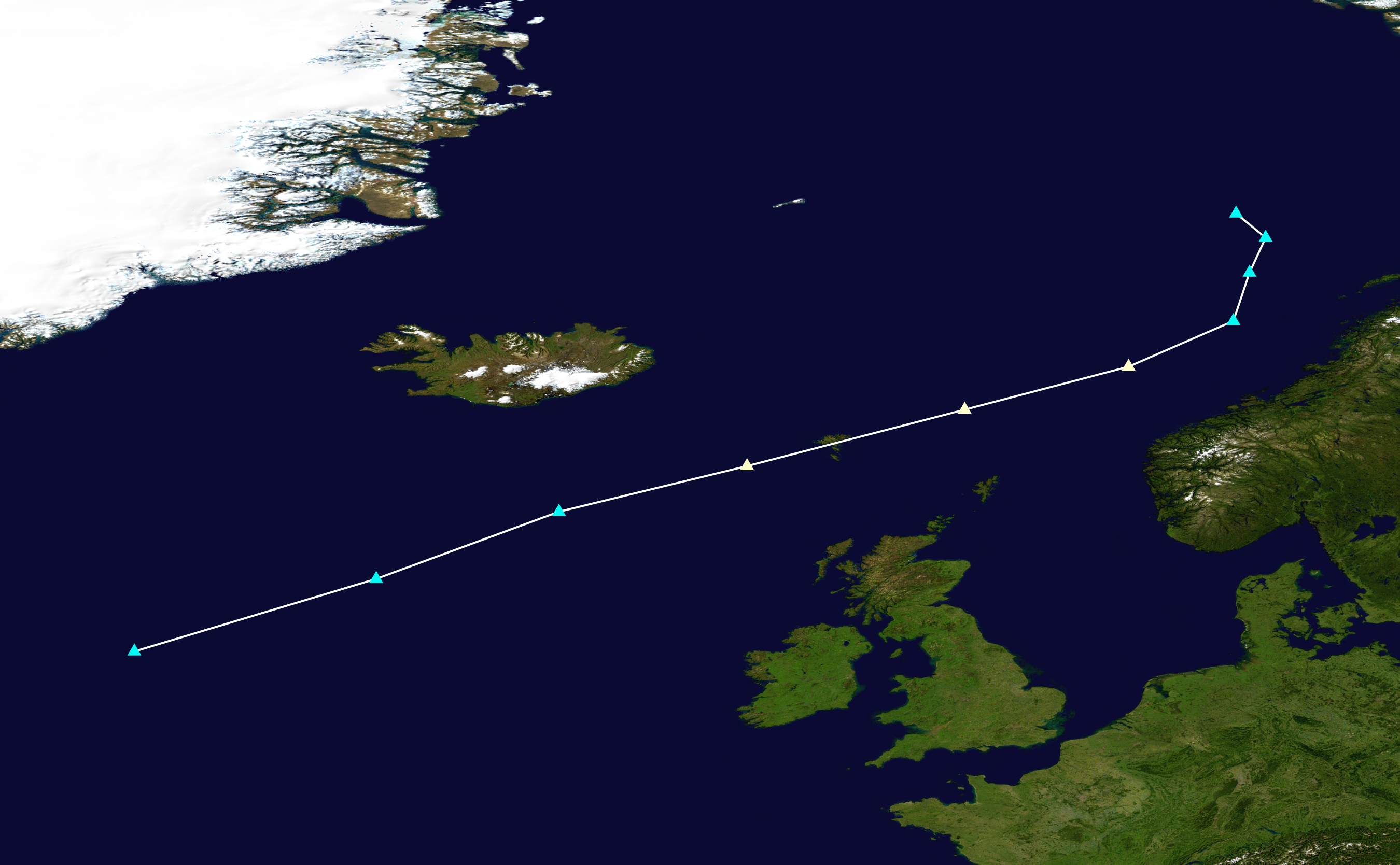
- Date of impact: 29 January
- Maximum wind gust: 105 mph (169 km/h; 91 kn) (Lerwick, Shetland Islands)
- Lowest pressure: 948 hPa (28.0 inHg)
- Fatalities: 0
- Power outages: 10,000
- Damage: ≥ £80 million (≥ €90 million)

On 28 January, the Met Office released news of the seventh named storm, Gertrude. In the release, they forecast a deepening area of low pressure to pass close to the north of Scotland on the night of 29 January, accompanied by a powerful jet stream from the Atlantic. It was anticipated that Scotland and Northern England would experience gales or severe gales (60–70 mph [97–113 km/h; 52–61 kn] widely; possible 80 mph [130 km/h; 70 kn]) with the Northern Isles "likely" to reach storm force winds (widely 70–80 mph [110–130 km/h; 61–70 kn], occasionally 90 mph [140 km/h; 78 kn]). They warned of impacts to transport, power supplies and structural damage. The extent of amber severe weather warnings spread across the Northern Isles, western and southern Scotland and the "far north" of England and Northern Ireland. The winds for the early morning of 29 January were forecast to widely reach 60–70 mph (97–113 km/h; 52–61 kn) and perhaps 80 mph (130 km/h; 70 kn) in places. The Met Office noted other hazards such as large waves on western coasts and surface water from heavy rain during the morning.

Winds were expected to strengthen and create the risk of blizzard conditions, especially over high ground in the north of Scotland. The Chief Operational Meteorologist said: "There remains some uncertainty over the exact track and intensity of the storm", however there was "higher confidence now" on the forecast of very strong winds and storm force winds in the Northern Isles. Press releases from Transport NI and Scotland's Transport Minister, Derek Mackay, reaffirmed the risk of strong winds and advised people to take care during the course of the storm. At 09:03 on 29 January, the Met Office upgraded the warning to red over the Shetland Islands (between 12:00 and 16:00), with gusts of around 100 mph (160 km/h; 87 kn) expected and warned of very large waves.

Gertrude caused the closures or restrictions on some bridges (Erskine Bridge, Tay Road Bridge, Forth Road Bridge and Severn Bridge) during the storm. On 29 January, 10% of Abellio ScotRail services were cancelled. There were also power cuts across Scotland and Northern Ireland.

=== Storm Henry ===
Henry
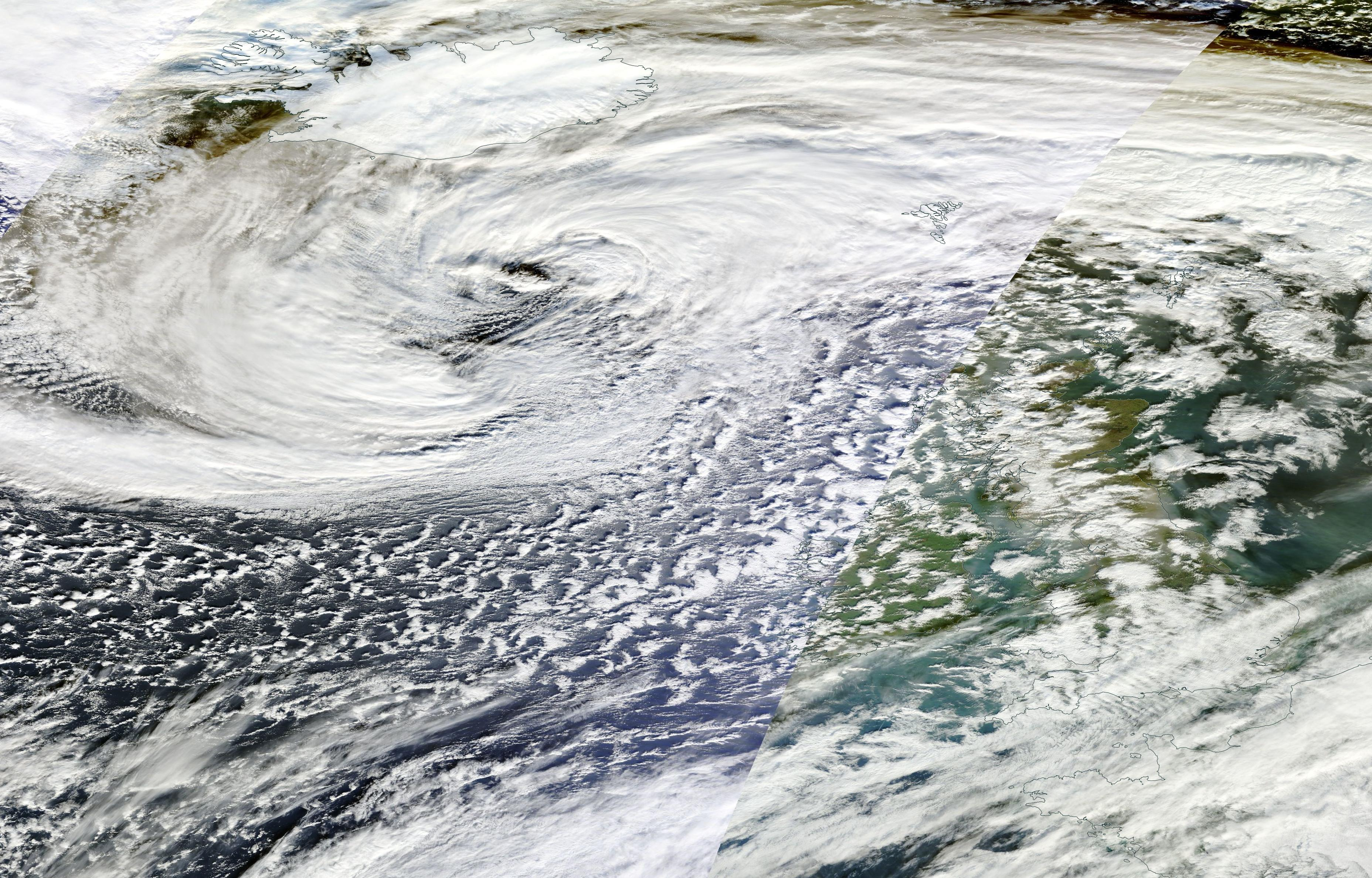
- Satellite photo of Henry to the north-west on 1 February
- Date of impact: 1–2 February
- Maximum wind gust: 90 mph (140 km/h; 78 kn); South Uist, Outer Hebrides
- Lowest pressure: 944 hPa (27.9 inHg)
- Fatalities: 0
- Power outages: 3,000
- Damage: ≥ £80 million (≥ €90 million)

On 30 January, the Met Office released news about the eighth named storm of the season, Henry. It was forecast to bring heavy rain and very strong gusts of wind across Scotland, northern England and northern Wales on 1–2 February, particularly into the night of 1 February. It was anticipated to bring gales across north Wales and north England, and severe gales across Scotland, most notably in the western isles, which was expected to bring gusts of up to 90 mph (140 km/h; 78 kn), resulting in amber wind warnings being issued. Localised flooding, transport disruption and issues with power supplies were expected, along with storm large waves being an additional concern.

=== Storm Imogen ===
Imogen
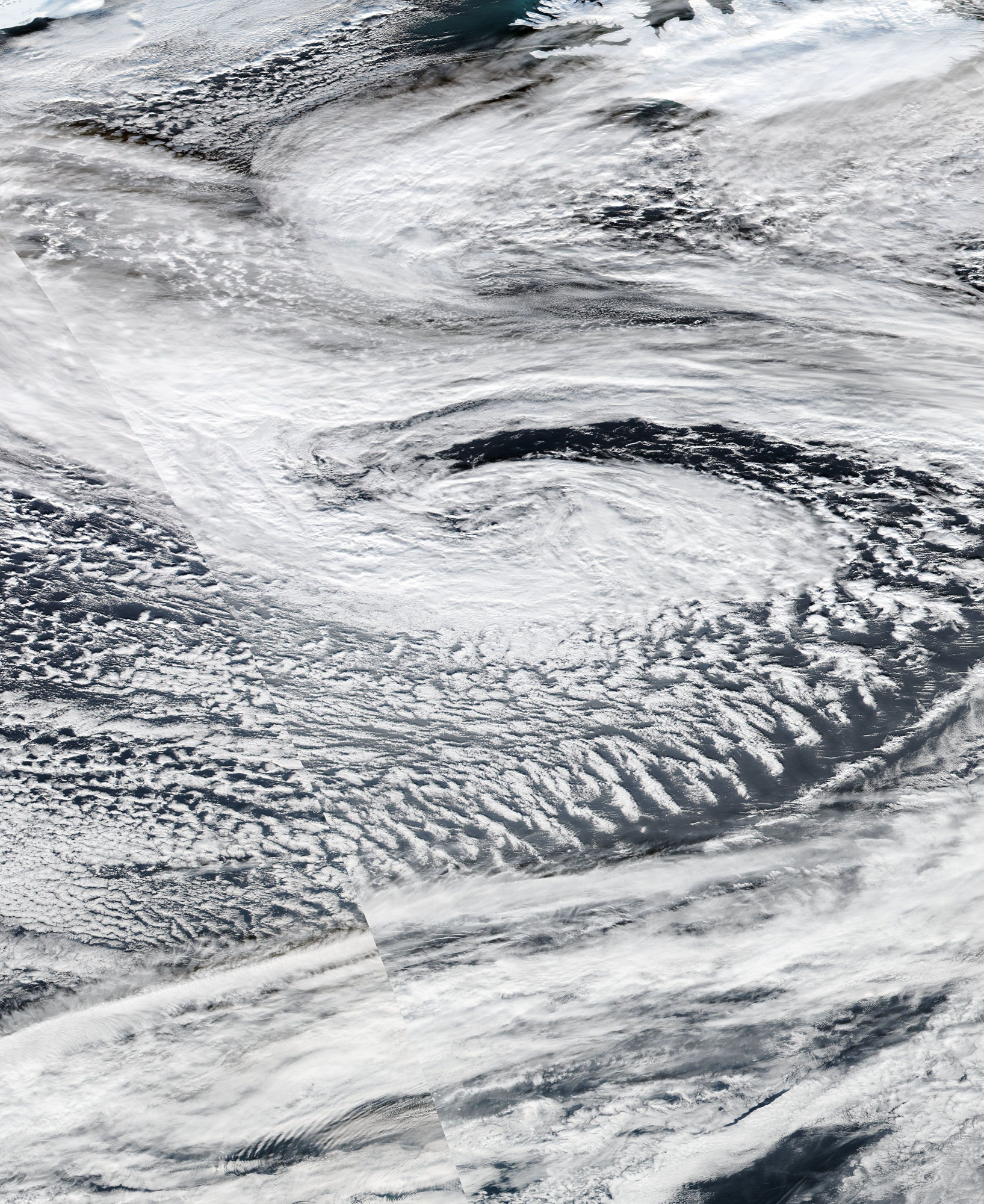
- MODIS image of Imogen on 7 February 2016
- Date of impact: 7–8 February
- Maximum wind gust: 96 mph (154 km/h; 83 kn); The Needles Old Battery, Isle of Wight
- Lowest pressure: 962 hPa (28.4 inHg)
- Fatalities: 0
- Power outages: 19,000
- Damage: ≥ £80 million (≥ €90 million)

On 6 February Met Éireann issued an amber warning for strong winds and named Storm Imogen. At this stage the Met Office had issued a yellow warning for strong winds in south-west England and South Wales. On 7 February, the Met Office yellow warning area was enlarged and an amber warning added for winds across south-western England of 60–70 mph (97–113 km/h; 52–61 kn) and locally 80 mph (130 km/h; 70 kn) on 8 February. They warned of the risk to trees, structures, interruption of power supplies and transport, especially the M4 and M5 motorways. On 8 February Storm Imogen brought trees down, produced large coastal waves, caused power cuts and toppled high-sided vehicles across southern England and Wales.

=== Storm Jake ===
Jake
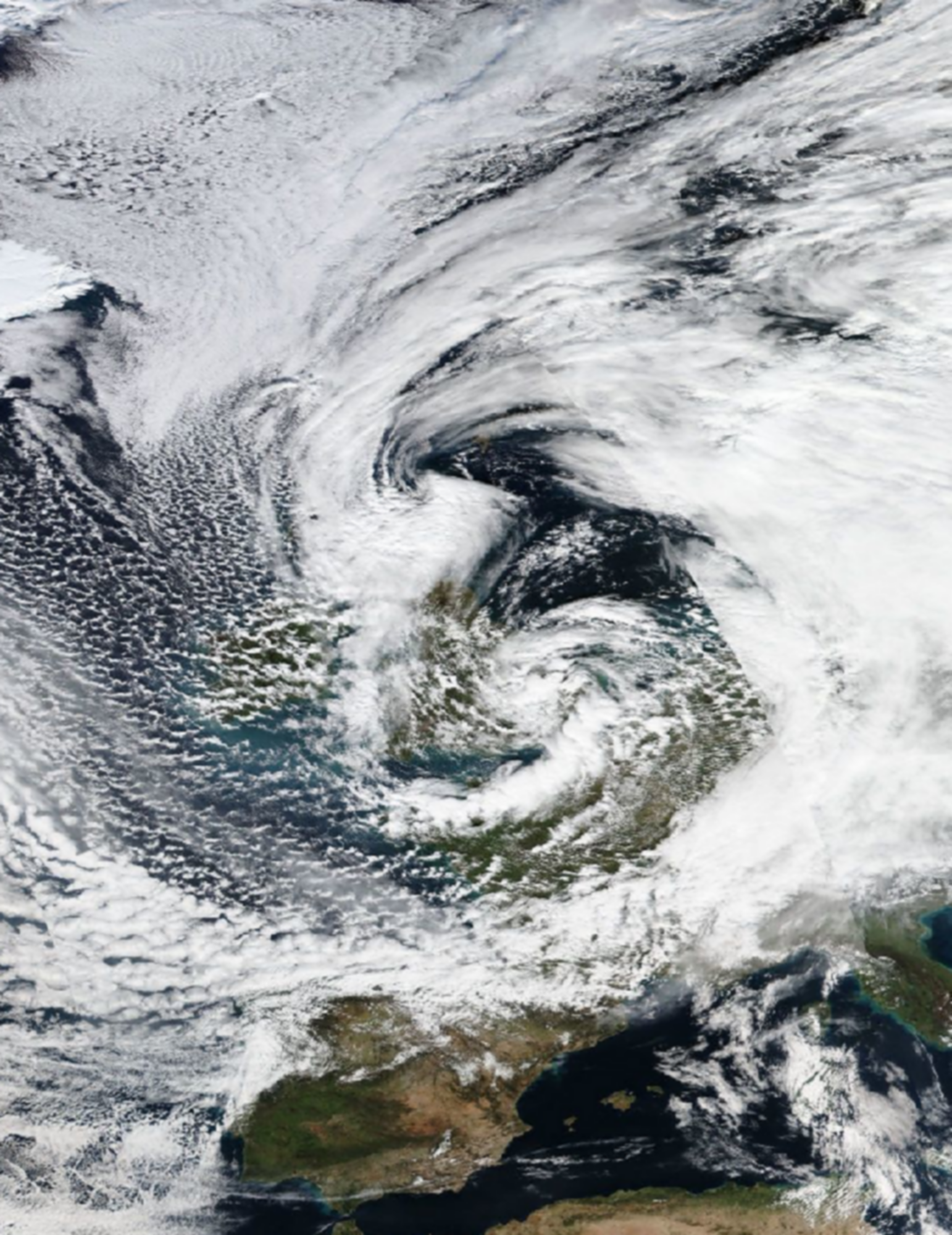
- MODIS image of Jake on 2 March 2016
- Date of impact: 2 March
- Maximum wind gust: 83 mph (134 km/h; 72 kn), Mace Head
- Lowest pressure: 989 hPa (29.2 inHg)
- Fatalities: 0
- Power outages: 8,240
- Damage: Unknown

Jake was named by Met Éireann on 1 March based on an amber warning of strong winds for counties Galway, Mayo, Clare, Cork, Kerry and Limerick. Strong winds were experienced in much of the Republic of Ireland and also Wales and south-west England on 2 March. There were power cuts and trees blown down in parts of Wales. Disruption was also experienced in parts of south-west England.

=== Storm Katie ===
Katie
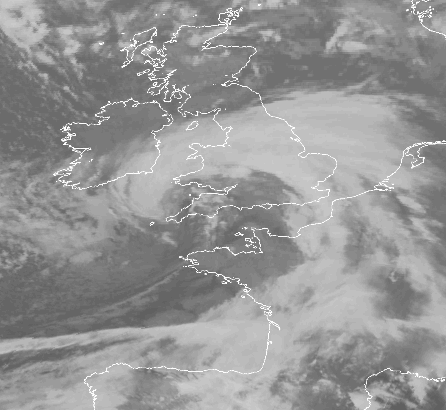
- IR image of Storm Katie developing to the SW of England on 28 March 2016
- Date of impact: 28 March
- Maximum wind gust: 106 mph (171 km/h; 92 kn); The Needles Old Battery, Isle of Wight
- Lowest pressure: 971 hPa (28.67 inHg)
- Fatalities: 1
- Power outages: 100,000
- Damage: ≥ £80 million (≥ €90 million)

Katie, the eleventh storm of the season, was named by the Met Office on Good Friday, 25 March. During the first half of Easter Monday, 28 March strong winds were experienced widely across southern England with coastal gusts of 70–80 mph (110–130 km/h; 61–70 kn) and inland gusts of 50–70 mph (80–113 km/h; 43–61 kn) in many places. The peak gust of 106 mph (171 km/h; 92 kn) was recorded at the exposed site of The Needles Old Battery. Impacts were widespread across southern England including trees felled, wall, fence and roof damage, scaffolding collapses, bridge closures, flights, ferries and train cancellations and power outages.

== Season effects ==
This table lists all known windstorms that affected the UK and Ireland during 2015–2016. It includes their name, duration, peak recorded gust (excluding mountain stations), lowest pressure, areas affected, deaths, and damage totals from the two nations. All damage figures are in 2015 pounds sterling and euros. The season's first half was more notable for rainfall and flooding, similar to that seen during the 2013–2014 Atlantic winter storms in Europe, which brought the 2013–2014 United Kingdom winter floods.

Storm	Dates active	Highest wind gust	Lowest pressure	Casualties	Damages
Abigail	7 – 15 November	84 mph (135 km/h; 73 kn)	964 hPa (28.5 inHg)	0	Unknown
Barney	16 – 18 November	85 mph (137 km/h; 74 kn)	980 hPa (29 inHg)	0	≥ £179 million (≥ €198 million)
Clodagh	26 – 30 November	97 mph (156 km/h; 84 kn)	968 hPa (28.6 inHg)	0	≥ £8 million (≥ €9 million)
Desmond	3 – 8 December	81 mph (130 km/h; 70 kn)	939 hPa (27.7 inHg)	3	≥ £870 million (≥ €970 million)
Eva	22 – 25 December	84 mph (135 km/h; 73 kn)	964 hPa (28.5 inHg)	0	≥ £2.0 billion (≥ €2.2 billion)
Frank	28 – 31 December	85 mph (137 km/h; 74 kn)	928 hPa (27.4 inHg)	3	≥ £280 million (≥ €310 million)
Gertrude	29 January	105 mph (169 km/h; 91 kn)	948 hPa (28.0 inHg)	0	≥ £80 million (≥ €90 million)
Henry	1 – 2 February	90 mph (140 km/h; 78 kn)	944 hPa (27.9 inHg)	0	≥ £80 million (≥ €90 million)
Imogen	8 February	96 mph (154 km/h; 83 kn)	962.6 hPa (28.43 inHg)	0	≥ £80 million (≥ €90 million)
Jake	1 – 4 March	83 mph (134 km/h; 72 kn)	988.9 hPa (29.20 inHg)	0	Unknown
Katie	25 – 28 March	106 mph (171 km/h; 92 kn)	971.0 hPa (28.67 inHg)	1	≥ £80 million (≥ €90 million)
Season Aggregates
11 windstorms	7 November – 28 March	106 mph (171 km/h; 92 kn)	928 hPa (27.4 inHg)	7	≥ £3.657 billion (≥ €4.047 billion)

== Storms named by other European meteorological services ==
2015–16 Named storms table.
- Unnamed (FUB), Roar (Nor), Valio (Fin), 3–4 October.
- Binrasheed (FUB), Freja^{(da wiki)} (DMI), 7–10 November.
- Frank (FUB), Abigail (UK/IE), 11–17 November.
- Heini (FUB), Barney (UK/IE), 16–19 November.
- Nils II (FUB), Clodagh (UK/IE), Gorm^{(da wiki)}(DMI), 29–30 November.
- Rudi (FUB), Helga^{(da wiki)} (DMI), 3–4 December.
- Ted (FUB), Desmond (UK/IE), Synne (Nor), 3–8 December.
- Uwe (FUB), Diddú (Isl), 7 December.
- Chuck (FUB), Eva (UK/IE), Staffan (SMHI), 24–26 December.
- Eckard (FUB), Frank (UK/IE), 29–30 December.
- Marita (FUB), Gertrude (UK/IE), Tor (Nor), 29–30 January.
- Norkys (FUB), Henry (UK/IE), 1–2 February.
- Ruzica–Susanna (FUB), Imogen (UK/IE), 7–8 February.
- Aloisia II (FUB), Jake (UK/IE), 2–3 March.
- Jeanne (FUB), Katie (UK/IE), 28 March.

== See also ==
- European Windstorm
