= Storm Eva =

2015 storm affecting Ireland and UK

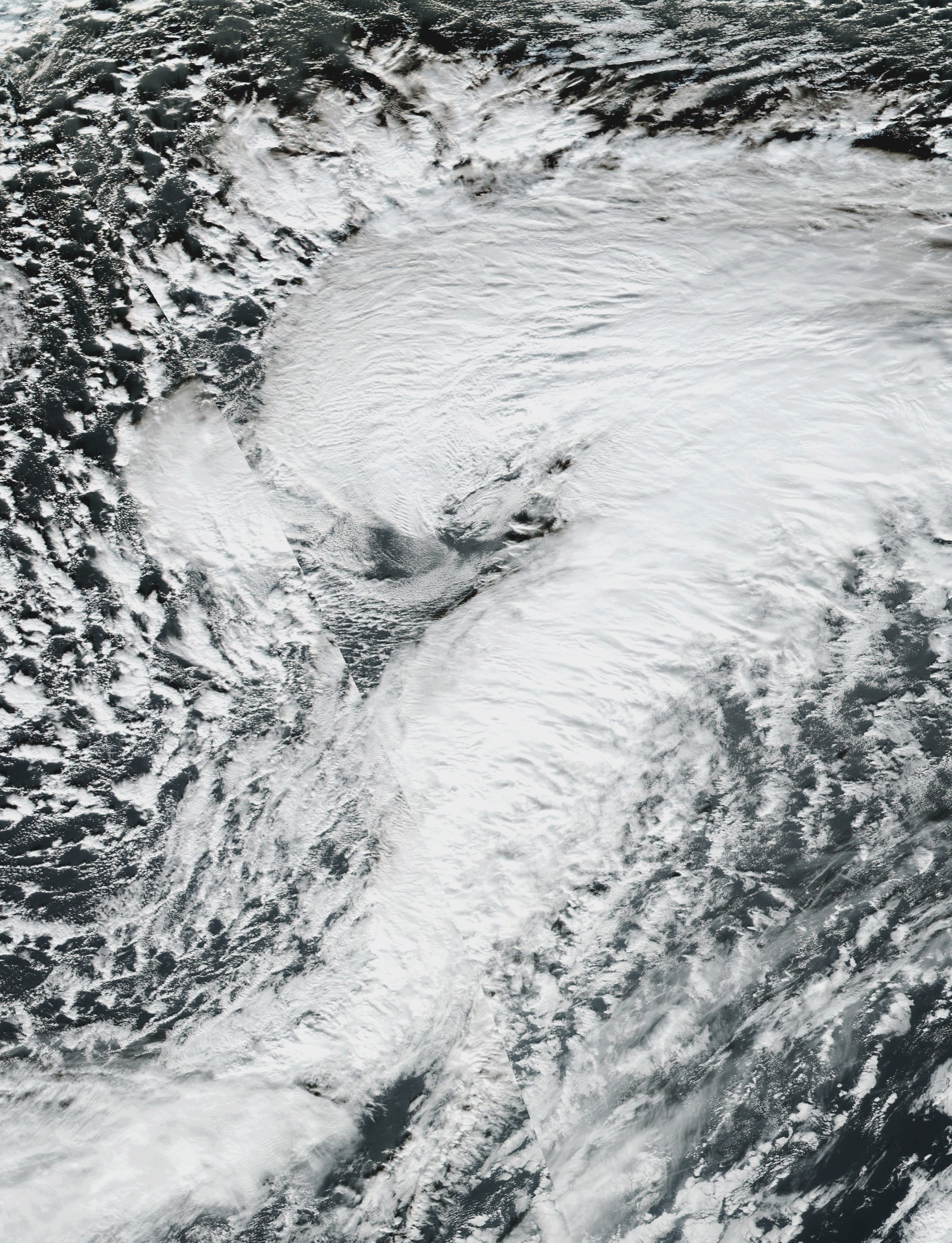
- Storm Eva 23 December

Meteorological history
- Formed: 23 December 2015 (Note: This is the date it made an impact on the UK and Ireland.)
- Dissipated: 24 December 2015

Extratropical cyclone
- Highest gusts: 84 mph (135 km/h) (Belmullet, County Mayo, Ireland)

Overall effects
- Damage: ≥ £2.0 billion (≥ €2.2 billion) (2015)
- Areas affected: Ireland, United Kingdom
- Power outages: 3,000
- Part of the 2015–16 UK and Ireland windstorm season

Storm Eva (also called Chuck, Staffan and other names) was the fifth named storm of the Met Office and Met Éireann's Name our Storms project. Heavy rainfall from Eva occurred around three weeks after Storm Desmond had brought severe flooding to parts of Northern England, exacerbating the ongoing situation. The low pressure was named Chuck by the Free University of Berlin and Staffan by the Swedish Meteorological Institute.

== Meteorological history ==
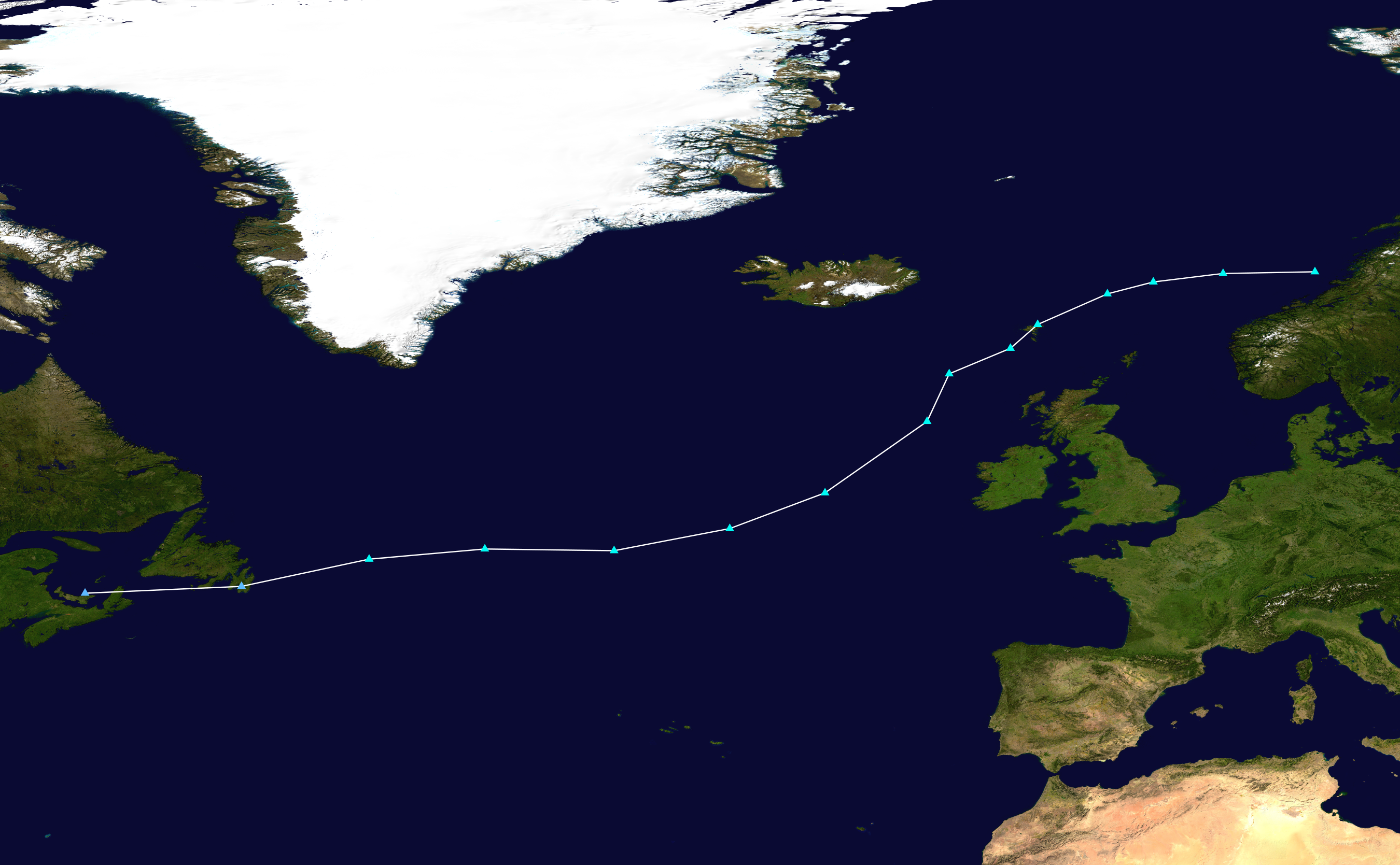
Path of Storm Eva Map key Saffir–Simpson scale Tropical depression (≤38 mph, ≤62 km/h) Tropical storm (39–73 mph, 63–118 km/h) Category 1 (74–95 mph, 119–153 km/h) Category 2 (96–110 mph, 154–177 km/h) Category 3 (111–129 mph, 178–208 km/h) Category 4 (130–156 mph, 209–251 km/h) Category 5 (≥157 mph, ≥252 km/h) Unknown Storm type Tropical cyclone Subtropical cyclone Extratropical cyclone, remnant low, tropical disturbance, or monsoon depression

=== Forecasts ===
Eva was the fifth storm to be officially named by Met Éireann on 22 December 2015. An orange wind warning was issued for counties Clare, Galway, Mayo, Sligo and Donegal on the same day. Gales were also expected in the northwest of the United Kingdom, with storm force winds over parts of the Outer Hebrides. There were fears that the storm could cause further disruption to Cumbria in England, where areas were already dealing with the aftermath of flooding from Storm Desmond and in some cases had been flooded twice already. The army and Environment Agency staff were called in to be on stand-by to bolster flood defences.

== Impact ==
Rain associated with the passage of Eva caused disruption when rivers burst their banks in the Cumbrian towns of Appleby, Keswick and Kendal on the 22 December. Appleby received three to four feet of flood water. The village of Glenridding was flooded for the third time in the month. Six thousand houses in Ireland were left without power. In London, Secretary of State for Environment, Food and Rural Affairs Liz Truss convened a COBRA meeting to decide on emergency measures, which included the deployment of soldiers from the 2nd Battalion, Duke of Lancaster's Regiment to the affected areas. On 24 December, flood defence gates were closed in Carlisle, Keswick and Cockermouth to limit the damage expected from rainfall and 20 water pumps and two kilometres (1.2 mi) of temporary flood barriers were transported to northern England. Ferries operating between Dublin and Holyhead were cancelled due to bad weather on the Irish Sea.
