= Storm Desmond =

Extratropical cyclone in December 2015

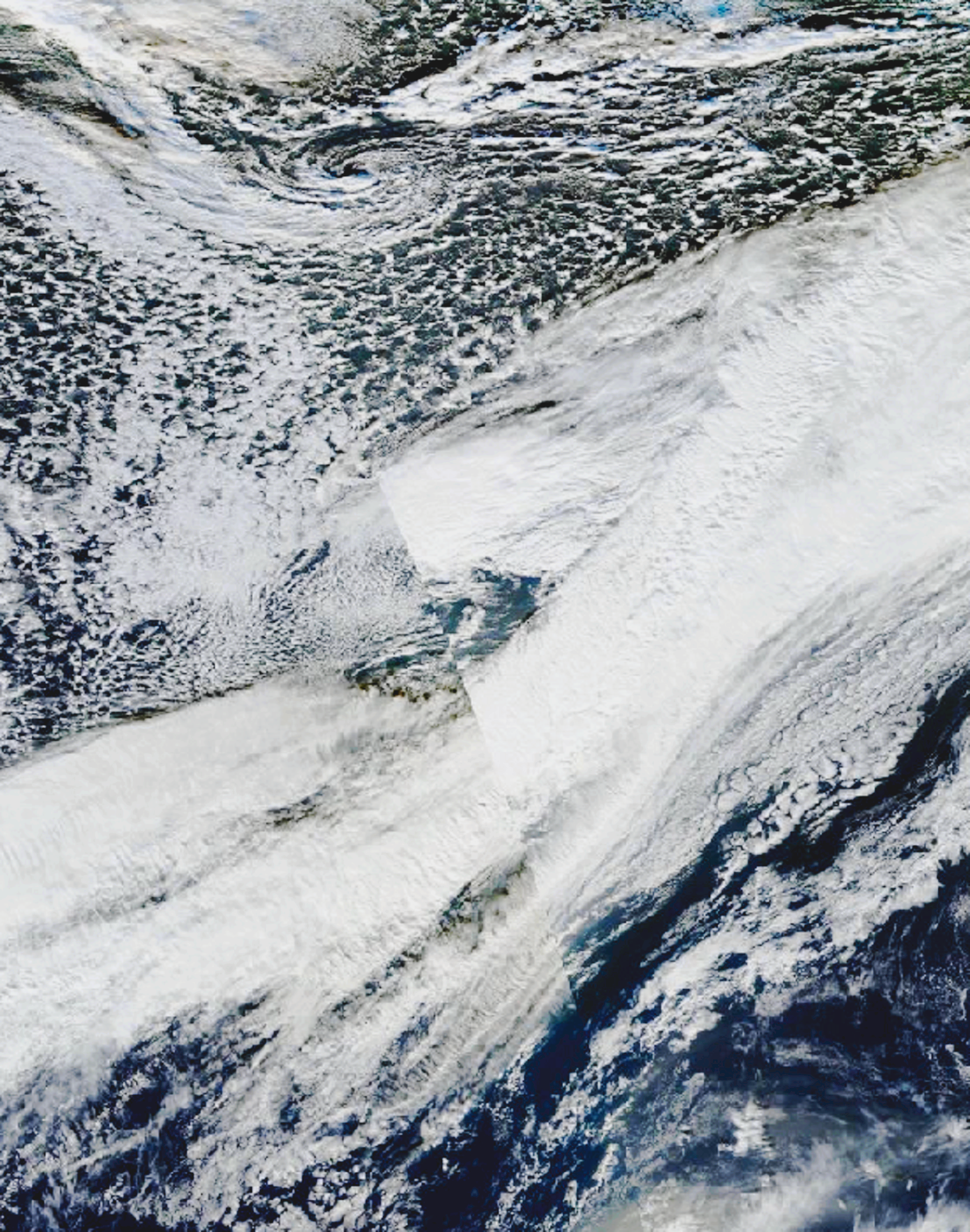
- Desmond on 5 December 2015

Meteorological history
- Formed: 3 December 2015
- Dissipated: 8 December 2015

Extratropical cyclone
- Highest winds: 81 mph (130 km/h)
- Highest gusts: 112 mph (180 km/h) (Aonach Mòr, Scottish Highlands)
- Lowest pressure: 939 mb (27.7 inHg)

Overall effects
- Casualties: 3
- Damage: ≥ £870 million (≥ €970 million) (2015)
- Areas affected: Ireland, Isle of Man, United Kingdom, Iceland, Norway, Sweden
- Power outages: 46,300
- Part of the 2015–16 UK and Ireland windstorm season

Storm Desmond was an extratropical cyclone and fourth named storm of the 2015–16 UK and Ireland windstorm season, notable for directing a plume of moist air, known as an atmospheric river, which brought record amounts of orographic rainfall to upland areas of northern Atlantic Europe and subsequent major floods.

In the United Kingdom, the worst affected areas were centred on Cumbria, parts of Lancashire, and the Scottish Borders. In Ireland, the worst affected areas were in the Shannon River Basin, in the west and Irish midlands. Severe rain and some flooding was also reported in Northumberland, North Wales and Yorkshire. Disruption from flooding, high winds, and damage to infrastructure led to the suspension of hundreds of rail services across the country, with the West Coast Main Line closed for several days due to flooding and a landslide. Sports fixtures were also cancelled and more than 43,000 homes across the north of England were left without power, as well as over 2,000 homes in the Republic of Ireland and around 700 in Wales. The extent of damage caused in such a short period across wide areas brought into focus the performance of UK central government flood defence strategies.

The expected heavy rainfall was considered to be an extreme weather event by the Norwegian Meteorological Institute, who named it Synne. The Free University of Berlin named the low Ted, as part of its Adopt–a–vortex programme.

== Meteorological history ==
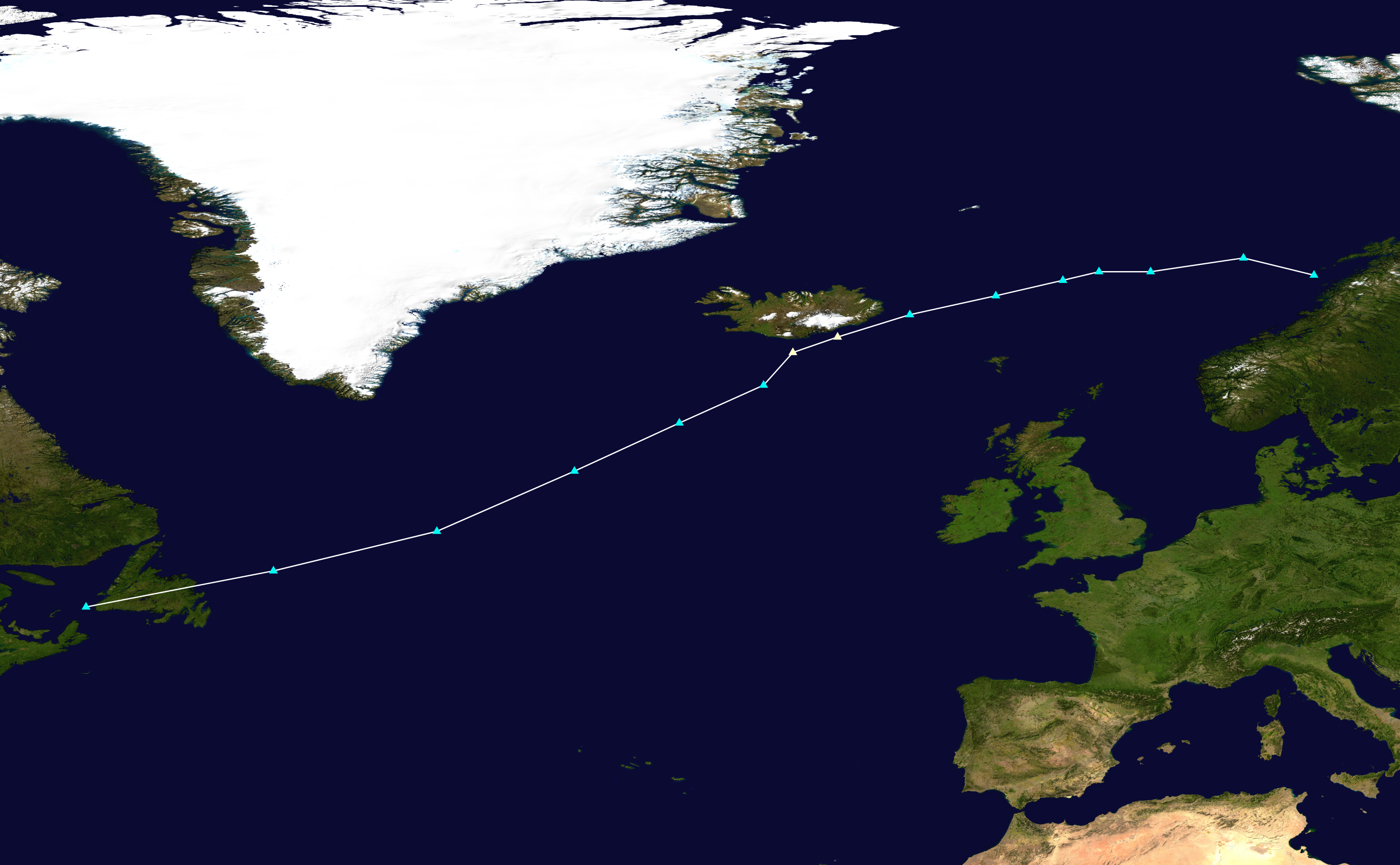
Path of Storm Desmond. Map key Saffir–Simpson scale Tropical depression (≤38 mph, ≤62 km/h) Tropical storm (39–73 mph, 63–118 km/h) Category 1 (74–95 mph, 119–153 km/h) Category 2 (96–110 mph, 154–177 km/h) Category 3 (111–129 mph, 178–208 km/h) Category 4 (130–156 mph, 209–251 km/h) Category 5 (≥157 mph, ≥252 km/h) Unknown Storm type Tropical cyclone Subtropical cyclone Extratropical cyclone, remnant low, tropical disturbance, or monsoon depression

=== Forecasts ===
On 4 December, the Met Office issued a yellow warning for wind across most of the north of the UK, with gusts expected to reach 70 mph (110 km/h) in south-west Scotland. Yellow warnings had also been given for rain in Northern Ireland, the north of Wales and central Scotland. An amber warning for rain was issued in parts of central and southern Scotland, Tayside and Fife; forecasting up to 200 mm (7.9 in) of rain on high ground over a 30-hour period. Met Éireann issued a status red rainfall warning for areas of Connacht, as well as counties Donegal, Clare and Kerry, with Clare County Council issuing a flood warning.

On 5 December, the Met Office issued a red severe weather warning for rain in Cumbria, with 150 mm (5.9 in) to 200 mm (7.9 in) expected in some places. It was the first such warning since storm Tini in February 2014. The Environment Agency had severe flood warnings in place for parts of the River Tyne in Northumberland and across Cumbria.

=== Weather warnings ===
==== United Kingdom ====
Weather warnings in the United Kingdom are issued by the Met Office.

Warning Severity	Event	Date	Areas affected
Red	Rain	5–6 December	North West England; SW Scotland, Lothian & Borders
Orange	Rain	5–6 December	Central, Tayside & Fife; North East England; Strathclyde; Yorkshire & Humber
Orange	Wind	5–6 December	North East England; North West England; SW Scotland, Lothian Borders; and Yorkshire & Humber
Yellow	Rain	5–6 December	Grampian; Highlands & Eilean Siar; Northern Ireland; Wales
Yellow	Wind	5–6 December	Central, Tayside & Fife; East Midlands; Grampian; Highlands & Eilean Siar; Northern Ireland; Strathclyde; Wales; West Midlands

==== Republic of Ireland ====
Weather warnings in the Republic of Ireland are issued by Met Éireann.

Warning Severity	Event	Date	Areas affected
Red	Rain	5 December	Connacht and counties Clare, Donegal and Kerry
Orange	Rain	5 December	Counties Cavan, Cork and Limerick
Orange	Wind	5 December	Counties Clare, Cork, Donegal, Galway, Kerry, Leitrim, Mayo, Sligo, Waterford, Wexford and Wicklow
Yellow	Rain	5 December	Leinster and counties Monaghan, Tipperary and Waterford
Yellow	Wind	5 December	Counties Carlow, Cavan, Dublin, Kildare, Kilkenny, Laois, Limerick, Longford, Louth, Meath, Monaghan, Offaly, Roscommon, Tipperary and Westmeath
Orange	Rain	11 December	Counties Clare, Cork and Kerry
Yellow	Rain	11 December	Connacht, Leinster and counties Limerick, Tipperary and Waterford
Yellow	Rain	15 December	Counties Cork, Kerry and Waterford

=== Weather records ===
Storm Desmond broke the United Kingdom's 24-hour rainfall record, with 341.4 mm (13.44 in) of rain falling in Honister Pass, Cumbria, on 5 December. The previous record was set in 2009, also in Cumbria, when 316.4 mm (12.46 in) of rain fell in Seathwaite. The highest standard 09:00 GMT – 09:00 GMT rain day record however remains 279 mm (11.0 in) at Martinstown, Dorset set on 18 July 1955, as much of the historical data is recorded in this way. The 48‑hour rainfall record also looked set to be beaten, with Thirlmere reporting 405 mm (15.9 in) of rain falling up to 08:00 GMT on 6 December 2015, compared to the previous record of 395.6 mm (15.57 in) on 18–19 November 2009 at Seathwaite.

== Impact ==
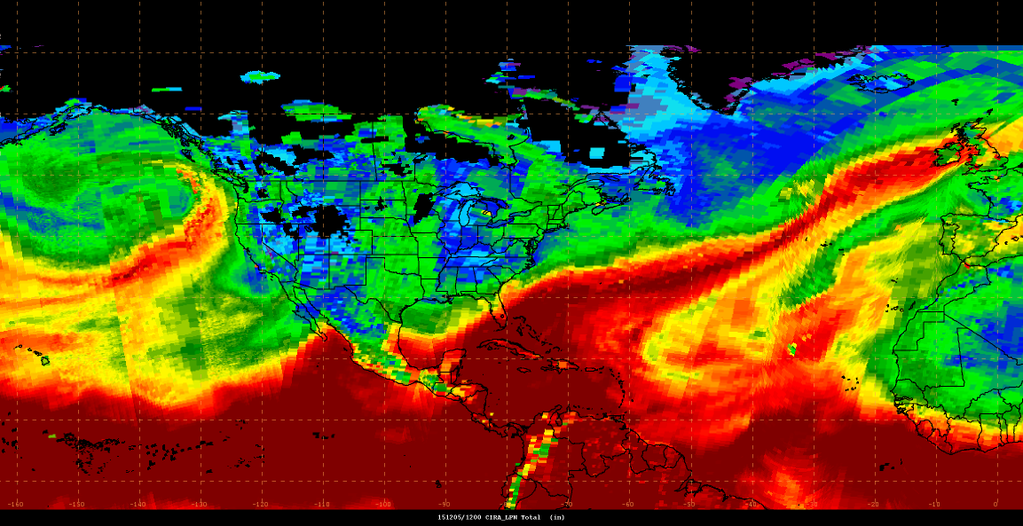
Satellite image of the plume of moist air, known as an atmospheric river, brought to Western Europe by Desmond

Desmond created an atmospheric river in its wake, bringing in moist air from the Caribbean to the British Isles. As a result, rainfall from Desmond was unusually heavy, with the Norwegian Meteorological Institute designating Desmond an extreme weather event as a result of the expected rainfall.

Heavy rainfall from Desmond caused severe disruption. Appleby, Keswick and Kendal in the English county of Cumbria suffered blocked roads, collapsed bridges and some homes were evacuated; Cumbria Police declared the situation a "major incident". Many houses in Carlisle were flooded, and tens of thousands of properties in Lancaster lost power when a sub-station was flooded.

About 5,200 homes were flooded in Lancashire and Cumbria and approximately 1,000 people were evacuated from their homes in the town of Hawick in the Scottish Borders as a result of the River Teviot flooding. The River Nith burst its banks in Dumfries, flooding part of the town, with a major emergency being declared in Dumfries & Galloway as a result. Landslides and flooding closed some main roads in Scotland and Counties Down and Tyrone in Northern Ireland suffered road closures from fallen trees.

In the Republic of Ireland, the worst affected areas were the province of Connacht and counties Donegal, Westmeath, Tipperary, Limerick, Clare, Cork and Kerry. Multiple, particularly local, roads were closed as a result of rivers breaching their banks and excess rainfall. In Connacht, the damage was worst in Athleague, Ballinasloe, Carrick-on-Shannon, Claregalway, Crossmolina, Foxford and Galway city. Millions of euro worth of damage was caused in Bandon, Fermoy, Kenmare and Tralee, while the Blackpool area of Cork city was severely affected by a higher level of water flow in the River Lee. Heavy rain has also resulted in severe flooding in communities along the River Shannon, namely Athlone, Portumna, Shannon Harbour, Montpelier, Castleconnell, Clonlara, Parteen, Annacotty and Limerick city. The river breached its banks in Athlone on 9 December. Other areas affected due to heavy rainfall included Bray, Clonmel and Ennis. In Glaslough, County Monaghan, the body of a 70-year-old man was found when his car was believed to have become trapped in a dipped part of a flooded road.

Further heavy rainfall exacerbated existing problems on the Isle of Man, which had been struck by localised flash flooding on 3 December, with warnings that Desmond could bring more flooding and more damage to the island.

In Wales, heavy rainfall led to flooding close to Llandygai, near Bangor in Gwynedd, with RNLI coastguard helicopters rescuing one person from their car. Flooding was also reported on Anglesey, in parts of Powys and in and around the South Wales city of Swansea. Wind damage was reported in Llandudno as winds gusted to 83 mph within the Snowdonia National Park.

A 90-year-old man was killed after being blown into the side of a route 143 bus outside Finchley Central tube station in London by a sudden gust of wind around 12:35 GMT.

A waterfall appeared at Malham Cove for a short time due to heavy rainfall. This had not previously happened in living memory.

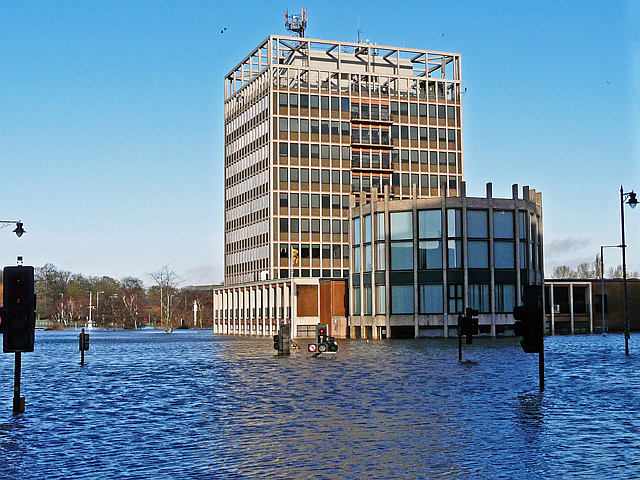
Carlisle Civic Centre in the floodwater, December 2015

=== Electricity ===
Around 43,000 homes were left without power on 4 December in North East England, Yorkshire and Lincolnshire as a result of the storm, with 38,500 homes having power restored within 24 hours. 621 homes in the North Yorkshire town of Leyburn were left without power due to storm damage during the evening of 4 December, with 428 homes being reconnected to the power grid by Northern Powergrid later that day; the remaining 190 had their power restored on 5 December. In addition, over 2,000 homes were left without power in the Republic of Ireland as a result of Storm Desmond, mainly along the country's Atlantic west coast. Flooding led to at least 700 homes in parts of Wales being left without power, with power faults being reported in Corwen in Denbighshire, in Bala in Gwynedd, and in Trefriw and Llanrwst in Conwy county. On the night of 5 December, the city of Lancaster in North West England saw 61,000 houses lose power when its electrical substation was submerged in flood water, alongside the city's bus station and local supermarket. Houses in the surrounding towns of Morecambe, Heysham and Carnforth also lost power and two nearby Universities, Lancaster University and the Lancashire Campus of the University of Cumbria, were forced to evacuate students, cancel teaching and postpone deadlines. Mobile generators had restored electricity to most homes by 7 December when unforeseen damage caused up to 42,000 to lose power again, resulting in many being left without electricity for three consecutive nights.

=== Transport ===
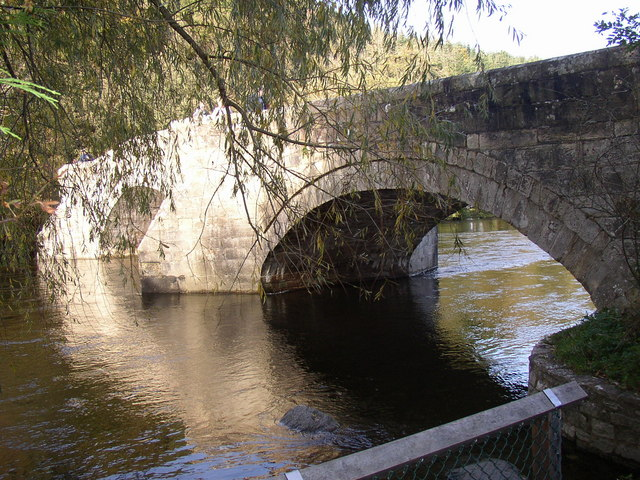
Pooley Bridge at Pooley Bridge, Cumbria washed away on 6 December. The bridge had stood since 1764.

There was major disruption to rail services in the north of England and in Scotland on 5 and 6 December, affecting services operated by Abellio ScotRail, First TransPennine Express, Northern Rail and Virgin Trains West Coast, as well as the Caledonian Sleeper. As a result of flooding and landslides along the West Coast Main Line (WCML) between Preston and Carlisle, all services between northern England and Scotland via the WCML were suspended on 6 December, with passengers advised not to travel.

As a result of this, the Caledonian Sleeper overnight service was forced to divert via the East Coast Main Line to avoid the WCML closure, while First TransPennine Express and Virgin Trains services were suspended entirely north of Preston. Abellio ScotRail suspended services between Carlisle and Glasgow Central. In addition, Northern Rail suspended all of their services north of Preston as well as services between Carlisle and Barrow-in-Furness, Hexham, Lancaster and Skipton as a result of high winds, severe flooding and landslides across the north-west of England. The ongoing weather situation resulted in National Rail declaring 'major disruption' across the north of England.

Arriva Trains Wales services between Bangor and Holyhead were suspended due to flooding, while services into and out of Chester were suspended due to high winds creating debris on the railway line, including a bus shelter, which was struck by a train prior to service being suspended.

Dozens of domestic, UK and international flights were cancelled at Dublin Airport on 5 December due to high winds, severely affecting carriers such as Aer Lingus and Ryanair. Strong crosswinds caused difficult conditions for landing aircraft at many airports, including Leeds Bradford Airport, although many UK airports escaped significant disruption regardless. A 200-year-old bridge in the Isle of Man collapsed amid severe flooding

River Tyne in spate at Corbridge on 5th December 2015

=== Sport ===
A number of Scottish football fixtures scheduled for 5 December were postponed as a result of Desmond. In the Scottish Premiership, three fixtures were postponed: the match between Celtic and Hamilton Academical and the match between Partick Thistle and Motherwell were both postponed due to waterlogged pitches following heavy rainfall, while the match between Hearts and Inverness Caledonian Thistle was postponed due to high winds. In addition, two Scottish Championship fixtures, one Scottish League One fixture and two Scottish Cup fixtures were also postponed on 5 December.

Desmond also impacted English football; in the National League, the fixture between Barrow and Boreham Wood was postponed on 5 December, while Football League Two side Carlisle United's Brunton Park stadium was flooded with several feet of water on 6 December. Carlisle United played home fixtures in December and January at grounds in Preston, Blackpool and Blackburn.

In Scottish rugby, the Pro12 fixture between Glasgow Warriors and Leinster was postponed due to a waterlogged pitch on 5 December.

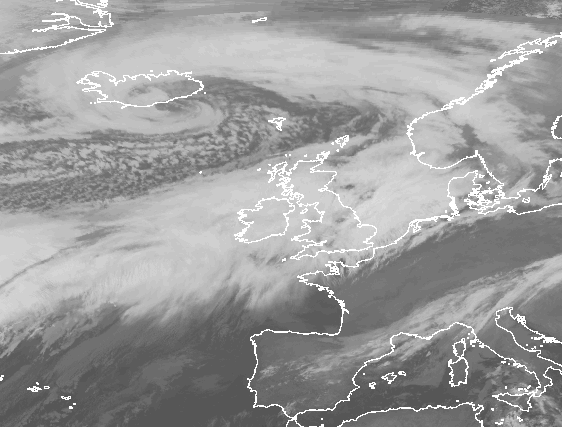
IR Satellite image of low Desmond centred close to Iceland

== Subsequent flooding ==
The village of Glenridding flooded for a second time on 9 December. Widespread flooding was expected after heavy rains on Boxing Day as a result of Storm Eva, with the Met Office issuing a red warning for parts of Cumbria, Lancashire and surrounding areas

== Aftermath ==
Expensive flood defence systems were proven ineffective and in some cases appeared to increase the problem. Professor Dieter Helm, Chair of the UK government's Natural Capital Committee stated in January 2016: "Flooding crises tend to follow an established pattern. First, there is immediate help and assistance. Then second, there is a “review”. On occasions, this leads to a third stage of genuine reform, but in most cases “sticking plasters” are applied. These are incremental and often sensible, but typically fail to address the core issues and hence provide only a temporary respite. There are very good reasons why ”sticking plasters” will not work this time. The conventional approach to flood defence, carried out by the Environment Agency (EA), and financed largely by the Treasury, is at best inefficient. Sometimes it is even counterproductive, encouraging the sorts of land use and land management decisions that can actually make flooding worse in the medium term." The Chairman of the UK's Environment Agency, the body responsible for main river maintenance resigned in early 2016. The UK government House of Commons Select Committee for the environment challenged the Chief Executive Officer of the Environment Agency on its performance by stating: “You [Sir James Bevan, CEO] said "The capacity of a river doesn't matter!" You've got to be certain the leopard has changed its spots. And I will keep repeating this. You haven't really given us an answer as to whether you have monitored the situation. I'm fearful. You allowed the River Parrett [Somerset] to silt up, you allowed the Tone to silt up, you allowed the tributaries to silt up, and then it flooded.” The Committee added: “The EA don't provide [quotes for work] when doing projects so we can't compare like with like [with other project providers]. There is an argument for transparency on your spending... You say the right words and hold onto your power."

== See also ==
- Beaufort scale
- Cyclone Carmen
- 2009 Great Britain and Ireland floods
- Winter storm naming in the United Kingdom and Ireland
- 2009 Workington floods
- Storm Eva
- Teresa Mannion
