= Weather system naming in Europe =

Overview of storm naming in Europe

In Europe, the naming of weather systems is the responsibility of the national meteorological services belonging to the geographical area in which a weather system originates. These services collaborate to give the system a name, which is then used throughout Europe. This framework was set up beginning in 2013 by EUMETNET, a network of 33 European national meteorological services.

On the North Atlantic coast, the United Kingdom's Met Office, Ireland's Met Éireann and the Royal Netherlands Meteorological Institute (KNMI) collaborate on names. Other groups include the southwestern countries of Belgium, Luxembourg, France, Spain and Portugal, and the northern group of Denmark, Sweden and Norway. Several countries in central and eastern Europe use a naming scheme from the Free University of Berlin. Tropical storms crossing the Atlantic keep the name assigned by the United States National Hurricane Center.

== History ==
The practice of using names to identify weather systems goes back several centuries. Systems were often named after places, people or things they hit before the start of formal naming schemes.

Credit for the first usage of personal names for weather is generally given to the Queensland Government Meteorologist Clement Wragge, who named tropical cyclones and anticyclones between 1887–1907. Wragge used names drawn from the letters of the Greek alphabet, Greek and Roman mythology and female names, to describe weather systems over Australia, New Zealand and the Antarctic. After the new Australian government had failed to create a federal weather bureau and appoint him director, Wragge started naming cyclones after political figures.

This system of naming weather systems subsequently fell into disuse for several years after Wragge retired, until it was revived in the latter part of the Second World War. Despite falling into disuse the naming scheme was occasionally mentioned in the press, with an editorial published in the Launceston Examiner newspaper on 5 October 1935 that called for the return of the naming scheme.

== Criteria for naming storms ==
There is no universal definition of what constitutes a windstorm in Europe, nor is there a universally accepted system of naming storms. For example, in Greece, naming criteria were established for storms when the storm's forecasted winds are above 50 km/h (14 m/s; 27 kn; 31 mph) over land, with the wind expected to have a significant impact to infrastructures. In Denmark, a windstorm must have an hourly average windspeed of at least 90 km/h (25 m/s; 49 kn; 56 mph).

Naming conventions used in Europe are generally based on conditions that are forecast, not conditions that have actually occurred, as public awareness and preparedness are often cited as the main purpose of the naming schemes–for example, a reference. Therefore, an assignment of a storm name does not mean that a storm will actually develop.

Ahead of the winter of 2015-16, the United Kingdom's Met Office and the Irish Met Éireann announced that they would start naming winter storms, in order to take control and inject authority into a messy situation where the media was using a variety of names for weather events.

== EUMETNET naming groups ==
During 2013, in response to the increasing usage by the European media of common names for any meteorological depression that caused disruptive weather, a task force of the Working Group for the Cooperation between European Forecasters (WGCEF) of the European Meteorological Network (EUMETNET) established a pan-European naming scheme.

Group Name	Participating Countries/Services	Naming Criteria
Western Group	(United Kingdom) Met Office (Republic of Ireland) Met Éireann (Netherlands) KNMI	United Kingdom (Met Office): Uses an impact-based system. A name is issued if an Amber or Red warning is forecast. There is no fixed wind speed, as 60 mph in London causes more disruption than 60 mph in the Scottish Highlands. Ireland (Met Éireann): Similar to the UK, but more strictly aligned with Orange level wind warnings, which generally trigger at mean speeds of 65–80 km/h or gusts of 110–130 km/h. Netherlands (KNMI): Typically names a storm if an Orange or Red wind warning is issued, specifically focusing on gusts that pose a danger to high-profile vehicles and trees.
South-western Group	Météo-France (Spain) AEMET (Portugal) IPMA (Belgium) RMI (Luxembourg) MeteoLux	France (Météo-France): Names a storm when a "major" event is forecast, usually triggering an Orange wind alert (gusts typically >100 km/h inland or >120 km/h on coasts). Spain (AEMET): Uses a very specific threshold: an Orange or Red wind warning, which for most of Spain is defined by gusts exceeding 90–100 km/h (though this is lower in mountainous areas). Portugal (IPMA): Similar to Spain, triggering at Orange level wind warnings for the mainland or the Azores/Madeira. Belgium & Luxembourg: Follow the lead of France or the Netherlands; they name if they expect a Code Orange for wind.
Northern Group	MET Norway (Sweden) SMHI (Denmark) DMI	Denmark (DMI): One of the few with a strict numerical rule. A storm is named if the hourly average wind speed reaches at least 90 km/h (25 m/s). Norway (MET Norway): Names "Extreme Weather" (Ekstremvær) when weather will cause a danger to life and property. This is a Red level warning. Sweden (SMHI): Moves to a naming status when a Yellow (high impact) or Orange warning for wind or heavy snow is issued across a significant portion of the country.
Central Mediterranean Group	(Italy) Servizio Meteorologico (Slovenia) ARSO (Croatia) DHMZ (Montenegro) IHMS; Met Office Malta	Italy (Servizio Meteorologico): Coordinates with the group based on the European Meteoalarm system. They name when an Orange level alert is reached for wind, rain, or snow. Croatia (DHMZ) & Slovenia (ARSO): Use the "Orange" threshold, but they are particularly sensitive to the Bora wind, which can reach hurricane force even without a large cyclone. Malta: Names based on high-impact events in the Central Med, particularly those affecting shipping lanes and coastal infrastructure.
South-eastern Mediterranean Group	(Greece) HNMS (Cyprus) DoM (Israel) IMS	Greece (HNMS): Established a threshold of forecasted winds above 50 km/h over land, provided they expect significant socio-economic impact. Cyprus & Israel: Do not rely solely on wind; they name heatwaves (e.g., Storm Cleon) when temperatures are forecast to stay at dangerous levels for several days, or for severe dust storms.

The main objective of this project was to develop a project that would be operated by all of the European national meteorological services and used by the media as well as other agencies such as civil protection. For the purposes of the project, Europe was divided into six groups of neighbouring countries with similar weather and climate characteristics.

Should a system move from one area to another, it will retain the name it was assigned by the original weather service.

=== Central group (FUB naming) ===
This group includes Germany, Switzerland, Poland, Czechia, Austria, Hungary and Slovakia. It uses the naming scheme of the meteorology department of the Free University of Berlin (FUB).

The FUB names all high and low pressure systems that affect Europe, though they do not assign names to any actual storms. A windstorm that is associated with one of these pressure systems will at times be recognized by the name assigned to the associated pressure system by the FUB. Named windstorms that have been recognized by a European meteorological agency are described in this article.

The FUB's is the oldest naming system in Europe. It was developed by Karla Wege, a student at the Free University of Berlin's meteorological institute, who suggested that names should be assigned to all areas of low and high pressure that influenced the weather of Central Europe. The university subsequently started to name every area of high or low pressure within its weather forecasts, from a list of 260 male and 260 female names submitted by its students. The female names were assigned to areas of low pressure while male names were assigned to areas of high pressure.

The names were subsequently exclusively used by Berlin's media until February 1990, after which the German media started to commonly use the names, however, they were not officially approved by the German Meteorological Service Deutscher Wetterdienst. The DWD subsequently banned the usage of the names by their offices during July 1991, after complaints had poured in about the naming system. However, the order was leaked to the German press agency, Deutsche Presse-Agentur, who ran it as its lead weather story. Germany's ZDF television channel subsequently ran a phone in poll on 17 July 1991 and claimed that 72% of the 40,000 responses favoured keeping the names. This made the DWD pause and think about the naming system and these days the DWD accept the naming system and request that it is maintained.

During 1998 a debate started about whether it was discriminatory to name areas of high pressure with male names and the areas of low pressure with female names. The issue was subsequently resolved by alternating male and female names each year.

In November 2002 the "Adopt-a-Vortex" scheme was started, which allowed members of the public or companies to buy naming rights for a letter chosen by the buyer, that are then assigned alphabetically to high and low pressure areas in Europe during each year.

During 2021, the Meteorological Services of Germany, Austria, Switzerland, Poland, Czech Republic, Slovakia and Hungary started to use the names assigned to areas of low pressure by FU Berlin.

=== Unofficial naming groups ===
These groups do not officially name European windstorms, but they do recognise windstorms that other agencies have named that affect their countries.

- North-eastern group: Finland, Estonia, Latvia and Lithuania
- South-eastern Mediterranean group: Moldova, Romania, Serbia and Bulgaria

== Tropical cyclones ==
Tropical cyclones that form over the northern Atlantic Ocean are named by the United States National Hurricane Center, once they become tropical storms with 1-minute sustained winds of 65 km/h (20 m/s; 35 kn; 40 mph). From time to time, tropical cyclones or their remnants impact Europe and retain the name assigned to them by the United States National Hurricane Center.

== See also ==
- Winter storm naming in the United States
- Tropical cyclone naming
- Atlantic hurricane season
- European Centre for Medium-Range Weather Forecasts
- List of European windstorms
