= Meteoalarm =

European weather warning website

MeteoAlarm is a European weather warning website. Development by EUMETNET, the European Network of National Meteorological Services, began in 2002 and the website went live in 2007. MeteoAlarm is designed to consistently visualise awareness information from the MeteoAlarm Members, following an easily understandable colour code of yellow, orange, and red, to ensure coherent interpretation throughout Europe.

Pictograms and colour-coding convey meaning independent of the user's language. Strong winds, torrential rain, snow and ice, thunderstorms, and extreme temperatures are indicated. Weather conditions that could lead to increased risk such as storm surges, high waves, forest fires and avalanches are also shown.

== Colour coding ==
There are four colours to point out the weather conditions: green, yellow, orange, and red.

- Green - No dangerous weather is expected.
- Yellow - The weather is potentially dangerous, but unlikely to be extreme. Care is called for in activities that are dependent on the weather.
- Orange - There is severe weather that may cause damage or accidents. People are advised to take care, keep abreast of the latest developments in the weather, and take heed of advice given by the authorities.
- Red - Great danger is expected from extremely severe weather. Major damage and accidents are likely, in many cases with threat to life, over a wide area. People are advised to be extremely careful, pay close attention to bulletins and obey the instructions and advice given by the authorities. Exceptional safety measures may be taken.

A greyscale map is available for colour-blind users.

== Member countries ==
MeteoAlarm.org has been developed for EUMETNET, the European Network of National Meteorological Services who are members of the World Meteorological Organization (WMO). The National Meteorological Service of Austria (GeoSphere Austria) is the responsible member for this project and does the technical realisation. The National Meteorological Service of the Netherlands KNMI (Koninklijk Nederland's Meteorologisch Instituut) gave close support. This project is officially called the European Multiservice Meteorological Awareness (EMMA) Project.

The member countries of MeteoAlarm are: Austria, Belgium, Bosnia and Herzegovina, Bulgaria, Croatia, Cyprus, the Czech Republic, Denmark, Estonia, Finland, France, Germany, Greece, Hungary, Iceland, Ireland, Israel, Italy, Latvia, Lithuania, Luxembourg, Malta, Moldova, Montenegro, the Netherlands, North Macedonia, Norway, Poland, Portugal, Romania, Serbia, Slovakia, Slovenia, Spain, Sweden, Switzerland, Ukraine, and the United Kingdom.

== Award ==
The EMMA Project received in October 2008 the EMS (European Meteorological Society) Outreach & Communication Award for the website www.meteoalarm.org. The panel thought that this project was an excellent example of putting a bridge between weather services, science, and society.
