= EUMETNET =

Network of 31 European National Meteorological Services, based in Brussels, Belgium

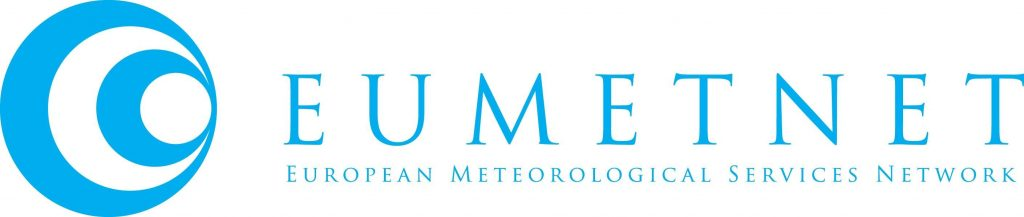

- EUMETNET members in blue and cooperating organisations in green.
- Formation: 1995
- Headquarters: Brussels, Belgium
- Website: https://www.eumetnet.eu/

EUMETNET (European Meteorological Network) is a network of 33 European National Meteorological Services based in Brussels, Belgium. It exists to provide a framework to organise co-operative programmes between the members in fields of meteorology, data processing and forecasting products.

== Members ==
Meteorological services of the following 33 countries are members of EUMETNET: Austria, Belgium, Croatia, Cyprus, Czech Republic, Denmark, Estonia, Finland, France, Montenegro, Germany, Greece, Hungary, Iceland, Ireland, Italy, Latvia, Lithuania, Luxembourg, Malta, Netherlands, North Macedonia, Norway, Poland, Portugal, Romania, Serbia, Slovakia, Slovenia, Spain, Sweden, Switzerland, and the United Kingdom.

=== Cooperating non-member states ===
Cooperating non-member states are: Andorra, Bosnia-Herzegovina, Bulgaria, Georgia, Israel, Moldova and Turkey.

== See also ==
- EUMETSAT
- ECMWF
- Meteoalarm
