= List of historical European windstorm names =

This list of historical European windstorm names includes notable extratropical cyclones that have impacted Europe and were assigned names by national meteorological services or academic institutions, in association with EUMETNET standards.

== Background and history ==
24-hour animation of Cyclone Xynthia crossing France

European windstorm names are used by national meteorological services in Europe to identify high-impact extratropical cyclones. Unlike the naming of tropical cyclones, which is managed globally by the World Meteorological Organization, European windstorm naming is coordinated through several regional groups under the EUMETNET framework.

The practice of naming these storms began formally in the 1950s by the Free University of Berlin. It was not until 2015 that national weather services starting with the Met Office and Met Éireann initiated official public naming schemes to improve disaster communication.

== Selection criteria, naming systems and eligibility ==
A storm's name only makes it on this list if:

- It was officially named by a national weather service of one of the EUMETNET observer groups.

What is not accepted:

- A storm name issued by Free University Berlin, as they name all high and low pressure areas over the continent, most of which are not eligible for storm naming criteria.

== Naming groups ==
Since 2015, the naming of high-impact windstorms has been coordinated by several regional groups within the EUMETNET framework. Each group maintains its own alphabetical list of names for each season.

Group Name	Participating Countries/Services	Established
Western Group	(United Kingdom) Met Office (Republic of Ireland) Met Éireann (Netherlands) KNMI	2015
South-western Group	Météo-France (Spain) AEMET (Portugal) IPMA (Belgium) RMI (Luxembourg) MeteoLux	2017
Northern Group	MET Norway (Sweden) SMHI (Denmark) DMI	2026
Central Mediterranean Group	(Italy) Servizio Meteorologico (Slovenia) ARSO (Croatia) DHMZ (Montenegro) IHMS; Met Office Malta	2021
South-eastern Mediterranean Group	(Greece) HNMS (Cyprus) DoM (Israel) IMS	2021

=== Historical Western group names ===
The following names were used from the lists submitted by the Western group for European windstorm naming.

(United Kingdom, Ireland and Netherlands)

2015-16	2016-17	2017-18	2018-19	2019-20	2020-21	2021-22	2022-23	2023-24	2024-25	2025-26	2026-27
Abigail	Angus	Aileen	Ali	Atiyah	Aiden	Arwen	Antoni	Agnes	Ashley	Amy	Austen
Barney	Barbara	Brian	Bronagh	Brendan	Bella	Barra	Betty	Babet	Bert	Bram	Boelo
Clodagh	Conor	Caroline	Callum	Ciara	Christoph	Corrie		Ciarán	Conall	Chandra	
Desmond	Doris	Dylan	Dierdre	Dennis	Darcy	Dudley		Debi	Darragh	Dave	
Eva	Ewan	Eleanor	Erik	Ellen	Evert	Eunice		Elin	Éowyn		
Frank		Fionn	Freya	Francis		Franklin		Fergus	Floris		
Gertrude		Georgina	Gareth					Gerrit			
Henry		Hector	Hannah					Henk			
Imogen								Isha			
Jake								Jocelyn			
Katie								Kathleen			
								Lilian			

=== Historical South-western group names ===
The following names were used from the lists submitted by the South-western group for European windstorm naming.

(France, Spain, Portugal, Belgium and Luxembourg)

2017-18	2018-19	2019-20	2020-21	2021-22	2022-23	2023-24	2024-25	2025-26	2026-27
Ana	Adrian	Amélie	Alex	Aurore	Armand	Aline	Aitor	Alice	Adam
Bruno	Beatriz	Bernardo	Barbara	Blas	Béatrice	Bernard	Berenice	Benjamin	Bruna
Carmen	Carlos	Cecilia	Clement	Celia	Cláudio	Celine	Caetano	Claudia	Charles
David	Diana	Daniel	Dora	Diego	Denise	Domingos	Dorothea	Davide	
Emma	Etienne	Elsa	Ernest	Evelyn	Efraín	Elisa	Enol	Emilia	
Felix	Flora	Fabien	Filomena		Fien	Frederico	Floriane	Francis	
Gisele	Gabriel	Gloria	Gaetan		Gérard	Geraldine	Garoe	Goretti	
Hugo	Helena	Hervé	Hortense		Hannelore	Hipolito	Herminia	Harry	
Irene	Isaias	Inès	Ignacio		Isaack	Irene	Ivo	Ingrid	
	Julia	Jorge	Justine		Juliette	Juan	Jana	Joseph	
	Kyllian	Karine	Karim		Kamiel	Karlotta	Konrad	Kristin	
	Laura	Leon	Lola		Larisa	Louis	Laurence	Leonardo	
	Miguel	Myriam			Mathis	Monica	Martinho	Marta	
		Norberto			Noa	Nelson	Nuria	Nils	
		Odette			Oscar	Olivia	Olivier	Oriana	
					Patrícia	Pierrick		Pedro	
						Renata		Regina	
								Samuel	
								Therese	

=== Historical Central Mediterranean group names ===
The following names were used from the lists submitted by the Central Mediterranean group for European windstorm naming.

(Italy, Slovenia, Croatia, Bosnia & Herzegovina, Montenegro, North Macedonia and Malta)

2021-22	2022-23	2023-24	2024-25	2025-26	2026-27
Apollo	Ana	Alexis	Atena	Alessio	Agneta
Bianca	Bogdan	Bettina	Boris	Barbara	
Ciril	Clio	Ciro	Cassandra	Cassio	
Diana	Dino	Dorothea	Dionisio	Deborah	
	Eva	Emil	Elena	Erminio	
	Fobos	Fedra	Felix		
	Gaia	Gori	Gabri		
	Helios		Hans		
	Ilina		Ines		
	Leon		Lukas		
	Minerva				
	Nino				
	Olga				
	Petar				
	Rea				

=== Historical Eastern Mediterranean group names ===
The following names were used from the lists submitted by the Eastern Mediterranean group for European windstorm naming.

(Greece, Israel and Cyprus)

2021-22	2022-23	2023-24	2024-25	2025-26	2026-27
Athina	Ariel	Avgi	Alexandros	Adel	
Ballos	Barbara		Bora	Byron	
Carmel	Cleon*		Coral		
Diomedes	Daniel				
Elpis	Elias				
Filippos					
Genesis					

Asterisked (*) entities that were named that were not windstorms, as the SE Med group also names non-wind events like heat waves (e.g., Cleon).

=== Historical Northern group names ===
The following names were used from the lists submitted by the Northern group for European windstorm naming. Since 2026 the Northern group have been using a unified lists of names, starting with Anna.

(Norway, Denmark and Sweden)

2020-2025	2026–2030
Didrik (2020)	Anna (2026)
Frank (2020)	
Gyda (2021)	
Malik (2022)
Otto (2023)	
Hans (2023)	
Pia (2023)	
Ingunn (2024)	
Rolf (2024)	
Jakob (2024)	
Johannes (2025)	

== See also ==
- Weather of: 2026
- Tropical cyclones in: 2026
