= Storm Carmel =

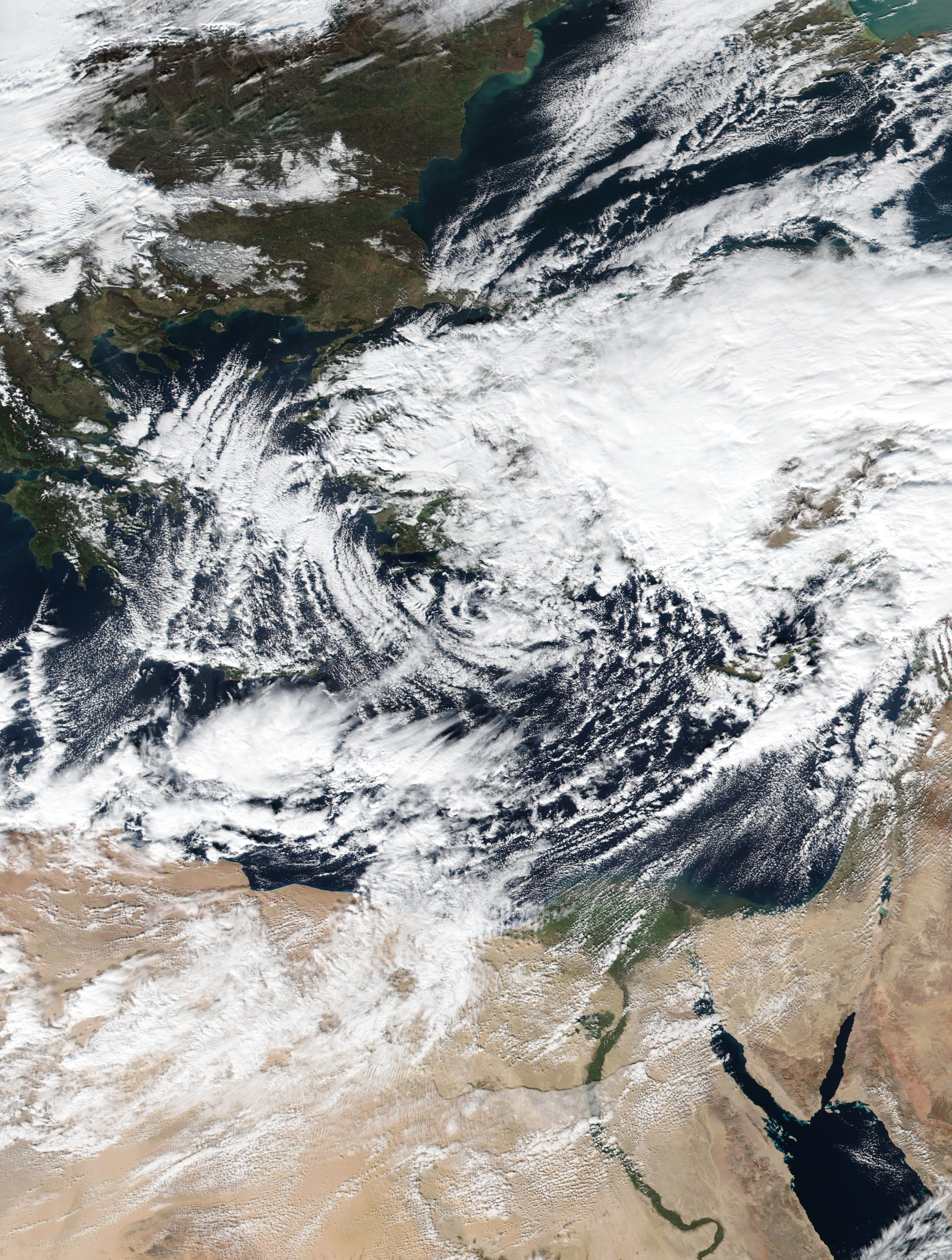
- Area affected: Greece, Cyprus, Israel
- Date of impact: 16 December 2021 - 22 December 2021
- Maximum wind gust: 107 km/h (66 mph; 58 kn)
- Fatalities: 4 dead, 1 Injured
- Power outages: Unknown

Storm Carmel was an extratropical cyclone that was part of the 2021–22 European windstorm season. Storm Carmel was named by the Hellenic National Meteorological Service on 16 December 2021. It is the first storm in the history of Israel to receive a name.

== Preparations ==
Israel is expected to be impacted by winter storm Carmel.

== Impact ==
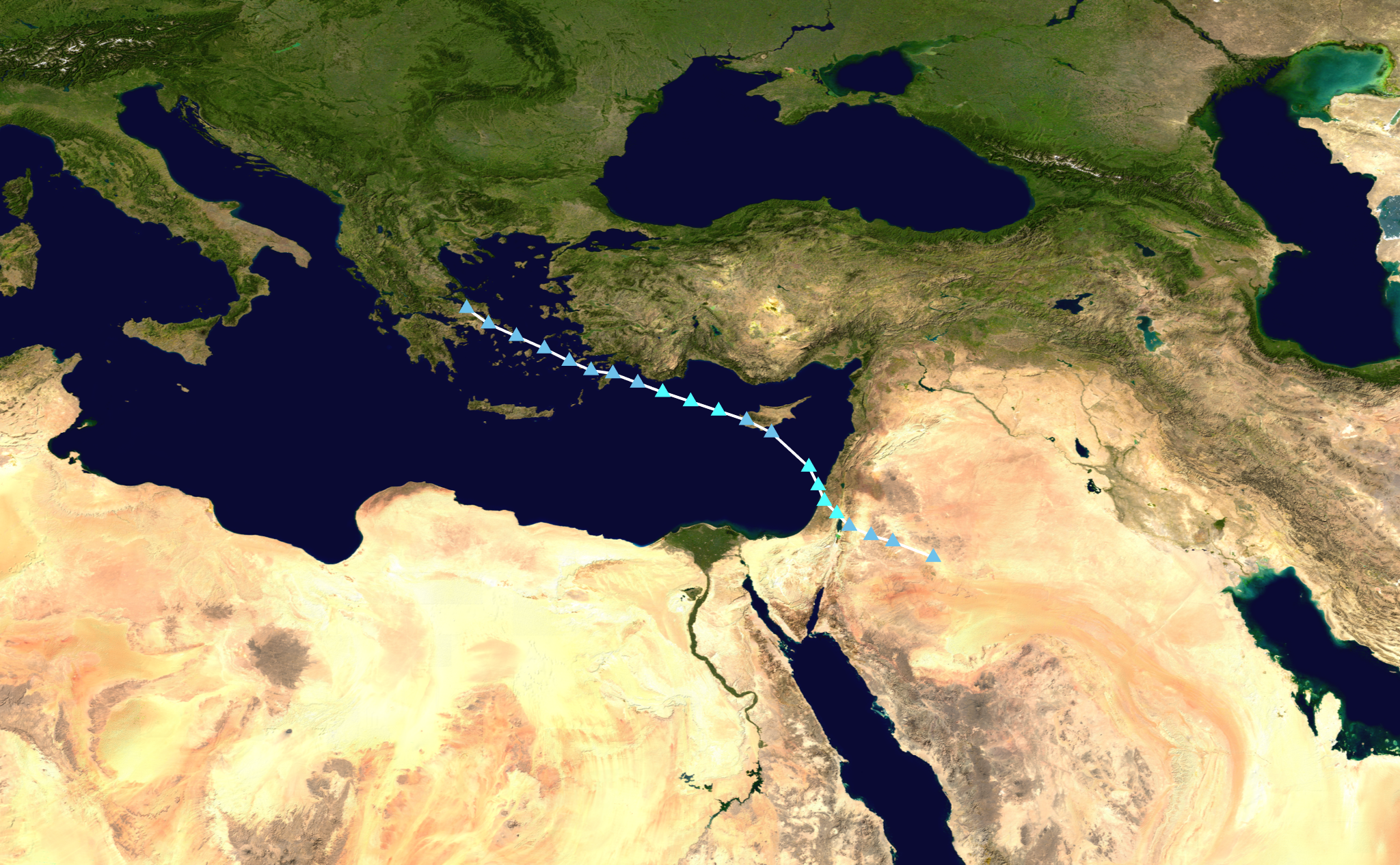
Map plotting the storm's track and intensity, according to the Saffir–Simpson scale Map key Saffir–Simpson scale Tropical depression (≤38 mph, ≤62 km/h) Tropical storm (39–73 mph, 63–118 km/h) Category 1 (74–95 mph, 119–153 km/h) Category 2 (96–110 mph, 154–177 km/h) Category 3 (111–129 mph, 178–208 km/h) Category 4 (130–156 mph, 209–251 km/h) Category 5 (≥157 mph, ≥252 km/h) Unknown Storm type Tropical cyclone Subtropical cyclone Extratropical cyclone, remnant low, tropical disturbance, or monsoon depression

Israel was heavily affected by Storm Carmel. At Ben Gurion Airport, more rain fell in two days than the monthly average. Mikveh Israel saw 175 millimetres (6.9 in) of rainfall over those two days (147 millimetres (5.8 in) in one day), the third highest recorded rainfall there in the past century. Cyprus suffered no significant damage in the storm. In Israel, two homeless people died in the coastal city of Bat Yam and another in Tel Aviv, from hypothermia. Another death happened because of a car accident caused by torrential rains, bringing the death toll up to 4.

== See also ==
- Weather of 2021
- Storm Barra (Previous storm in the 2021–22 European windstorm season)
