= February 2021 Greek cold wave =

Weather event in Greece

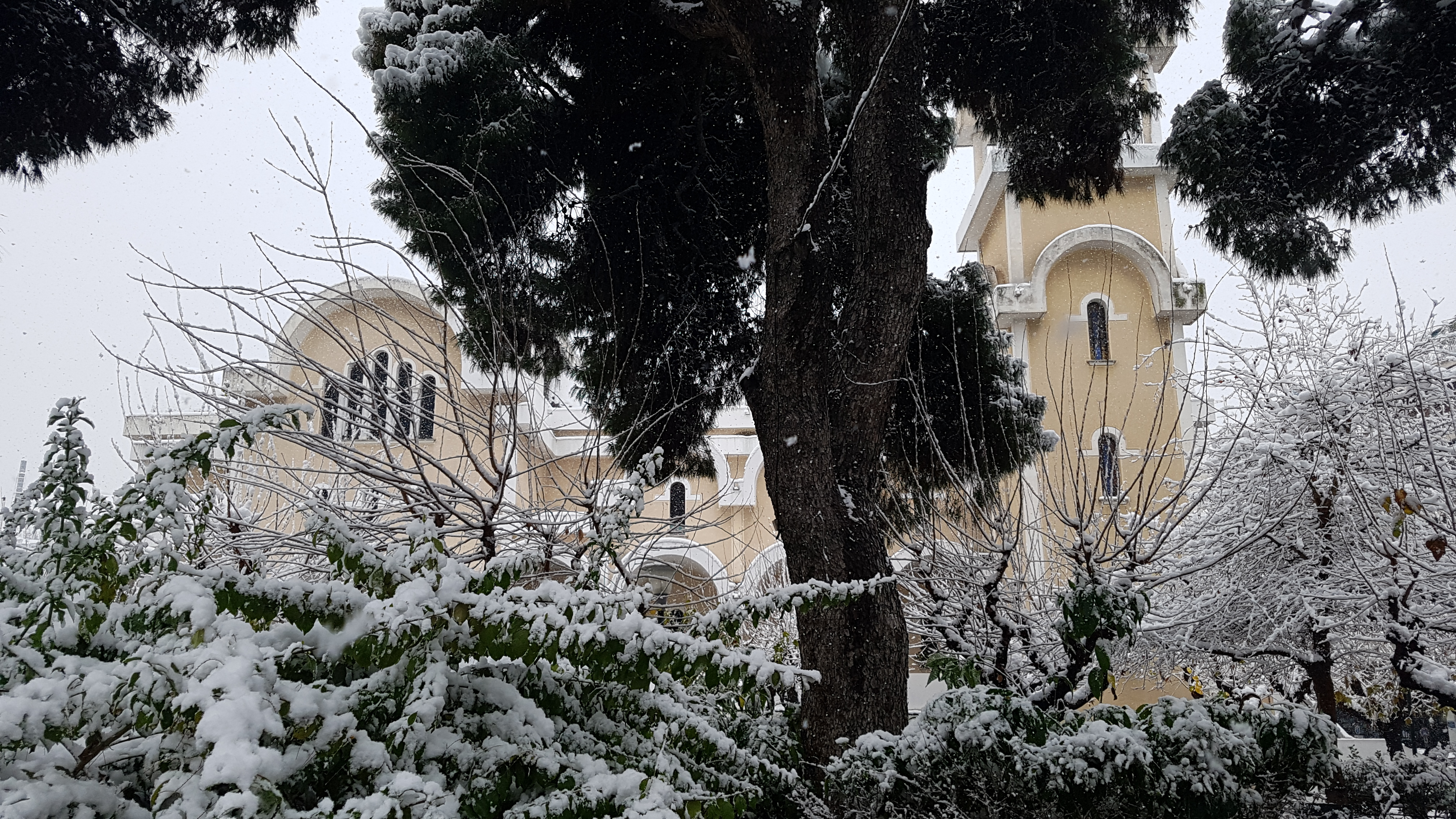
- Trees under a blanket of snow with the Agios Meletios Church in Athens as a backdrop on 16 February

Meteorological history
- Formed: 13 February 2021
- Dissipated: 16 February 2021

Cold wave
- Lowest temp: −19.9 °C (−3.8 °F)

Overall effects
- Fatalities: 3
- Areas affected: Central Europe, Southern Europe, Turkey, Greece

A cold wave, named Cold Front Medea, arrived over Greece on February 13, 2021, and lasted through February 16. The cold wave brought strong winds, with gusts over 60 miles per hour (97 km/h), and the heaviest snowfall Northern Greece had experienced since 1996. The weather resulted in the deaths of at least 3 people.

== Affected Areas ==
The areas affected by the cold wave were widespread, with the snow reaching coastal areas of mainland Greece and, with some exceptions, on the Aegean Islands, and on Crete. The snowfall in these areas was particularly significant according to the Hellenic National Meteorological Service (HNMS) as these areas rarely see snow. During the cold front, the snow heavily affected the regions of Attica, Boeotia, and Evia, causing damage and complications to infrastructure in those regions.

== Impact ==
Cold Front Medea caused widespread disruptions to sea and road traffic, with debris and weather conditions making certain roads inaccessible, and causing flights and ferries to be canceled or delayed. According to a spokesperson for the Hellenic Fire Service, the service received an increased number of calls about blocked roadways as well as requests from people trapped in their vehicles requesting transport to a safe location. Some vehicles were reportedly abandoned on the closed highways.

The weather also caused power outages in Athens and a number of its suburbs. According to the Hellenic Fire Service, the power outages temporarily halted the administration of COVID-19 vaccines in the Athens area.

=== Casualties ===
At least three deaths were attributed to the cold wave. On Euboea, two men with breathing complications died of respiratory arrest after a blackout disabled their breathing equipment. In Kaminaki, on Crete, a farmer in his 60s was found dead, in the snow, next to his granary.

== Recorded temperatures ==
The cold front brought unseasonably cold temperatures, and the coldest day recorded was on February 16. The lowest temperature was logged at −19 °C (−2 °F), in the northern city of Florina. On February 16, temperatures were recorded at −0.8 °C (30.6 °F) in Athens, −0.7 °C (30.7 °F) in Alimos, and −0.6 °C (30.9 °F) in Piraeus.

== Gallery ==
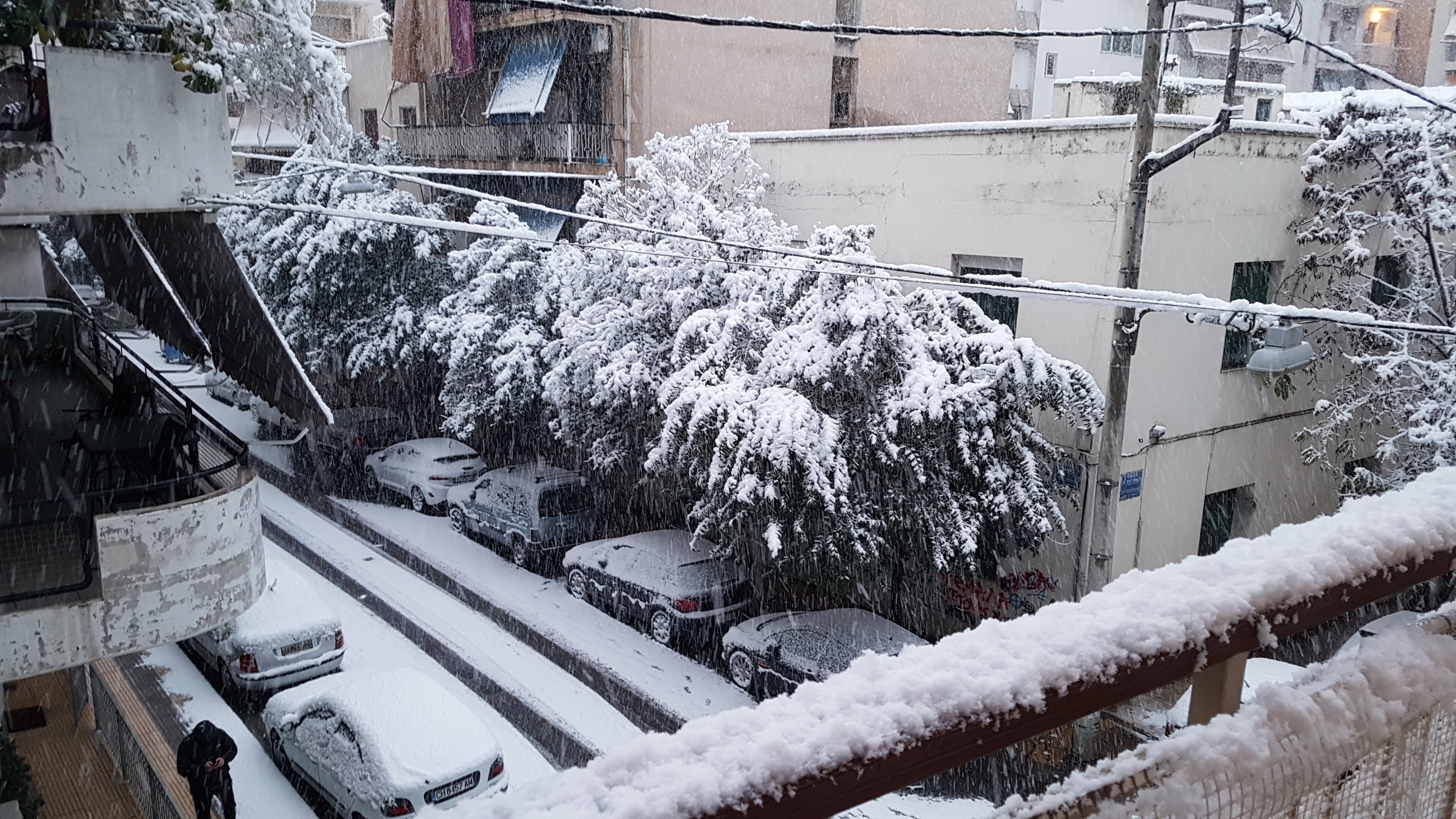
Snow in the Sepolia district in Athens

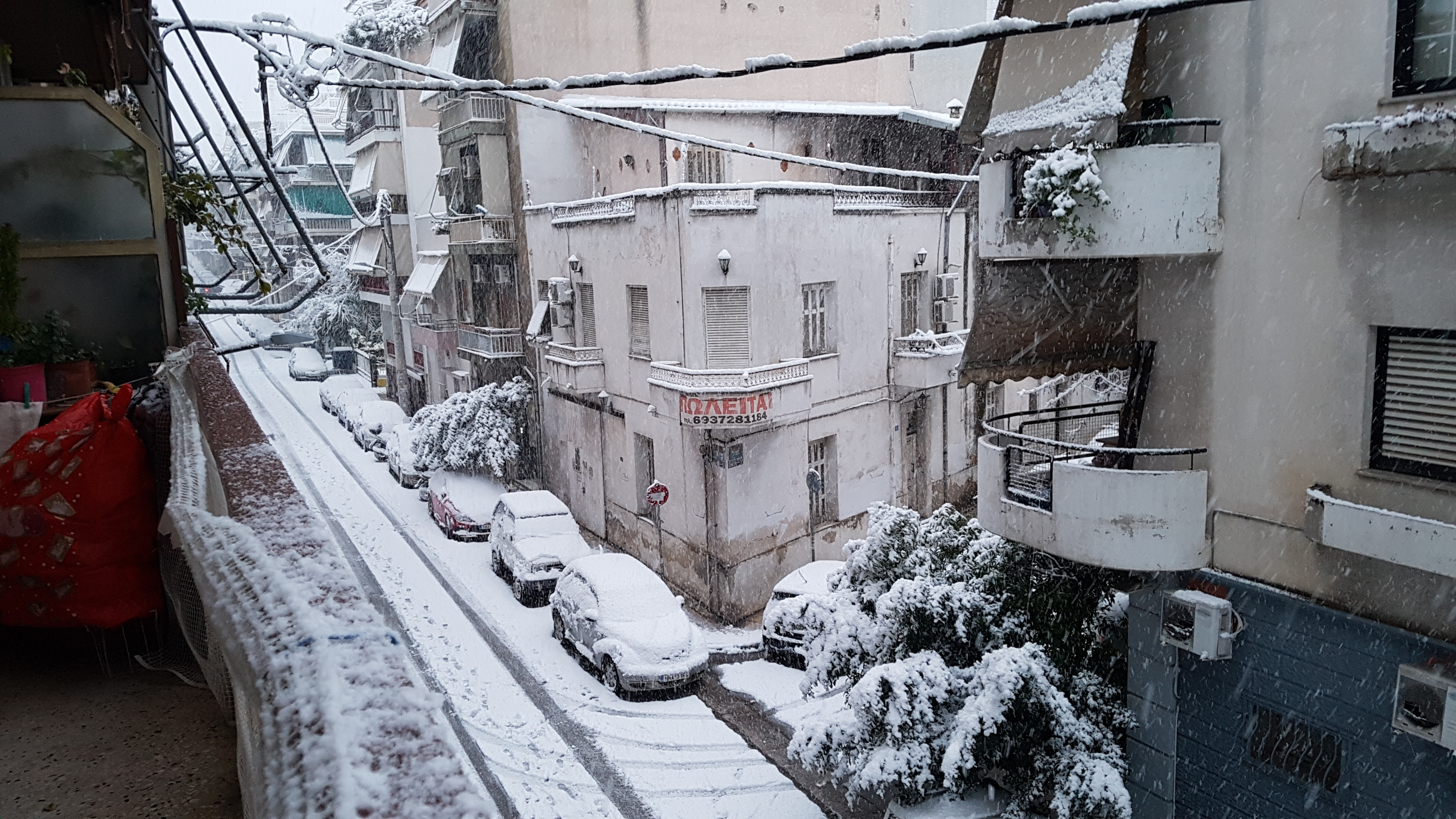
Snow in the Sepolia district in Athens

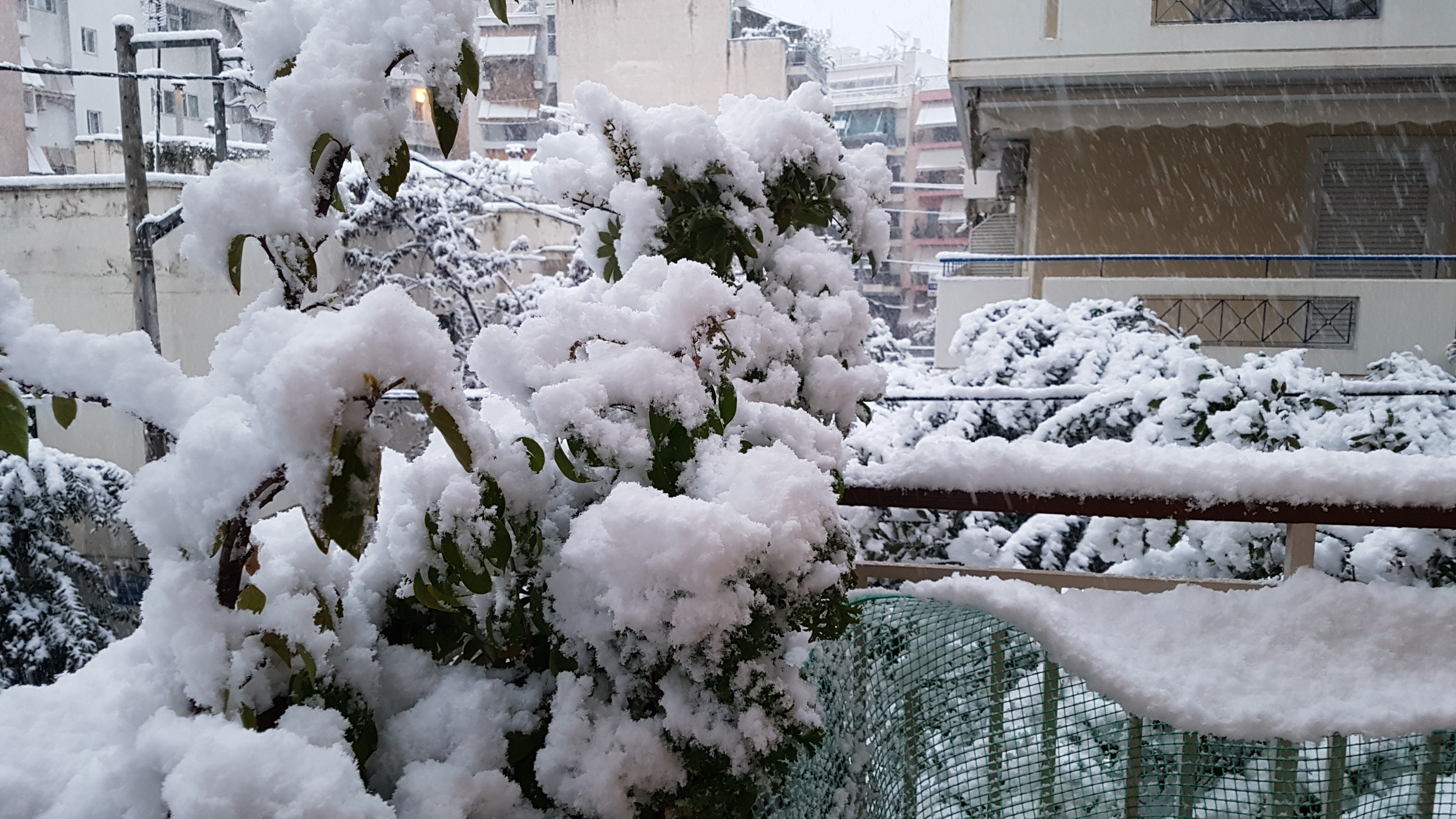
Snow in the Sepolia district in Athens

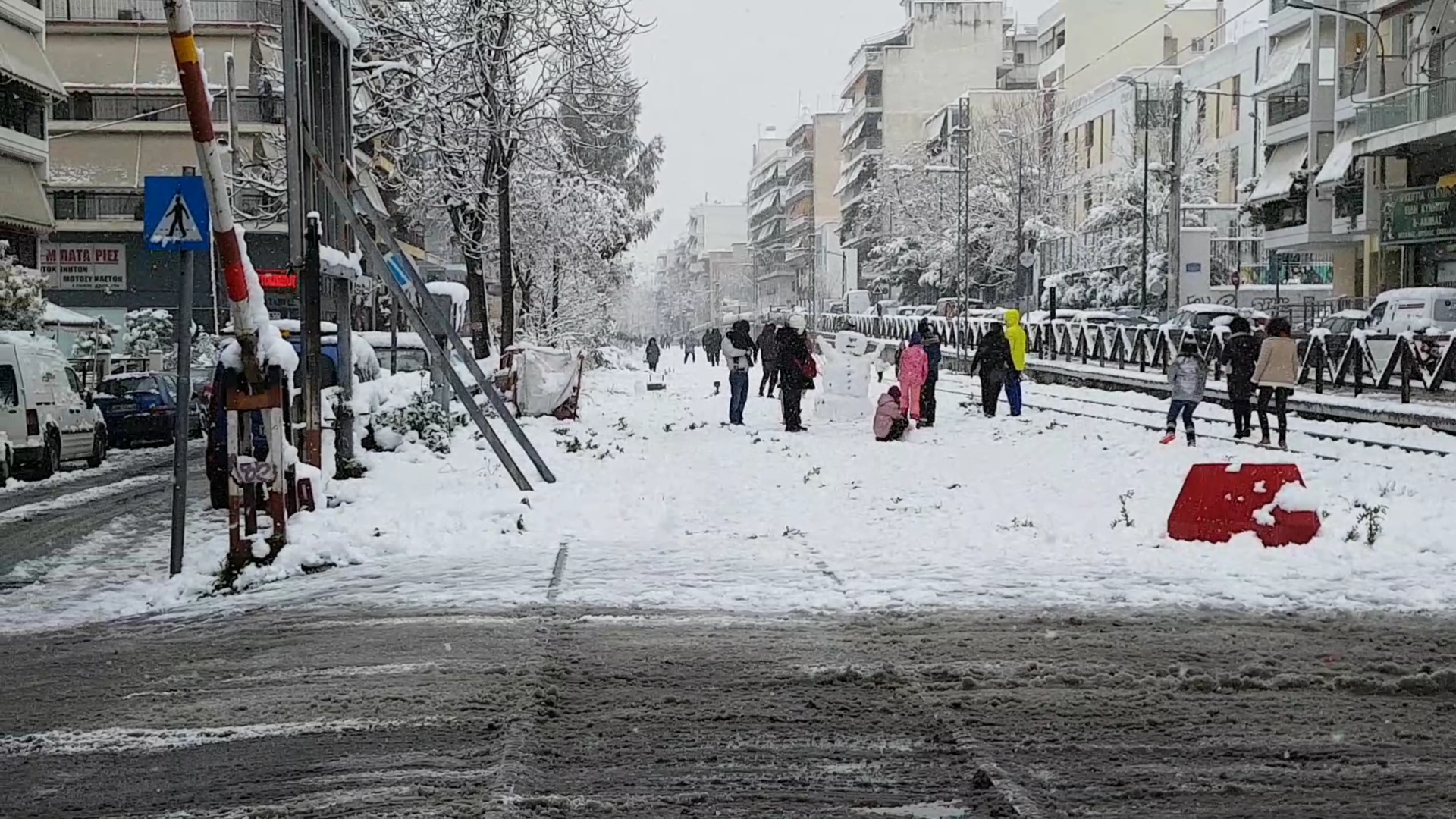
Tracks of the Athens Tram covered in snow

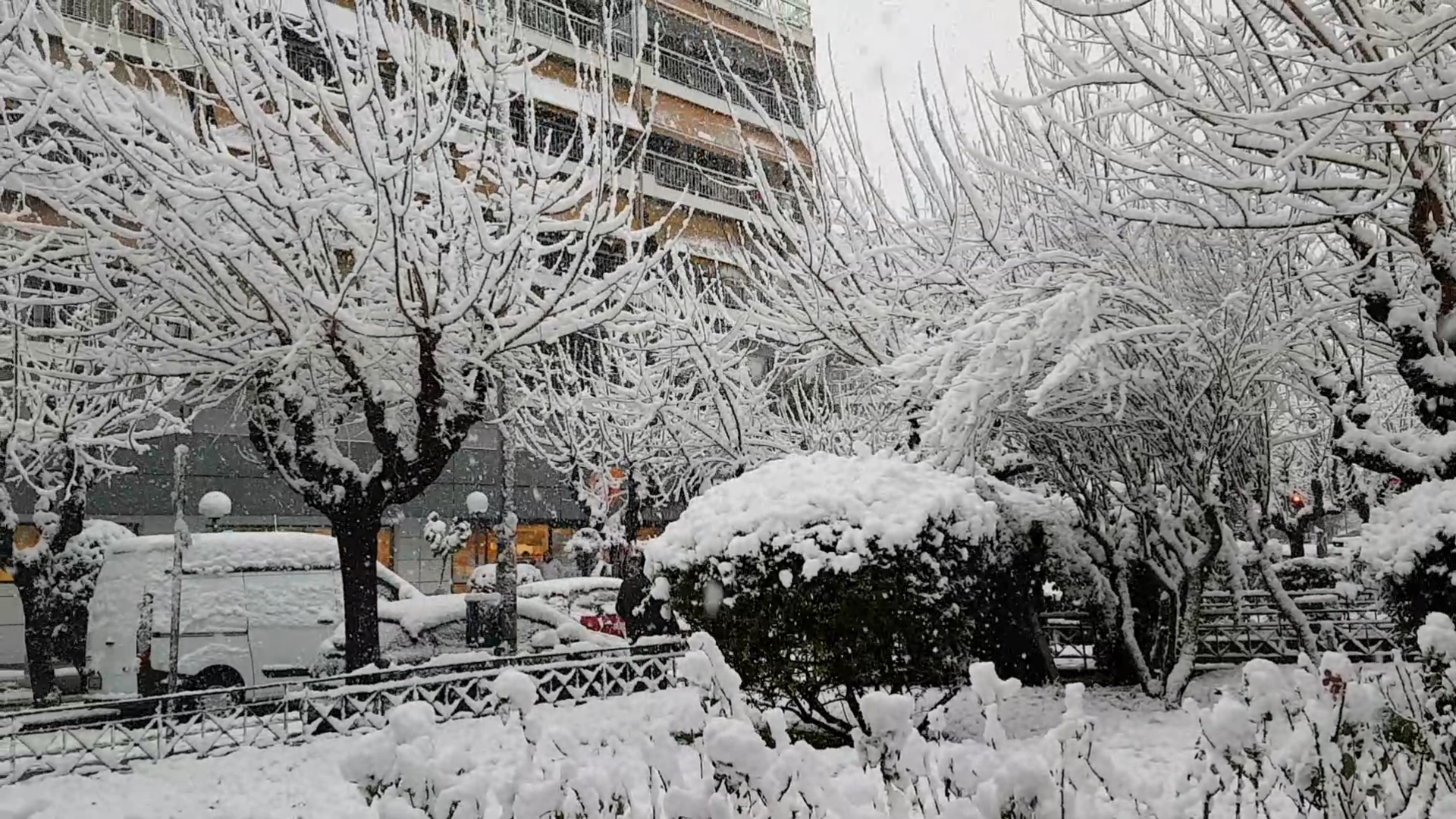
Trees in downtown Athens covered in snow

== See also ==
- Weather of 2021
