= 2021 South India floods =

2021 Indian floods

- Part of the 2021 North Indian Ocean cyclone season
- Date: 6 – 12 November 2021 (4 years, 10 months, 2 weeks and 6 days)
- Location: India (Tamil Nadu, Andhra Pradesh) Sri Lanka
- Also known as: 2021 Tamil Nadu floods, India-Sri Lanka floods, Chennai floods
- Type: Flood
- Cause: Depression BOB 05 and a low pressure system associated with the Northeast monsoon
- Deaths: 41 total (16 in India; 25 in Sri Lanka)
- Property damage: Unknown

The 2021 South India floods are a series of floods associated with Depression BOB 05 and a low pressure system that caused widespread disruption across the Indian states of Tamil Nadu, Andhra Pradesh, and the nearby Sri Lanka. The rainfall started on 1 November in Tamil Nadu. The flooding was caused by extremely heavy downpours from BOB 05, killing at least 41 people across India and Sri Lanka.

== Weather systems ==
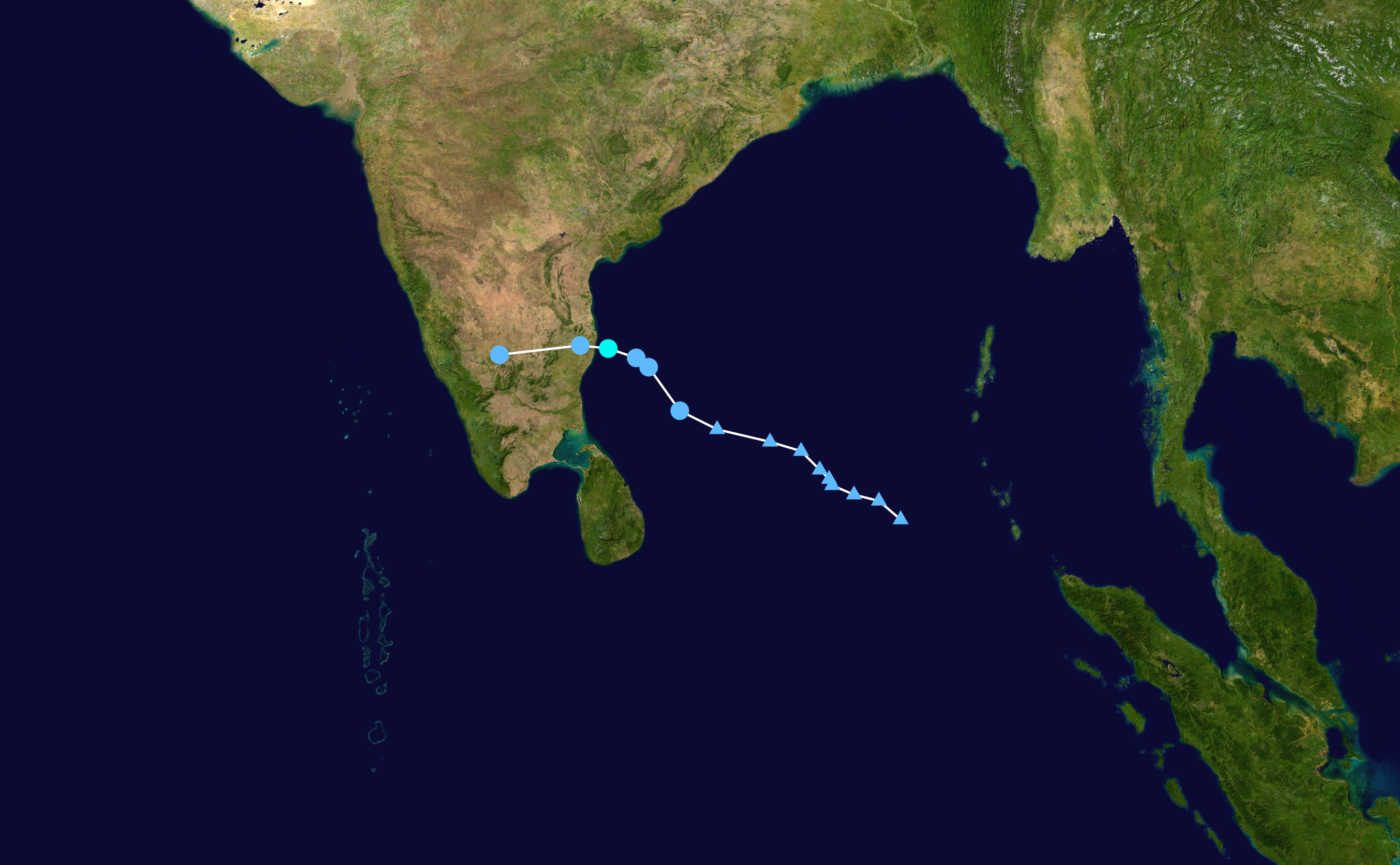
Map plotting the storm's track and intensity, according to the Saffir–Simpson scale Map key Saffir–Simpson scale Tropical depression (≤38 mph, ≤62 km/h) Tropical storm (39–73 mph, 63–118 km/h) Category 1 (74–95 mph, 119–153 km/h) Category 2 (96–110 mph, 154–177 km/h) Category 3 (111–129 mph, 178–208 km/h) Category 4 (130–156 mph, 209–251 km/h) Category 5 (≥157 mph, ≥252 km/h) Unknown Storm type Tropical cyclone Subtropical cyclone Extratropical cyclone, remnant low, tropical disturbance, or monsoon depression

On 6 November, the IMD noted the formation of a cyclonic circulation over southeastern Bay of Bengal near Sumatra. Two days later at 13:30 UTC (19:00 IST), the JTWC started tracking the same system as Invest 91B. On 9 November, under the influence of the cyclonic circulation, a low-pressure area formed over the same area. On the next day, it was upgraded to a well-marked low pressure area after the IMD noted the formation of a defined vortex in association with the system. At 15:00 UTC (21:30 IST), the IMD further upgraded it to a depression as its convective structure had improved significantly. By 19:30 UTC (01:00 IST), the JTWC issued a TCFA for system. At 09:00 UTC of 11 November, the JTWC declared it as a tropical cyclone and designated as 04B. According to the JTWC, this system had slightly higher wind speeds, since it peaked as a tropical storm with winds of 65 km/h (40 mph). However, the system could not further intensify, due to land interaction as well as high wind shear produced by an upper tropospheric ridge. Between 12:00 and 13:00 UTC (17:30 and 18:30 IST), the system made landfall very close to Chennai at the same intensity, and by 00:00 UTC (05:30 IST) the next day the system weakened into a well-marked low pressure area. The JTWC issued its final advisory at 15:00 UTC of 11 November as it moved further inland into Tamil Nadu.

== Effects ==
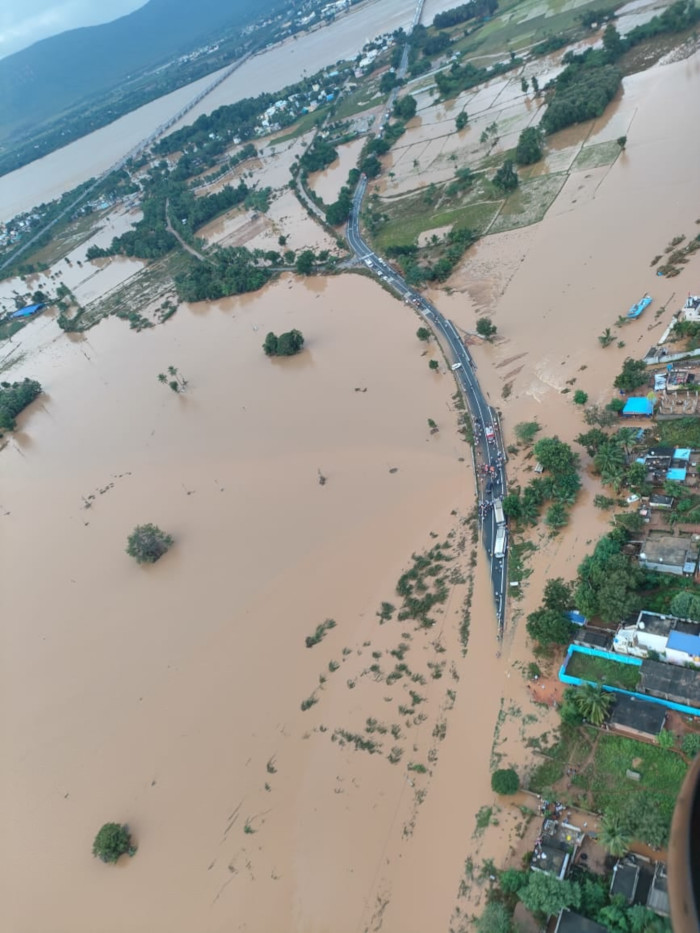
Aerial view of flooding in Tirupati district, Andhra Pradesh on 19 November.

=== India ===
Several red alerts were issued for several areas in India, including Cuddalore, Sivaganga, Ramanathapuram, Karaikal, Tiruvallur, Chennai, Kanchipuram, Chengalpattu, Viluppuram, and Tiruvannamalai for 10 to 11 November. Over 11,000 were displaced in India due to BOB 05's rainfall impact.

=== Kerala ===
Although the cyclone didn't move across towards Kerala, it has brought heavy rainfall and delayed the withdrawal of the Northeast monsoon in the northern part of the state. Orange alert was issued in the northern districts of the state from November 12 to November 16.

==== Tamil Nadu ====
The state had its first bout of severe rainfall on 6 November, which the IMD attributed to a cyclonic circulation in the Bay of Bengal. This system would eventually strengthen into BOB 05. A meteorological station at the time recorded the maximum quantity of rain for the day, 23 centimetres (230 mm; 9.1 in). Rainfall totaled 21 centimetres (210 mm; 8.3 in) at both Nungambakkam and Ambattur. On 8 November, the former would reach its maximum total amount of 21.5 centimetres (215 mm; 8.5 in).Due to the floods, which were extended from 8–9 November, the state issued a school holiday. By 7 November, three people had died as a result of the disaster, and two more had gone missing. Flooding also caused traffic disruptions over Chennai, and flood warnings were issued for Vellore as the Mordhana river overflowed. Due to the continuing rains, a major reservoir in the state was also expected to reach its maximum capacity. On that day, 650 families in a residential area were also rescued. Meanwhile, relief and cleanup efforts for the state's displaced citizens have begun.

Depression BOB 05 making Landfall in Tamil Nadu

By 9 November, five people had died. Residents in north Chennai had to deal with knee-deep flooding, and some had already resorted to swimming pools and other available options to avoid getting wet. Central Chennai was the hardest hit in the city, as two canals and one river overflowed in the area, causing major flooding. Many people there lost their homes, and snakes were said to have been present in their homes. Flood warnings were in effect in the impacted areas, as residents expressed concern about cows wading through floodwaters throughout the storm. In addition, due to the continuing rain, Chennai has been placed on red alert. Reservoirs continued to pour water, and the Tamil Nadu Revenue and Disaster Management Minister announced that 538 huts and four houses had been damaged. School activities have also been canceled by the state administration until 9 November.

Due to the ongoing rain, seven more people have been added to the death toll, bringing the total to 12 on 10 November. In the Tiruchirappalli district, almost 200 acres (81 ha) 200 acres (81 hectares) of rice fields were damaged and swamped by floodwaters, while road closures and traffic detours remained in Chennai. In addition to the metropolis, the IMD has issued a red alert for Viluppuram and Cuddalore, as heavy rain is expected to persist. A toddler was killed by a wall collapse in Thanjavur district, while an elderly woman perished from electrocution in Tiruchirapalli. As a result, the state's death toll has risen to 14. Flights across Chennai were also suspended or diverted to other airports.

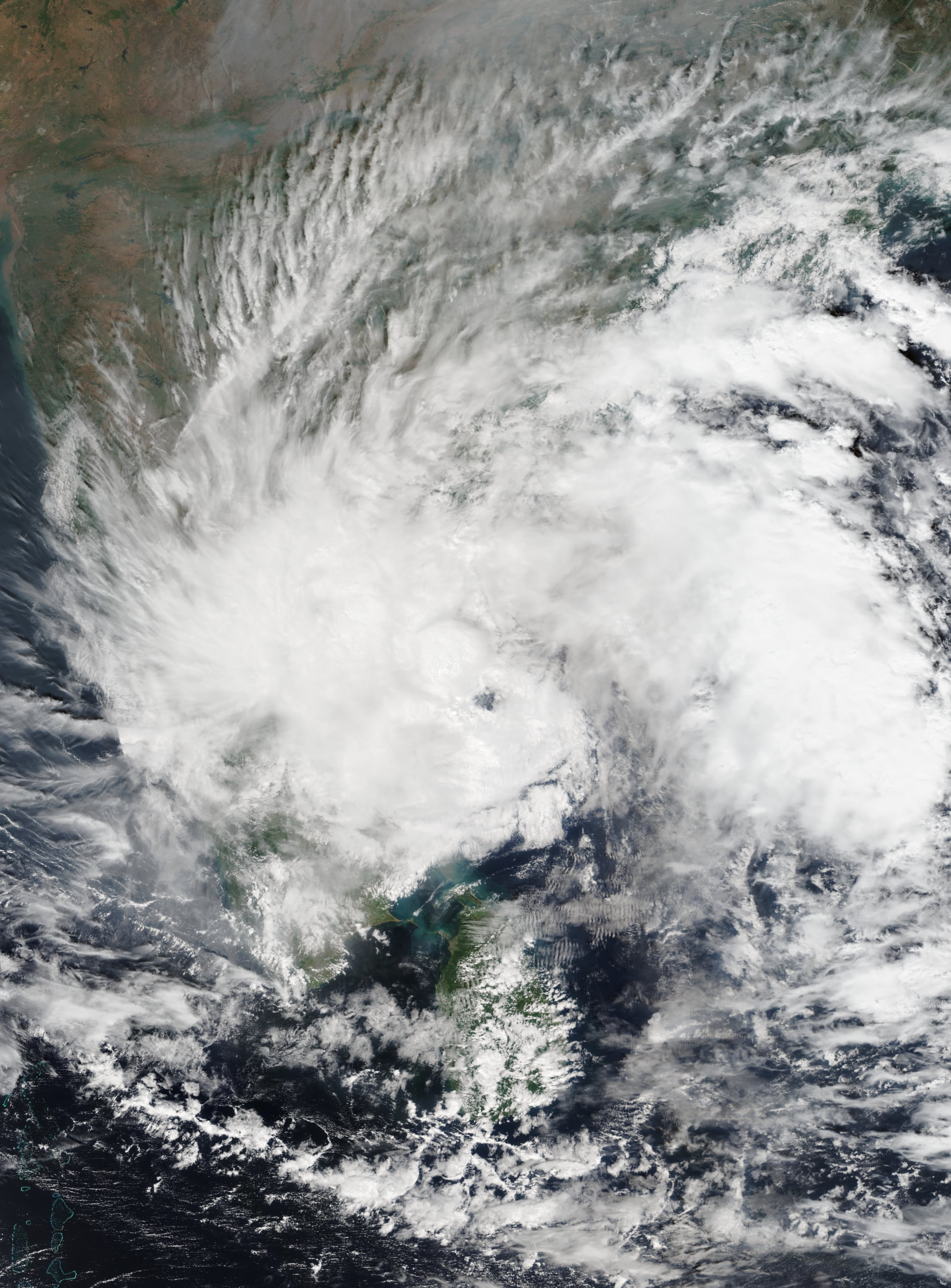
Depression BOB 05 at its peak intensity on 11 November 2021.

On 11 November, the human death toll from the event remained at 16, with 157 cattle fatalities. The state police also rescued and considered dead an unconscious guy; nevertheless, he survived when he was taken to the hospital. In Chennai, around 444 residential areas were also flooded. Flood warnings were issued for the affected areas, particularly for those who live near the Arani River. BOB 05 dumped the most rain in the state, with 23 centimetres (230 mm; 9.1 in) falling in Tambaram and Chengalpattu on that day. The National Disaster Response Force teams also came in the former and Cuddalore to stabilize and aid the area's administrations for probable assistance, while southern Chennai lost power due to heavy rains on that day. As a precaution, railway services were suspended, and operations at the Madras High Court were restricted to skeletal forces. Reservoirs across the state are also seeing an uptick in water levels. In Tamil Nadu, relief operations were also deployed, and the state government formed a committee to examine the amount of crop damage as a result of the rains.

Areas in the state capital, Chennai, were waterlogged and government officials had to use pumps to drain communities who were stranded in waist-deep waters. The storm brought the highest single day rainfall total since 2015, when it received over 49.4 centimeters (494 mm; 19.4 in) on 1 December. On 11 November 2021, Chennai received 21 centimeters (210 mm; 8.2 in) of rain.

==== Andhra Pradesh ====
Authorities in Andhra Pradesh had to rescue stranded inhabitants in Kosasthalaiyar due to floods caused to the depression. Due to the same cause, a village was cut off from the main highways. Control centers were also established for districts around the state that could suffer excessive rainfall as a result of the system. Rainfall totaled 18 millimetres (0.71 in) at Sullurpeta, Nellore, and 14 centimetres (140 mm; 5.5 in) in Tada. At 21.6 centimetres (216 mm; 8.5 in), Chittoor received the most from the system. Due to the inclement weather, school activities were also canceled. National Disaster Response Force teams were also assigned to Nellore and Chitoor in the event of a rescue mission. The storm was said to have caused damage to the Tada-Srikalahasti route, leaving motorists stuck. Irrigation tanks were also breached. Wind warnings were issued for ports around the country, and fishermen were urged not to travel into the impacted area of the Bay of Bengal between 11 and 12 November. Several trees were also destroyed, and there was a minor landslide.

=== Sri Lanka ===
Landslides injured five in the country, with flooding killing 25 people in the country.

== See also ==
- Weather of 2021
- Tropical cyclones in 2021
- 2017 Bangladesh landslides
- 2015 South India floods
- 2021 North Indian Ocean cyclone season
