= Storm Arwen =

November 2021 storm in Europe

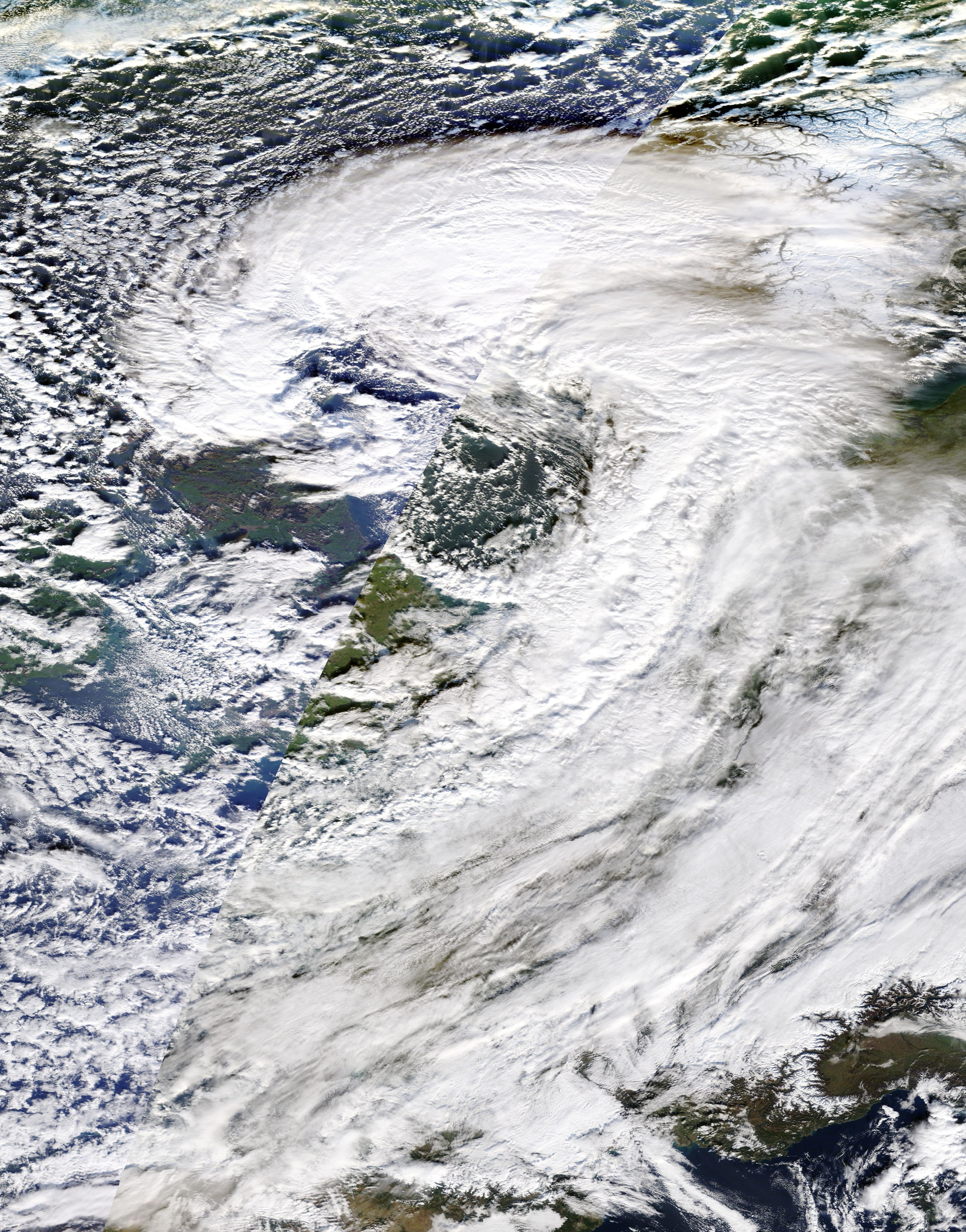
- Storm Arwen as a powerful extratropical cyclone over the North Sea.
- Area affected: UK, Ireland, France
- Date of impact: 25–27 November 2021
- Maximum wind gust: 177 km/h (110 mph; 96 kn) in Settle, North Yorkshire, England
- Fatalities: 3
- Power outages: 225,000
- Damage: Collapsed buildings and overturned lorries, loss of power in UK and France

Storm Arwen was a powerful extratropical cyclone that was part of the 2021–22 European windstorm season. It affected the United Kingdom, Ireland and France, bringing strong winds and snow. Storm Arwen caused at least three fatalities and widespread power cuts. Damage was exacerbated by the fact that the strong winds came unusually from the north.

== Meteorological history ==
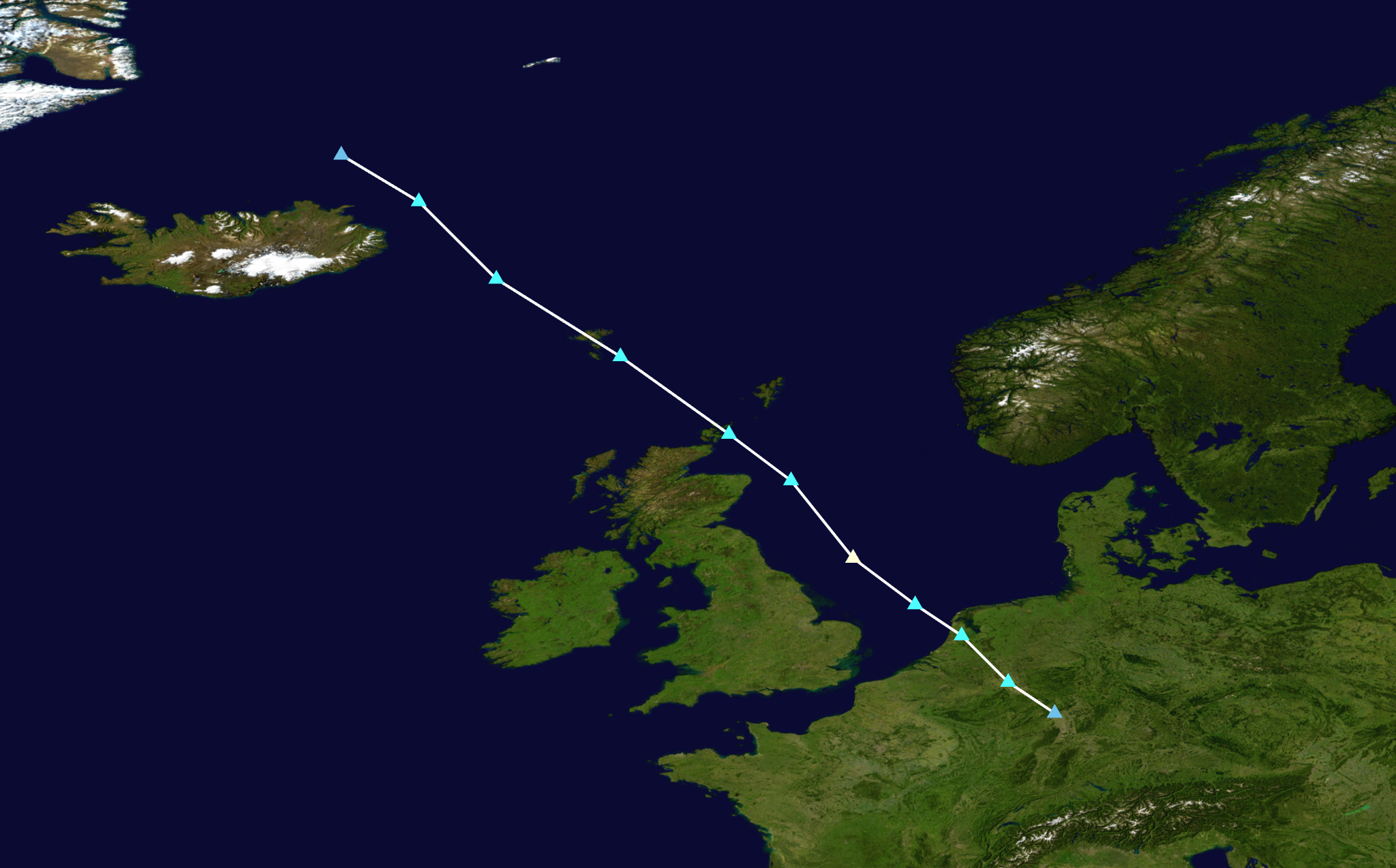
Map plotting the storm's track and intensity, according to the Saffir–Simpson scale Map key Saffir–Simpson scale Tropical depression (≤38 mph, ≤62 km/h) Tropical storm (39–73 mph, 63–118 km/h) Category 1 (74–95 mph, 119–153 km/h) Category 2 (96–110 mph, 154–177 km/h) Category 3 (111–129 mph, 178–208 km/h) Category 4 (130–156 mph, 209–251 km/h) Category 5 (≥157 mph, ≥252 km/h) Unknown Storm type Tropical cyclone Subtropical cyclone Extratropical cyclone, remnant low, tropical disturbance, or monsoon depression

Storm Arwen was named by the Met Office on 25 November 2021. Red warnings for wind were issued for north-eastern parts of the UK, as well as extensive amber and yellow warnings for much of Scotland, Northern Ireland, Wales and most of England. Dangerous waves were also forecasted causing disruption to ferry services. At 17:00 UTC on 26 November, Network Rail closed the rail lines north of Berwick-upon-Tweed and LNER stopped running trains north of Newcastle. More than 120 lorries were stuck in heavy snow on the M62 in Greater Manchester, with the motorway shut by police while ploughs and gritters led the rescue effort. The storm closed the entire Tyne and Wear Metro network which said in a statement "this is the worst winter storm to hit the Metro in 41 years of operations".

== Impacts ==
=== Ireland ===
On 26 and 27 November the north and northwestern coasts of Ireland were subjected to gale-force winds, which moved into the Irish Sea as the storm moved south-eastwards.

=== United Kingdom ===
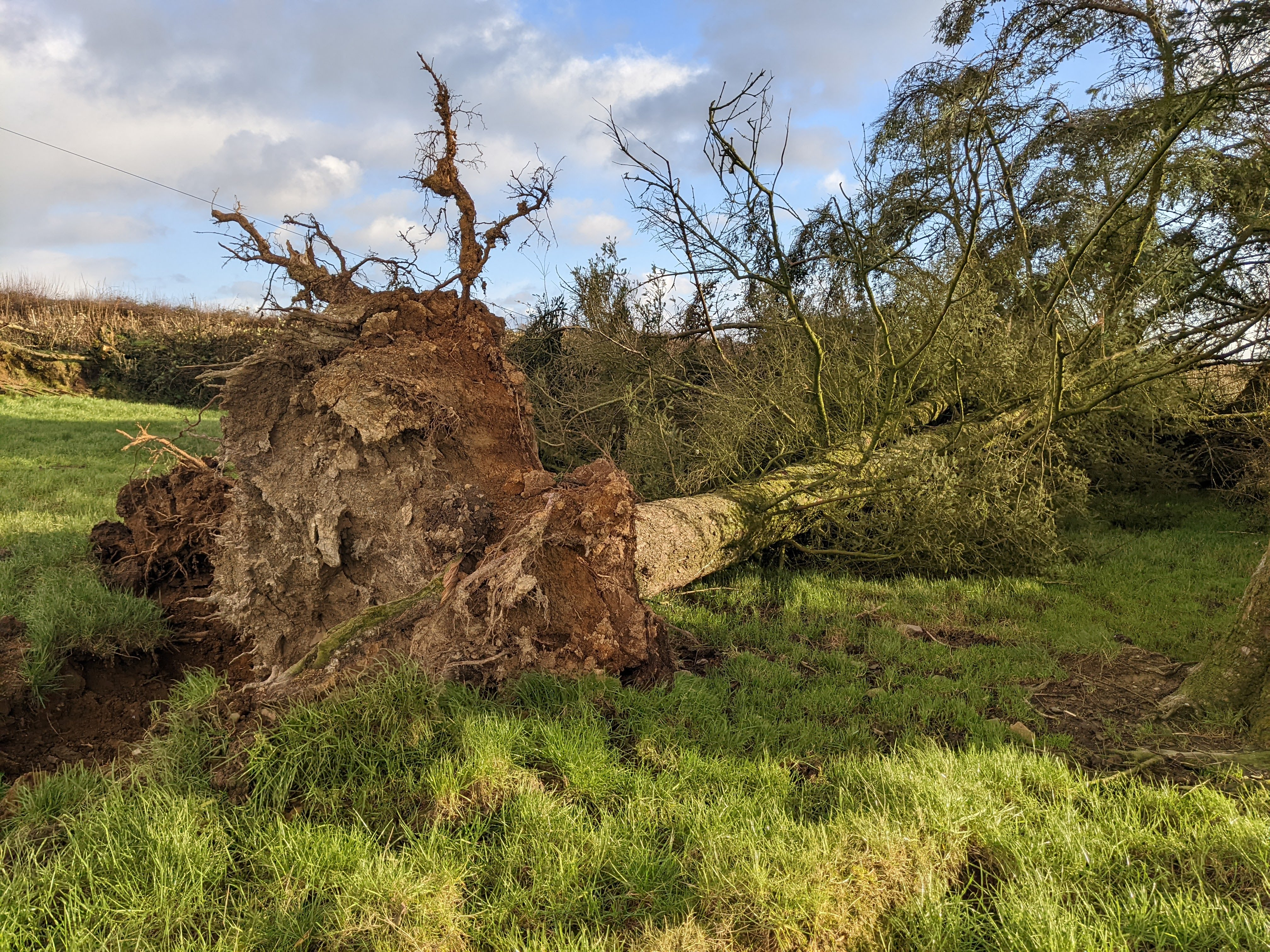
Tree blown over and uprooted on phone line

Storm Arwen was named by the Met Office on 25 November 2021. On 26 November 2021, the UK Met Office, issued what they described as a "rare red weather warning" due to a deep pressure moving southwards from the Atlantic Ocean. This forecast was of extreme wind and waves on the eastern coast of Scotland at Aberdeenshire, all the way down to the Tees Estuary in England. Red warnings for wind were issued for north-eastern parts of the UK, as well as extensive orange and yellow warnings for much of Scotland, Northern Ireland, Wales and most of England. Dangerous waves were also forecast to cause disruption to ferry services.

The damage caused by the storm was compounded by the fact that "sustained winds with gusts in excess of 90 mph were, unusually, from the north-east, affecting trees that do not normally have to yield to those winds."

112,000 homes were without power in the north of England (mostly in Northumberland, County Durham and Tyne & Wear), 80,000 were without power in Scotland (Aberdeenshire, Angus, Perthshire and the Moray Coast), and 13,000 homes in Wales lost power too. On 30 November, 45,000 UK consumers were still without power, according to the Energy Networks Association (ENA), and network operators were required to pay £44 million in compensation. Many people went without power for a week, relying on local establishments for food and other amenities. Northern Powergrid stated Arwen was the largest storm to impact their network since 2005, with large sections of overhead lines needing to be rebuilt. Many thousands of homes were still without power a week after the storm, and it was not until 7 December that power was fully restored.

It was estimated that around eight million trees in Scotland were damaged or affected by the storm. It is predicted that many forests will take decades to return to their former size.

Dozens of crashes were reported by police agencies across the UK, many roads were closed due to fallen trees, snow or ice. More than 120 lorries were stuck in heavy snow on the M62 in Greater Manchester, with the motorway shut by police while ploughs and gritters led the rescue effort. At 5pm GMT on 26 November, Network Rail closed the rail lines north of Berwick-upon-Tweed and LNER stopped running trains north of Newcastle.

A man in the Northern Irish town of Antrim died when a falling tree hit his car. Another man was hit and killed by a falling tree in Cumbria, and a third man died after his pick-up truck was struck by a falling tree in Aberdeenshire.

The live broadcasts and filming of I'm a Celebrity...Get Me Out of Here! on 26, 27, 28 and 29 November at Gwrych Castle in North Wales were affected as a result of the storm. Wind speeds reached up to 100 miles per hour (160 km/h) which caused waves in Scotland of over 10 metres (33 ft) in height.

Beamish Museum in County Durham was closed due to debris.

=== Elsewhere ===
The storm was expected to move elsewhere in Northern Europe from 28 November onwards.

== Highest wind gust per country ==
Country	Gust	Location
United Kingdom	177 km/h	Settle
Ireland	165 km/h	Hook Lighthouse
France	132 km/h	Saint-Pierre-Église
Belgium	102 km/h	Westende

== See also ==
- 2021–22 European windstorm season
- Weather of 2021
- Storm Aurore, another extratropical cyclone that affected similar areas one month earlier
- Storm Barra, another extratropical cyclone that affected similar areas ten days later
