= Weather of 2021 =

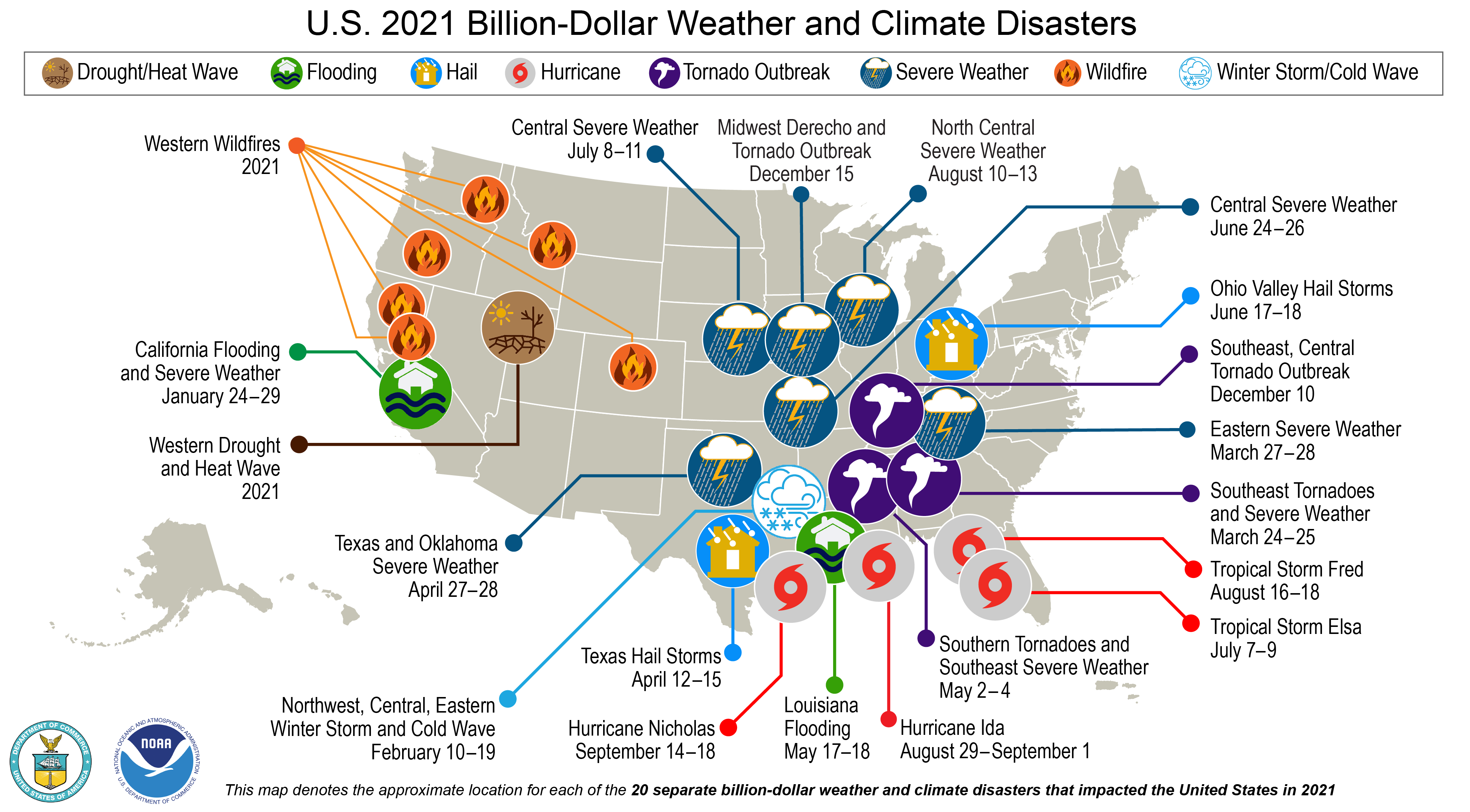
The 20 weather/climate disaster events with losses exceeding $1 billion in 2021

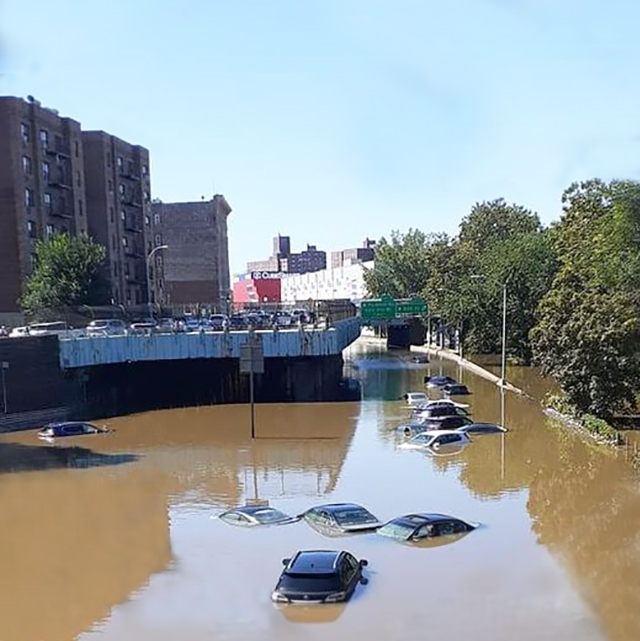
Flooding in New York City caused by Hurricane Ida

The following is a list of weather events that occurred in 2021. The year began with La Niña conditions. There were several natural disasters around the world from various types of weather, including blizzards, cold waves, droughts, heat waves, tornadoes, and tropical cyclones. In December, powerful Typhoon Rai moved through the southern Philippines, killing 410 people and becoming the deadliest single weather event of the year. The costliest event of the year, and the costliest natural disaster on record in the United States, was from a North American cold wave in February 2021, which caused $196.4 billion (USD) in damage; the freezing temperatures and widespread power outages in Texas killed hundreds of people. Another significant natural disaster was Hurricane Ida, which struck southeastern Louisiana and later flooded the Northeastern United States, resulting in $70 billion (USD) in damage. December saw two record-breaking tornado outbreaks, only four days apart from each other. In Europe, the European Severe Storms Laboratory documented 1,482 weather-related injuries and 568 weather-related fatalities. The National Oceanic and Atmospheric Administration documented 796 weather-related fatalities and at least 1,327 weather-related injuries in the United States and the territories of the United States.

== Global conditions ==
The year began with La Niña conditions that developed the previous year. This was reflected in cooler than normal sea surface temperatures in the south Pacific Ocean. However, conditions were unlike typical La Niña events, with above normal temperatures in the United States in January, but colder than normal temperatures in February. By March and April, the La Niña conditions had begun to weaken. On May 13, the National Oceanic and Atmospheric Administration (NOAA) assessed that the El Niño–Southern Oscillation (ENSO) transitioned into its neutral phase. However, following cooler than normal temperatures in the tropical eastern Pacific Ocean, NOAA declared that the global weather conditions shifted back to La Niña by October.

== Weather summaries by type ==
=== Cold waves and winter storms ===
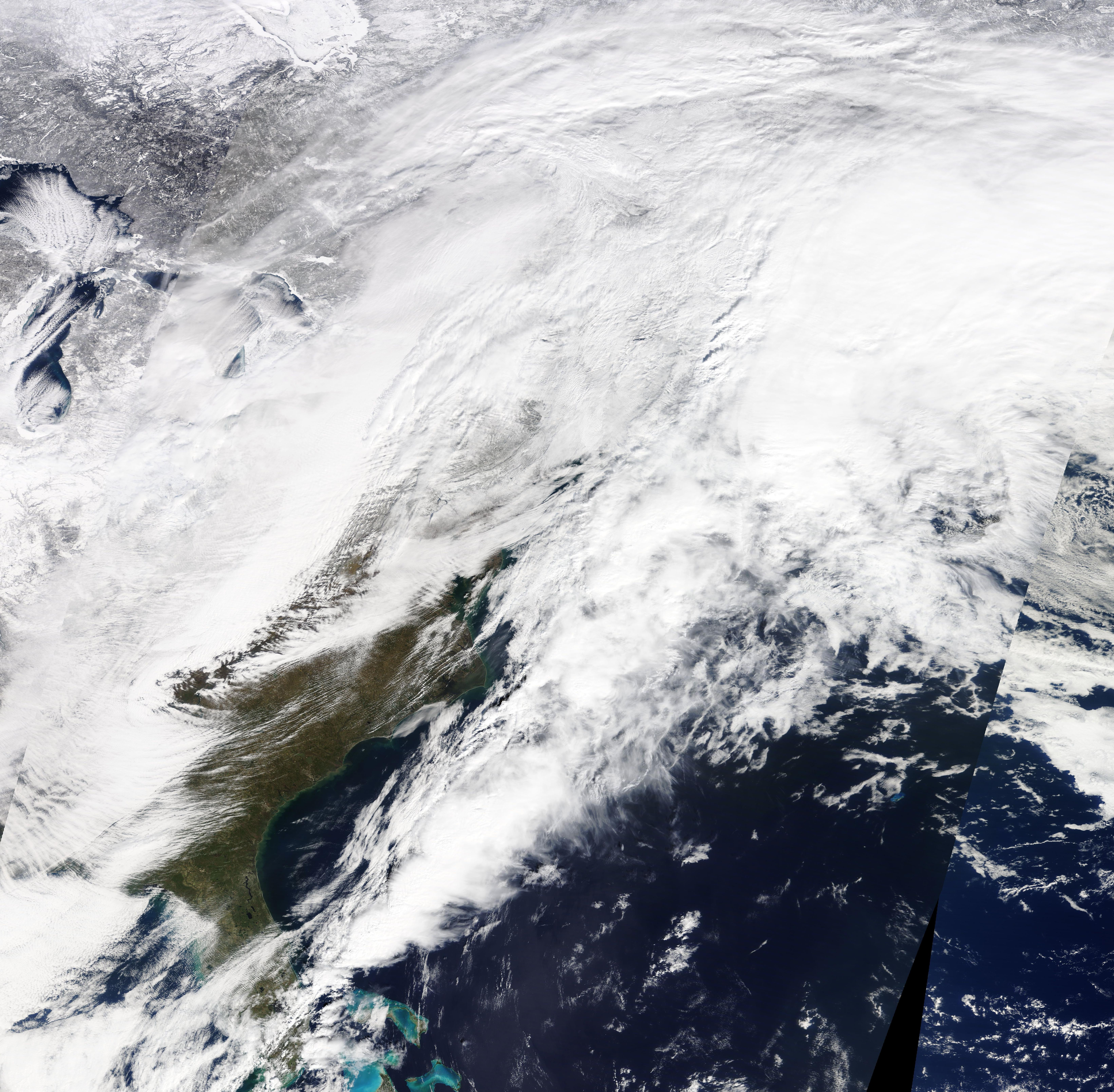
The February 13-17, 2021 North American winter storm on February 16.

In January, at least 70 people in Japan died while removing snow, related to a blizzard that dropped 2.49 m (8.2 ft) of snowfall. At least 1,500 people were stranded on a highway.

In February, extreme cold affected much of North America. During much of the winter, a high pressure system existed over southeastern Canada and Greenland, while lower than normal pressure existed over northeastern Asia into Alaska. A winter storm left more than 9 million people without power from northern Mexico to the northeastern United States; nearly half of the power outages were in Texas. There were 172 deaths in the United States, The system is estimated to have cost over $196.5 billion (2021 USD) in damages, including at least $195 billion in the United States and over $1.5 billion in Mexico, making it the costliest winter storm on record, as well as the costliest natural disaster recorded in the United States. It is also the deadliest winter storm in North America since the 1993 Storm of the Century, which killed 318 people. Another winter storm added on to the effects, leading to 29 deaths and $2 billion in damage, and caused 4 million power outages.

At the same time, a cold wave impacted Greece. This cold wave resulted in 3 deaths, and resulted in Greece getting their heaviest snowfall since 2008. Temperatures dropped as low as −19.9 °C (−3.8 °F).

In March, a record-breaking blizzard affected the Rocky Mountains. Although no one died, the system caused $75 million in damage. Cheyenne, Wyoming saw their largest two-day snowfall on record. It also became Denver's fourth largest blizzard. The storm caused car crashes which resulted in 22 injuries.

=== Droughts ===
A drought in western North America began in 2020 and continued into 2021. A 20-month period from January 2020 to August 2021 recorded the least rainfall since 1895. Lake Powell hit record low levels in July 2021, and due to Lake Mead dropping so low, water restrictions were imposed. By mid-August 2021, Iowa was facing extreme drought. Drought also affected over 85% of Mexico.

=== Floods ===
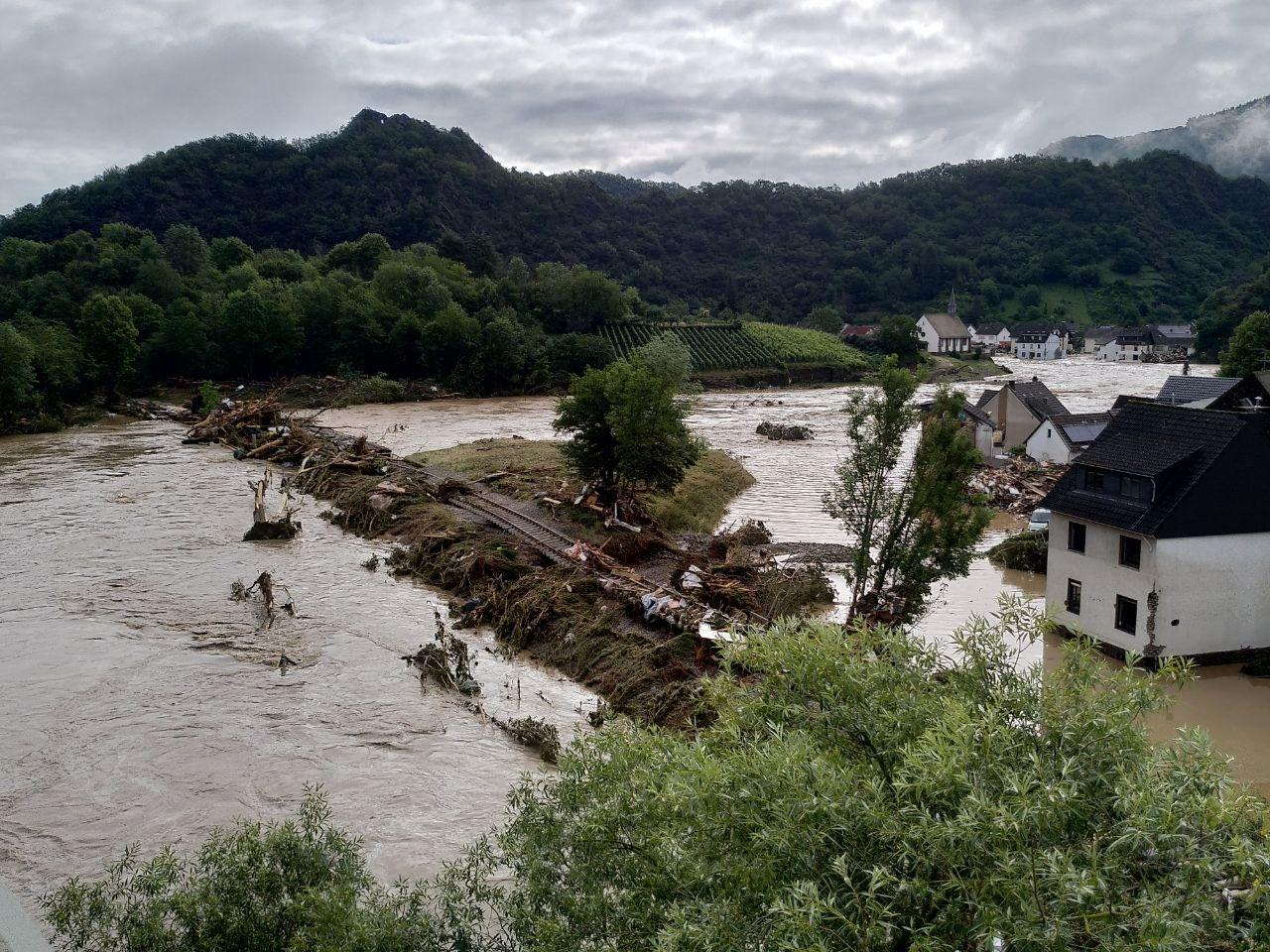
Flood damage in Altenahr, Germany

In March, a multi-day rain event caused significant flooding for many parts of Eastern and Central Australia from the March 17–21, being called a 1 in 100-year event. Comboyne, New South Wales reported a four-day total of 853 mm (33.6 in) Significant flooding occurred along the Mid North Coast and Central Australia. The Manning River at Taree equalled its 1929 record, Wingham, New South Wales saw its highest levels since 1978, The Gwydir River was 0.2m short of its 1955 record and the Mehi River in Moree, New South Wales was 0.4m below its 1955 peak. One man died due to his car losing control in Mona Vale, New South Wales, a bodyboarder who disappeared on the Coffs Harbour seashore is presumed dead. 2 more fatalities confirmed on the 24th and a woman went missing on the 26th and later discovered. In addition, floods in Hawaii left a person missing, caused $49 million in damage, and caused 1,300 power outages. Haiku recorded 7.5 inches (19 cm) of rain, and parts of the state receive 16 inches (41 cm). David Ige declared a state of emergency due to the floods.

In July, a storm system stalled over Germany, producing torrential rainfall and flash flooding. With at least 184 deaths, the floods are the deadliest natural disaster in Germany since the North Sea flood of 1962. There were also 42 deaths in Belgium. Then, floods in Henan result in at least 302 deaths. Most of the deaths and damage were in Zhengzhou. At the end of the month, floods in Afghanistan cause 113 deaths.

On August 21, severe flash flooding impacted Middle Tennessee. The state set a 24-hour precipitation record of 20.73 inches (52.7 cm), and resulted in 20 deaths. The death toll was initially 22, but was lowered when more accurate counts were published. The flooding also affected Kentucky but to a much lesser extent.

On September 1 and 2, major flash flooding affected the Northeastern United States due to the remnants of Hurricane Ida. This causes 55 deaths and around $20 billion in damage. Before the storm, the Weather Prediction Center issued a high risk for flash flooding. This became New York's 9th wettest tropical cyclone on record. New York City got its first flash flood emergency. Between 8:51 p.m. and 9:51 p.m. on September 1, New York City saw 3.15 inches (8.0 cm) of rain, its wettest hour on record.

The 2021 Pacific Northwest floods comprise a series of floods that affected British Columbia, Canada, and parts of neighboring Washington state in the United States in November and December. The flooding and numerous mass wasting events were caused by a Pineapple Express, a type of atmospheric river, which brought heavy rain to parts of southern British Columbia and northwestern United States. The natural disaster prompted a state of emergency for the province of British Columbia. Damage was at least $2.5 billion. That same month, floods in South Asia caused 41 fatalities. In addition, over 11,000 people were displaced. Over 11,000 were displaced in India due to BOB 05's rainfall impact.

At the end of the year into 2022, Malaysia experienced intense floods. 54 people died causing over $4.77 billion in damage. This was fueled by Tropical Depression 29W. Comparisons were drawn to the floods seven years prior. This was declared a once in 100 year event. This became the deadliest tropical cyclone in Malaysia since Tropical Storm Greg of 1996.

=== Heat waves ===
A winter heat wave in February across Eurasia. Sweden saw its highest ever February temperature at 16.8 °C (62.2 °F). Beijing also surpassed its February heat record by over five degrees when it hit 25.6 °C (78.1 °F).

An extreme heat wave affected much of Western North America from late June through mid-July 2021, resulting in the highest temperature ever measured in Canada at 49.6 °C (121.3 °F). The heat wave kills 229 Americans alone, and causes $8.9 billion in the US alone. Over 600 Canadians die, making it the deadliest weather event in the history of Canada. The heat wave breaks an all-time high temperature record in Washington and ties one in Oregon.

=== Tornadoes ===
There were 1,374 preliminary filtered reports of tornadoes in the United States in 2021, of which at least 1,278 were confirmed. Worldwide, 151 tornado-related deaths were confirmed with 104 in the United States, 28 in China, six in the Czech Republic, four in Russia, three in Italy, two in India and one each in Canada, New Zealand, Indonesia, and Turkey. The year started well below average with the lowest amount of tornado reports through the first two months in the past 16 years and remained below-average for most of the year due to inactivity during April, June, September, and November. Despite this, several intense outbreaks occurred in March, May, July, August, and October. May, for the first time ever, had no tornadoes above EF2 status. The year ended on a destructive note, however, as December was incredibly active, more than doubling the previous record, which pushed 2021 above average. Additionally, 2021 had the most tornado fatalities in the United States since 2011. Almost all of the fatalities were due to the Tornado outbreak of December 10–11, 2021. The 2021 Western Kentucky tornado becomes the longest tracked tornado in December, and the tornado outbreak becomes the deadliest in December. The December 2021 Midwest derecho and tornado outbreak brought the first December tornadoes on record to Minnesota. This made December 2021 the most active December for tornadoes on record. In addition, 2021 saw the 2nd highest confirmed number of tornadoes in both Pennsylvania and New Jersey.

=== Tropical and subtropical cyclones ===
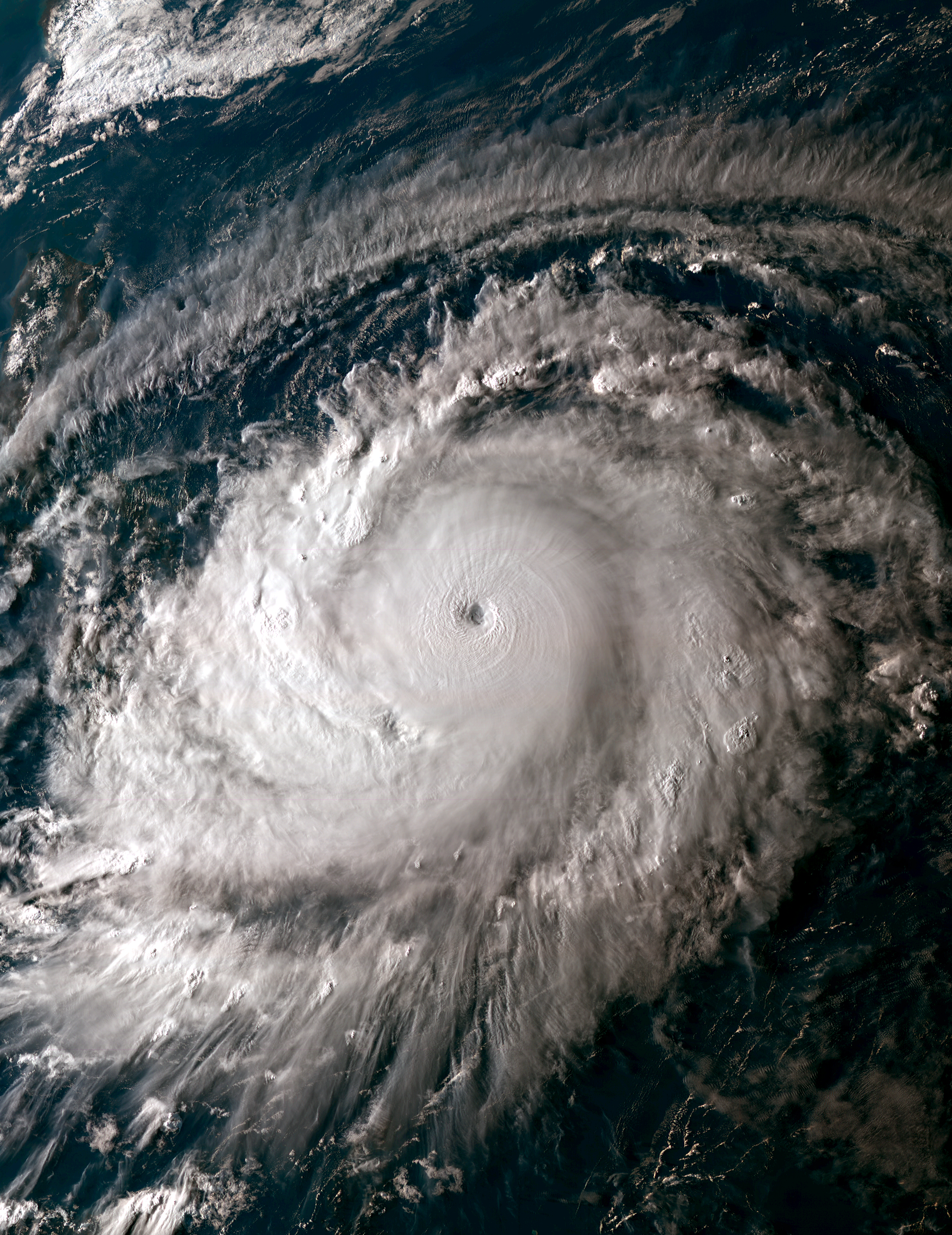
Typhoon Surigae rapidly intensifying near peak intensity east of the Philippines on April 17

In the Southern Hemisphere, there were two tropical cyclones that formed in late December and persisted into January 2021 – the remnants of Tropical Storm Chalane over southern Africa, and a tropical depression east of Madagascar that would soon become Tropical Storm Danilo. In April, Cyclone Seroja produced deadly flooding in Indonesia and East Timor, killing at least 272 people. Also in the month, Typhoon Surigae in the northwest Pacific Ocean became the strongest Northern Hemisphere tropical cyclone to form before the month of May; it attained 10-minute maximum sustained winds of 220 km/h (140 mph), according to the Japan Meteorological Agency, or one-minute sustained wind of 315 km/h (196 mph) according to the Joint Typhoon Warning Center. In May, the Eastern Pacific basin had its earliest tropical storm on record, with Tropical Storm Andres. Also in May, Cyclone Tauktae tied a cyclone in 1998 to become the strongest cyclone to strike Gujarat, with sustained winds of 160 km/h (99 mph); Tauktae killed at least 118 people in India, with another 66 deaths after Barge P305 sank near Heera oil field, off the coast of Mumbai. In August, Hurricane Ida struck the U.S. state of Louisiana with sustained winds of 150 mph (240 km/h), tying 2020's Hurricane Laura and the 1856 Last Island hurricane as the strongest on record to hit the state. Throughout the United States, damage from Ida was estimated at US$64.5 billion. In December, Typhoon Rai struck the eastern Philippines, which killed 410 people.

=== Wildfires ===
In June, the taiga forests in Siberia and the Far East region of Russia were hit by unprecedented wildfires, following record-breaking heat and drought. For the first time in recorded history, wildfire smoke reached the North Pole. In July and August, Turkey experienced its worst ever wildfire season. The fires caused 9 deaths.

Africa was also hit by wildfires. Across Algeria, wildfires killed 90 people. On April 18, a wildfire affects Table Mountain National Park and Cape Town in South Africa. The fires injured 5 firefighters.

North America was hit extremely hard by wildfires in 2021. The United States saw 5.6 million acres burn and Canada saw 10.34 million acres burn. It was predicted to be severe as early as April 2021 due to record drought. Unhealthy air from the fires spread as far as New Hampshire. One particularly severe wildfire was the Lytton wildfire. The fires caused 2 deaths, and destroyed 90% of Lytton, British Columbia. Then, in July, the Dixie Fire became the largest single wildfire in California's history. Suppression costs alone were $637 million. When the cause was determined, PG&E pled guilty to 85 felonies. Oregon also sees a massive wildfire, the Bootleg Fire. This became the third largest in state history. The wildfire is believed to have created a fire tornado. Wildfire activity persisted into December. On December 15, the December 2021 Midwest derecho and tornado outbreak caused strong, dry winds across Kansas, leading to wildfires that kill two. On December 30, the Marshall Fire became the most destructive fire in Colorado history, causing over $513 million in damage. The fire was extinguished by January 1, 2022, due to heavy snow.

== Timeline ==
This is a timeline of weather events during 2021.

=== January ===
- December 30, 2020 – January 3, 2021 – The New Year's North American winter storm kills one person and caused 119,000 power outages. The storm caused $35 million (2021 USD) in damage across the United States and Canada, per Aon.
- January 1–6 – Cyclone Imogen caused $10 million (2021 USD) in damage across Australia.
- January 7–15 – Storm Filomena killed five people and caused $2.2 billion (2021 USD) in damage across Portugal, Spain, Gibraltar, Andorra, France, Morocco, Italy, Vatican City, San Marino, Greece, Turkey, and Ukraine.
- January 14–25 – Cyclone Eloise kills 27 people with 11 missing and caused $10 million (2021 USD) in damage across Madagascar, Mozambique, Malawi, Zimbabwe, South Africa, and Eswatini.
- January 26 – An EF3 tornado hits Fultondale, Alabama, killing one person and injuring 30 others.
- January 26 – February 5 – Cyclone Ana kills one person with five missing and caused $1 million (2021 USD) in damage in Fiji.
- January 31 – February 3 – The 2021 Groundhog Day nor'easter kills 7 people, knocks out power for over 500,000 people, and caused $1.85 billion (2021 USD).

=== February ===
- February 1–7 – The 2021 Wooroloo bushfire in Australia burns 27,000 acres and 86 buildings and injured eight people.
- February 6 – Four skiers were killed and four others were injured in an avalanche in Millcreek Canyon, Utah, United States.
- February 6–22 – A cold wave, in addition to winter storms Uri and Viola, kills at least 278 people, causes power outages for millions of people across the United States, and causes $198.6 billion (2021 USD) in damage. This cold wave also led to the 2021 Texas power crisis which resulted in 210 to 702 deaths.
- February 7 – The Chamoli disaster was triggered a rock and ice avalanche. The flood resulted in 83 deaths and 121 missing.
- February 8 – Twenty-four workers died in a flooded illegally-run textile workshop in a private house in Tangier, Morocco, which occurred as a result of intense rains that hit the region. Ten others were rescued and hospitalized.
- February 10–12 – An ice storm across the United States killed 12 people and caused over $75 million (2021 USD) in damage. The first ice storm warning ever issued for Richmond, Virginia was due to this storm.
- February 11 – The Met Office reports an overnight temperature of −22.9 °C in Braemar, Aberdeenshire, the coldest weather in the UK since 1995.
- February 13 – A series of severe weather-related incidents in Northern Italy leaves four people dead and 25 others injured.
- February 13–16 – A cold wave in Greece killed three people.
- February 15 – A tornado in Brunswick County, North Carolina, associated with Winter Storm Uri, kills three people and injures ten others.
- February 16–23 – Tropical Storm Dujuan, known in the Philippines as Severe Tropical Storm Auring, kills one person with four missing and caused $3.29 million (2021 USD) in damage across Palau and the Philippines.
- February 27 – March 8 – Cyclone Niran caused 70,000 power outages and caused $200 million (2021 USD) in damage across Queensland, New Caledonia, and Vanuatu.

=== March ===
- March 4–17 – The March 2021 North American blizzard occurs, causing $75 million (2021 USD) in damage. The blizzard caused over 54,000 to lose power and several areas received some of their heaviest late-season snowfall on record.
- March 16–18 – A tornado outbreak in the Southeastern United States and Southern Plains resulted in one non-tornadic fatality and six injuries from 51 tornadoes. 25 of those 51 tornadoes occurred in Alabama, which locally refer to this outbreak as the Saint Patrick's Day tornado outbreak of 2021.
- March 24–28 – A tornado outbreak in the Southern United States resulted in 14 fatalities (7 direct tornadic, 1 indirect tornadic and 8 non-tornadic) and 37+ injuries from 43 tornadoes. The Storm Prediction Center (SPC) issued its second high-risk outlook for the month of March, as well as the second high-risk outlook for 2021 on March 25 when the bulk of activity was expected. Two tornado emergencies were issued during this outbreak by the National Weather Service.
  - March 25 – An EF3 tornado during the Tornado outbreak sequence of March 24–28 kills six people and injured ten others in Ohatchee, Alabama.
  - March 26 – An EF4 tornado during the Tornado outbreak sequence of March 24-28, 2021 in Newnan, Georgia kills one person indirectly, and causes $20.5 million in damage.

=== April ===
- April 3–12 – Cyclone Seroja kills 272 people and causing $490.7 million (2021 USD) in damage. The cyclone brought historic flooding and landslides to portions of southern Indonesia and East Timor and later went on to make landfall in Western Australia's Mid West region, becoming the first to do so since 1999.
- April 9–11 – An EF3 tornado in Louisiana kills one during a tornado outbreak. The system also caused two deaths due to straight-line winds in Louisiana and Florida.
- April 12 – May 2 – Typhoon Surigae, known in the Philippines as Typhoon Bising, kills ten people with eight missing, and caused about $10.74 million (2021 USD) in damage across the Caroline Islands, Palau, Sulawesi, the Philippines, Taiwan, Ryukyu Islands, Kuril Islands, Russian Far East, and Alaska. 63 cities experienced power interruptions; however, power was restored in 54 of those cities. Typhoon Surigae became a category 5 super typhoon and became the strongest pre-May typhoon on record.
- April 15 - Severe Nor'wester locally named kalboishakhi - severe thunderstorm, rain, and high wind affecting Bangladesh, particularly Rajshahi, Rangpur, and Dhaka with devastating effect and loss of life.
- April 18 – The Cape Town fire occurs destroying Mostert's Mill in Cape Town, South Africa, after a fire spreads from Table Mountain.
- April 21 - Whiteout conditions along Interstate 41 result in one person being killed in an 80-vehicle crash.

=== May ===
- May 2–4 – A tornado outbreak occurs in the Southeastern United States and the Great Plains, resulting in 97 tornadoes that caused $1.3 billion (2021 USD) in damage, and ten injuries. There are also four non-tornadic fatalities.
- May 9 – A landslide at a clandestine gold mine in Siguiri, Guinea, kills at least fifteen miners.
- May 14–19 – Cyclone Tauktae kills 174 people, with 81 missing, and caused $2.12 billion (2021 USD) in damage in India, Sri Lanka, Maldives, and Pakistan.
- May 16 - Floods in Texas and Louisiana kill 5 people.
- May 20 – July 23 – The Johnson Fire, in New Mexico, burned 88,918 acres.
- May 22 – The Gansu ultramarathon disaster occurs with 21 people dying from hypothermia when high winds and freezing rain strike a long-distance race in Jingtai, Gansu, China.
- May 23–28 – Cyclone Yaas kills 20 people and caused $2.84 billion (2021 USD) in damage across Bangladesh, India (Andaman and Nicobar Islands, Bihar, Jharkhand, Madhya Pradesh, Odisha, Uttar Pradesh, West Bengal), and Nepal. The total damages in West Bengal, the most heavily impacted Indian state from Yaas, were estimated to be around ₹20 thousand crore (US$2.76 billion).
- May 29–30 – Many cities in the Northeastern United States spent Memorial Day weekend setting record low high temperatures . New York City sees highs of 51 °F (11 °C) both days, while Philadelphia has a high of 54 °F (12 °C), both becoming the coldest high for the day. Albany, New York recorded a high of 50 °F (10 °C) on May 29 and 48 °F (9 °C) on May 30, both breaking records. The storm system also dumped up to 2.47 inches (6.3 cm) just outside New York City. Nearly an inch of snow fell on Mount Snow in Vermont. Due to the rain in New York City, two games between the New York Mets and Atlanta Braves were postponed. Rain in Washington DC also forced a game between the Milwaukee Brewers and Washington Nationals to be postponed.
- May 29 – June 6 – Tropical Storm Choi-wan, known in the Philippines as Tropical Storm Dante, occurs, killing 11 with 2 missing and causes $6.39 million (2021 USD) in damage in Palau, the Philippines, Taiwan and Japan.

=== June ===
- June–October – Wildfires in Algeria kills 90 people.
- June 11–13 – Tropical Storm Koguma kills one person with two missing and caused $9.87 million (2021 USD) in damage across South China, Vietnam and Indochina.
- June 11 – Lake Mead drops to its lowest water level ever recorded due to the 2020–21 North American drought.
- June 18-19 – A storm complex resulted in one fatality due to flooding in Indiana, caused a hailstorm resulting in $1.9 billion in damage, and spawned 7 tornadoes.
- June 18–20 – Tropical Storm Dolores kills three people and caused $50 million (2021 USD) in damage in Mexico.
- June 19–23 – Tropical Storm Claudette kills 14 people and caused $375 million (2021 USD) in damage in the United States.
- June 20–21 – A tornado outbreak in Canada kills one person due to an EF2 tornado in Quebec.
- June 24 – A rare, powerful and deadly IF4 tornado passes through several villages in southeastern Czech Republic, causing catastrophic damage and results in the deaths of six people and 200 others are injured. The tornado caused 15+ billion CZK (~693.9 million USD) in damage and is the strongest tornado ever recorded on the International Fujita scale.
- June 25–30 – Hurricane Enrique kills two people and caused more than $50 million (2021 USD) in damage in Mexico.
- June 25 – July 7 – The 2021 Western North America heat wave results in 914 confirmed deaths with up to 1,408+ deaths estimated. Damage totals are $8.9 billion in the United States alone.
- June 29 – The temperature reaches 49.6 °C (121.3 °F) in Lytton, British Columbia, breaking the all-time record for hottest temperature ever recorded in Canada for the third day in a row. The temperature reached 47.6 °C (117.7 °F) in Lytton on June 28 and 46.6 °C (115.9 °F) on June 27, both records. These record high temperatures are a result of the 2021 Western North America heat wave.
- June 30 – The Lytton wildfire kills 2 people and burned 206,926 acres. The wildfire is a result of the 2021 Western North America heat wave.
- June 30 - Newark, New Jersey sets their all time hottest temperature in June, at 103 °F (39 °C).

=== July ===
- July 1–14 – Hurricane Elsa kills 13 people, and caused $1.2 billion (2021 USD) in damage in the Caribbean, the United States, and Canada.
- July 3 – The 2021 Atami landslide occurs in Atami, Shizuoka Prefecture, Japan, killing 27. The landslide was a result of heavy rainfall with the city receiving 310 millimetres (12 inches) of rainfall in a 48-hour period.
- July 3-4 - Several record low highs were set. On July 3, this included 60 °F (16 °C) in Boston, 57 °F (14 °C) in Worcester. On July 4, this included Augusta, Maine, with a high of 57 °F (14 °C). Record daily precipitation also hit the city, accumulating to 1.18 inches (3.0 cm).
- July 3–5 – A huge wildfire spreads through Limassol, Cyprus, killing four people and forcing the evacuation of several villages. It is described as the worst wildfire in the country's history.
- July 6 – August 15 – The Bootleg Fire occurs in Oregon, resulting in 413,765 acres being burned and 408 building being destroyed.
- July 10 - The all-time high temperature of the state of Utah, at 117 °F (47 °C), is tied in Saint George. Las Vegas also tied their all time high temperature, also at 117 °F (47 °C).
- July 12–25 – The 2021 European floods results in 243 deaths and caused $11.8 billion (2021 USD) in damage across Europe.
- July 12 – 65 people were killed by lightning strikes in the Indian states of Rajasthan, Uttar Pradesh and Madhya Pradesh, with a single strike killing 16 at Amer Fort near Jaipur.
- July 13 – October 25 – The Dixie Fire kills one firefighter, burns 963,309 acres and damaged over 1,300 structures. The Dixie Fire became the largest single (i.e. non-complex) wildfire in California's history and it was the first fire known to have burned across the crest of the Sierra Nevada. It caused $1.15 billion in damage.
- July 15–31 – Typhoon In-fa kills 6 people and resulted in $1 billion (2021 USD) in damage in the Philippines, Ryukyu Islands, Taiwan, China, and North Korea.
- July 17–31 – Floods in Henan, China result in the deaths of 302 people with 50 missing and causing around 82 billion yuan (US$12.7 billion) in damage.
- July 18 – Heavy floods in Mumbai, India, caused a landslide that kills 32 people and injured 5 others.
- July 22–August – Floods in Maharashtra kills 208 people with eight missing.
- July 26 – A dust storm caused a 20-vehicle pileup on Interstate 15 in the U.S. state of Utah, killing eight people and injuring several others.
- July 28–29 – A tornado outbreak across the Great Lakes, Ohio Valley, and Mid-Atlantic kills one person (non-tornadic), injured 13 others, and caused $315 million (2021 USD) in damage.
  - July 29 – A possible EF0 anticyclonic tornado touches down in Bustleton, Philadelphia, Pennsylvania during the tornado outbreak of July 28–29, 2021.
- July 28 – Floods in Islamabad, Pakistan kills two people. Started after the cloudburst in Islamabad, Pakistan, caused flood situation in many parts of the federal capital and killed two people.
- July 28 – August 1 – Floods in Afghanistan kill at least 113 people.

=== August ===
- August 4 – Seventeen people were killed in northern Bangladesh during a lightning strike on a boat celebrating a wedding.
- August 11–20 – Tropical Storm Fred kills seven people and caused $1.3 billion (2021 USD) in damage in the Caribbean, the Eastern United States, and Canada.
- August 11 – At least 10 people were killed and dozens more trapped under debris after a landslide in a Himalayan district of Himachal Pradesh, India.
- August 13–21 – Hurricane Grace kills 16 people and caused $513 million (2021 USD) in damage across the Caribbean and Mexico.
- August 15 – Heavy rain in Japan causes a landslide in Okaya, Nagano leaving 3 people dead after the landslide damaged their house.
- August 16–24 – Hurricane Henri kills two people and caused $550 million (2021 USD) in damage in Bermuda, the northeastern United States, and southern Nova Scotia.
- August 18 – Flash flooding caused by torrential rains kills at least seven people in Addis Ababa, Ethiopia.
- August 21 – Floods in Tennessee kill 20 people and cause $101.11 million in damage. A record 20.73 in (527 mm) of rain in 24 hours was reported in McEwen, Tennessee.
- August 25–30 – Hurricane Nora kills three people and caused $125 million (2021 USD) in damage in Western Mexico.
- August 25 – September 4 – Hurricane Ida kills 115 people and causes $75.25 billion (2021 USD) in damage, making this the fifth-costliest hurricane on record. The precursor to Ida killed 20 people and left 17 people missing after torrential rains caused landslides in western Venezuela. The hurricane also impacted Colombia, Jamaica, the Cayman Islands, Cuba, the United States, and Canada. In addition, from August 29 to September 2, the Hurricane Ida tornado outbreak kills one person and injures seven others from 35 tornadoes.

=== September ===
- September 2-7 - The precursor to Tropical Storm Mindy caused 23 deaths and $75 million in Mexico.
- September 7-9 - Death Valley sets two global heat records. The high of 50 °C (122 °F) in September 7 is the latest any spot on the globe saw a temperature in the 50s°C. On September 9, the low of 102 °F (39 °C) became the warmest low on record in September.
- September 7–13 – Hurricane Olaf kills one person and caused $10 million (2021 USD) in damage across Western Mexico and the Baja California Peninsula.
- September 10 – Two people were killed and nine others were injured after a powerful whirlwind hits Pantelleria, Sicily, Italy.
- September 12–18 – Hurricane Nicholas caused over 700,000 power outages, kills 4 people and caused $1 billion (2021 USD) in damage across the Yucatán Peninsula, Tamaulipas, and the Gulf Coast of the United States. A state of emergency was declared by Governor of Louisiana, John Bel Edwards, in preparation for the hurricane.

=== October ===
- The hottest October occurred in Newark, New Jersey, Washington DC, Milwaukee, Scranton, Pennsylvania, Williamsburg, Virginia, Baltimore, Harrisburg, Pennsylvania, and Syracuse, New York occurs. Toledo also has its wettest October.
- October 6 – Five people were killed by flash flooding which occurred in parts of the U.S. states of Alabama and Tennessee, with as much as 13 inches (33 cm) of rain falling in some areas.
- October 13–16 – European Windstorm Ballos kills two people and causes damage across France (Corsica), Italy, Greece, Slovenia, Croatia, Bosnia and Herzegovina, Serbia, Montenegro, North Macedonia, and Albania.
- October 19–26 – The October 2021 Northeast Pacific bomb cyclone occurs killing two people, causing a power outage to 370,500 people, and caused $400 million in damage to Russia's Far East, Japan, Alaska, the Western United States, and Western Canada. The bomb cyclone had a minimum central pressure of 942 millibars (27.8 inHg) at its peak, making it the most powerful cyclone recorded in the Northeast Pacific.
- October 20–23 – European Windstorm Aurore, kills six people, causes 525,000 power outages, and causes more than $100 million (2021 USD) in damage across the United Kingdom, France, Czech Republic, Poland, Netherlands, Germany, and Russia.
- October 24 – November 2 – Cyclone Apollo, also known as Medicane Nearchus, killed seven and caused $245 million (2021 USD) in damage across Algeria, Tunisia, Italy (especially Sicily), Malta, Libya, Cyprus, and Turkey.
- October 25–28 – The October 2021 nor'easter, which eventually became Tropical Storm Wanda, kills at least two people and causes more than $200 million (2021 USD) in damage across the United States and Canada.
- October 27 – An EF1 tornado hits Moss Point, Mississippi killing one person.

=== November ===
- November 5–18 – European Windstorm Blas kills nine people and caused damage across Algeria, the Balearic Islands, the east coast of Spain, Southern France, Morocco, Sardinia, and Sicily.
- November 6 – An extremely rare EF0 tornado hit Vancouver, British Columbia, Canada and caused significant damage to the areas surrounding the University of British Columbia.
- November 6–12 – Floods in South India caused by Depression BOB 05 kills 41 people and causes damage across India and Sri Lanka.
- November 14 – December 17 – Floods in the Pacific Northwest kill six people across Southern British Columbia, Canada, and Washington, United States and causes over $2.5 billion (2021 USD) in damage. Washington Governor Jay Inslee issued a state of emergency on November 15 covering 14 counties in Western Washington, and on November 17, a state of emergency was declared in British Columbia.
- November 17 – A tornado moved through Modica, Sicily, killing one person, injuring two others, and severely damaging several homes.
- November 21–23 – A series of floods in Atlantic Canada caused damage across that area. The floods prompted a state of emergency to be declared in Inverness and Victoria.

=== December ===
- December 2–6 – Cyclone Jawad kills two people and caused damage across India (Andhra Pradesh, Odisha, and West Bengal) and Bangladesh.
- December 5–9 – European Windstorm Barra kills three people with one missing and caused damage and caused over 59,000 power outages across Ireland and the United Kingdom.
- December 9–11 – A winter storm, unofficially named Winter Storm Atticus impacted the United States and Canada and caused over 500,000 power outages. This winter storm later created the Tornado Outbreak of December 10–11, 2021, which killed 95 people (89 tornadic and 6 non-tornadic) and injured 672 throughout the United States from 71 tornadoes. During the outbreak, the National Weather Service issued eight tornado emergencies, setting a new record for the most issued during the month of December. The outbreak prompted the Governor of Kentucky, Andy Beshear, to declare a state of emergency for portions of Western Kentucky.
  - December 10 – A violent, long tracked EF4 tornado in Western Kentucky kills at least 58 people (57 direct and 1 indirect), injures 515 others, and caused catastrophic damage to numerous towns in Kentucky, including Mayfield, Benton, Dawson Springs, and Bremen.
  - December 10 – An EF3 tornado in Illinois kills six people, injures one and caused catastrophic damage to an Amazon warehouse in Edwardsville, Illinois.
  - December 10 – A long tracked EF3 tornado causes $11.026 in damage and 34 injuries to portions of Tennessee and Kentucky along its 122.91 miles (197.80 km) path.
  - December 11 – An EF3 tornado kills 16 people directly, plus one indirect, and injures 63 others after hitting Bowling Green, Kentucky and caused Western Kentucky University to lose power.
- December 10–13 – Subtropical Storm Ubá kills 15 people and caused damage across Argentina, Brazil and Uruguay. On 10 December 2021, according to the Brazilian Navy, the system transitioned into a subtropical depression. Subtropical Storm Ubá caused 30 municipalities in Bahia, Brazil, to decree a state of emergency.
- December 10–14 – Cyclone Ruby caused over 14,800 power outages and damage across the Solomon Islands and New Caledonia.
- December 11–21 – Typhoon Rai, known in the Philippines as Typhoon Odette, kills 410 people with 80 missing, and caused $1.02 billion (2021 USD) in damage across the Caroline Islands, Palau, the Philippines, the Spratly Islands, Vietnam, South China, Hong Kong and Macau.
- December 13–18 – A historic derecho, winter storm, and windstorm across North America kills five people directly and two people indirectly through a wildfire outbreak in Kansas, caused 117 tornadoes, and caused over 600,000 power outages. This tornado outbreak set the record for the most tornadoes during a December outbreak. The initial winter storm, unofficially named Winter Storm Bankston by The Weather Channel, became a category 3 atmospheric river event, which heavy rain and snow to the west coast of the United States. The winter storm caused California's statewide snowpack to increase from 19% of normal to 83% of normal.
- December 16–22 – Winter Storm Carmel kills four people and caused damage across Greece, Cyprus, and Israel.
- December 16, 2021 – January 19, 2022 – Floods in Malaysia, locally called Banjir Shah Alam, caused by Tropical Depression 29W kills 54 people with two missing and caused over $4.77 billion (2021 USD) in damage across Malaysia.
- December 24–Present – Floods in Bahia, Brazil kills 21 people and injured over 280 others. As a result of the floods, 72 municipalities of Bahia declared a state of emergency.
- December 24, 2021 – January 6, 2022 – Tropical Cyclone Seth kills two people and caused severe flooding in southeastern Queensland.
- December 25 – The National Weather Service office in Boquillas, Texas records a temperature of 94 °F (34 °C), marking the highest temperature ever recorded in the United States on Christmas Day.
- December 28 - A temperature of 67 °F (19 °C) in Kodiak, Alaska becomes the all time warmest statewide temperature for the entire month.
- December 30, 2021 – January 1, 2022 – Grass fires in Boulder County, Colorado killed one person, left two people missing and injured six others. Wind gusts of 115 miles per hour (185 km/h) were reported and the fire destroyed 1,084 structures and caused $513 million (2022 USD) in damage.

== See also ==
- 2021 in the environment and environmental sciences
- Weather of 2020

Global weather by year
Preceded by 2020	Weather of 2021	Succeeded by 2022
