= Storm Barra =

December 2021 European windstorm in Europe

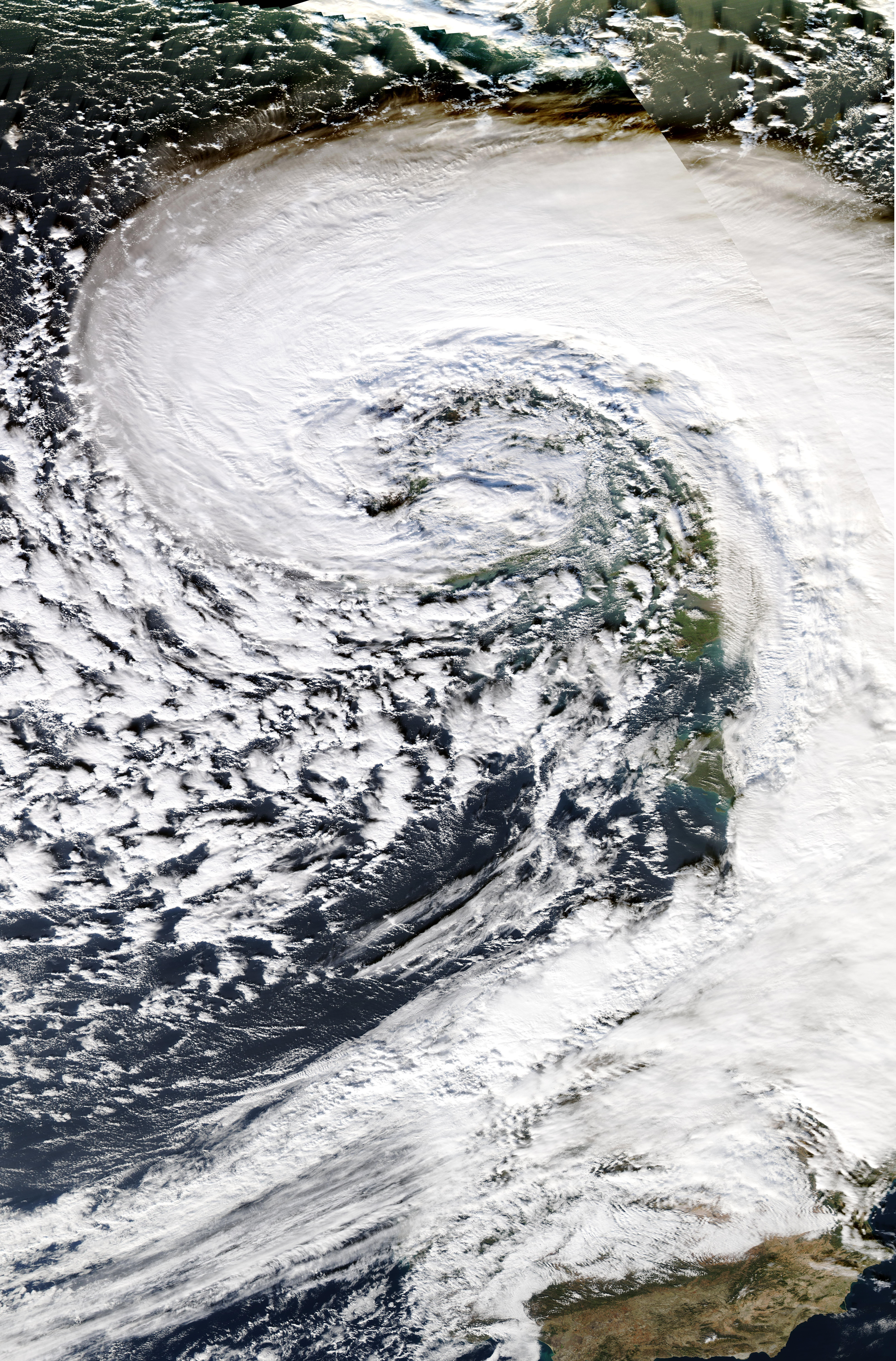
- Barra on 7 December over Ireland

Meteorological history
- Formed: 5 December 2021
- Dissipated: 9 December 2021

Extratropical cyclone
- Lowest pressure: 956 mb (956 hPa)

Overall effects
- Fatalities: 3 reported + 1 missing
- Areas affected: France, Ireland, United Kingdom, Spain
- Power outages: 59,000
- Part of 2021–22 European windstorm season

Storm Barra was a hurricane-force extratropical bomb cyclone in the North Atlantic Ocean that impacted Ireland and the United Kingdom with damaging gusts and heavy rainfall. Barra was also the reason for one of Navarre in Spain's worst floods in two decades. A surface low first developed over the Atlantic Ocean, which would eventually become Barra. This system rapidly intensified owing to approaching Ireland, bottoming from 1,010 to 956 hectopascals (29.8–28.2 inHg) in just 24 hours. It then impacted the country, before weakening and moving through the United Kingdom. As it entered the North Sea, it further degraded and was absorbed by the frontal system of "Justus", an extratropical cyclone named by the Free University of Berlin (FUB).

Barra caused widespread preparations in Ireland and the UK. Schools were canceled, and weather alerts were placed for the possible areas to be affected by the impeding cyclone. COVID-19 test drives, along with hospital operations in the former were also disrupted. The strongest wind gust reported from the storm was 115 km/h (32 m/s) in Sherkin Island. Different properties were damaged, and trees were felled in Ireland, and also in the UK, where snow impacted areas of Scotland. Over 59,000 households also lost electricity. The storm also caused devastating floods in Spain, where one was killed. Overall, one death each was confirmed in Ireland, the UK and Spain, respectively and the damages were unknown.

== Meteorological history ==
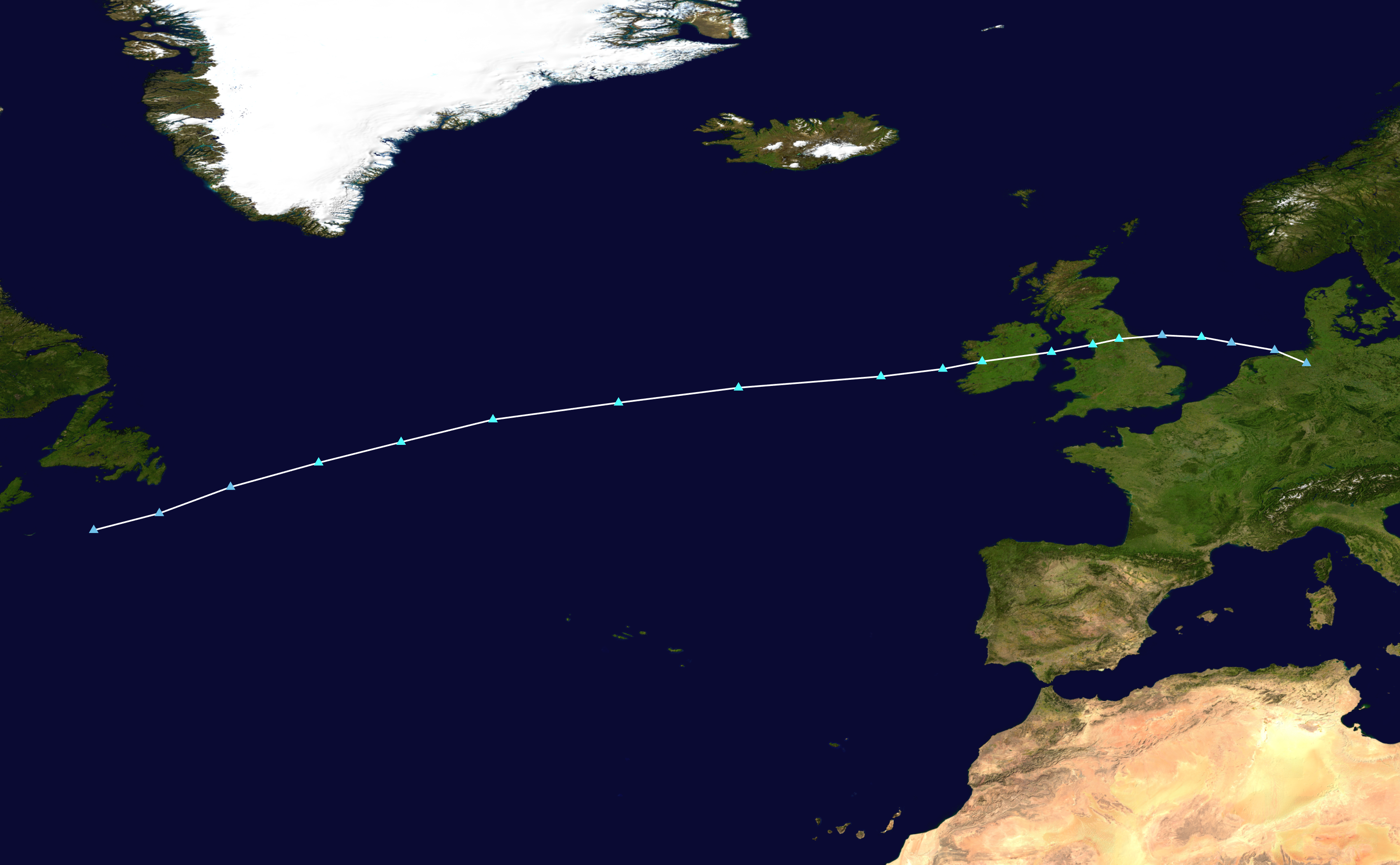
Map plotting the storm's track and intensity, according to the Saffir–Simpson scale Map key Saffir–Simpson scale Tropical depression (≤38 mph, ≤62 km/h) Tropical storm (39–73 mph, 63–118 km/h) Category 1 (74–95 mph, 119–153 km/h) Category 2 (96–110 mph, 154–177 km/h) Category 3 (111–129 mph, 178–208 km/h) Category 4 (130–156 mph, 209–251 km/h) Category 5 (≥157 mph, ≥252 km/h) Unknown Storm type Tropical cyclone Subtropical cyclone Extratropical cyclone, remnant low, tropical disturbance, or monsoon depression

An extratropical cyclone near Greenland contributed to the predecessor of Barra. On 5 December 2021, a circulation formed over the northern Atlantic Ocean, from a surface low. The Free University of Berlin (FUB) named it "Harry" with a pressure of 1,010 hectopascals (30 inHg). On the same day, Met Éireann named this developing system "Barra", as it was forecasted to bring strong gusts to Ireland. The storm began to move northwestwards, and started to rapidly intensify whilst nearing Ireland, with its pressure falling to 965 hPa (28.5 inHg) according to a weather map by the FUB on 6 December. However, a 12:00 UTC weather map by the Met Office, the weather agency of the United Kingdom, indicated a much lower pressure of 957 hPa (28.3 inHg). The United States Ocean Prediction Center analysed an even lower pressure of 956 hPa (28.2 inHg) on the system. Nevertheless, the storm moved over the Irish Sea and again over mainland United Kingdom. At one occasion, Barra's eye moved over Ulster. On 8 December, Barra rapidly weakened as it entered the North Sea before merging with the frontal system of an extratropical cyclone, in which the FUB named as "Justus".

In regards to the storm's naming, the name "Barra" was confirmed to be from the BBC Northern Ireland weatherman Barra Best.

== Preparations and impacts ==
Barra is seen to impact Ireland and the United Kingdom, after Storm Arwen caused widespread power disruptions to the said countries. The storm is also forecasted to be "less severe" than the previous Arwen.

=== Ireland ===
All schools, colleges, universities and childcare facilities, COVID-19 vaccination and testing centres, and bus operations in red or orange weather alert areas were suspended in parts of the country, along with Met Éireann issuing red warnings to counties Cork, Clare and Kerry. Orange and yellow warnings were also placed for other counties in the country. Winds up to 140 km/h (39 m/s) were forecasted to impact the area, with authorities there warning people across Ireland to stay in their homes for their own safety. Storm surge from the cyclone, along with snow and hail were also foreseen to slash the country. Marine warnings were also posted to warn fishermen not to venture along the rough waters, along with flood levees being built in Mallow and Fermoy. The HSE suspended hospital and other essential services, and traffic was disrupted. Several flight operations from Aer Lingus were also cancelled and many night events were postponed. National parks and court hearings across the country were also shut down. Coastal flooding were also feared, due to tides. The weather agency of Ireland called Barra a "significant and severe weather event" as the country brunts the storm's impacts.

As Barra made landfall by 7 December, a wind gust of 115 km/h (32 m/s) was registered at Sherkin Island, according to Met Éireann. Roches Point recorded a gust of 104 km/h (29 m/s) in the same period. Mace Head, meanwhile reported a pressure of 965 hPa (28.5 inHg). The Fastnet Lighthouse revealed a wind gust of 87 kn (45 m/s) by 09:56 UTC and 11:32 UTC. As anticipated, high tides caused flooding over Cork, along with trees being fallen. The River Lee overflowed due to the storm, flooding areas near the basin. Areas over Cork and Kerry had power outages, and 59,000 homes and businesses in Ireland were reportedly without power on 7 December. The National Emergency Coordination Group were briefed that the worst impacts were still to come. Concern was raised at the meeting that some people in Cork and Kerry were not heeding warning to stay indoors. A two-vehicle incident due to bad weather induced by Barra killed a person and injured two more on 7 December in the afternoon. Many public and private property also suffered damages, mainly due to them being crushed by a falling tree. The M8 Dublin–Cork motorway also reported damages, with being described as "significant". Fishing vessels were also battered by Barra's rough waves, where a skipper of a large vessel "Dawn Ross" described the impacts of the storm as the "worst in 20 years". There were also stranded people at the Fastnet Lighthouse.

All schools, colleges, universities and childcare facilities reopened on 9 December.

=== United Kingdom ===
As a precaution, Wales' railway administration has created emergency train schedules for Barra. Wind gusts of 31 m/s (70 mph) were forecasted to slash the area's coastal regions while a slightly lower 22 m/s (50 mph) for the mainland. A yellow weather alert was placed for Northern Ireland due to Barra as a result of the strong gusts being foreseen to impact the county. Same wind gusts were being expected. Scotland and England were also forecasted to see strong winds from Barra. Yellow alerts were placed for these areas. Flood and snow alerts were also issued. Many bridges were closed in Scotland and ferry operations were stopped as a precaution in the state and in Wales.

In Northern Ireland, some thousands of homes and businesses lost power. Derry also saw minor flooding. Rough waves also pounded cars that are near the seawall road on an area in the region. Due to the intemminent weather in Scotland, train operations from the region and down to England were halted. Several trees also led train operators to cancel their services. Snow conditions were also documented in A82 road and over South Lanarkshire. Gwynedd of Wales got its highest gust recording from the storm, at 38 m/s (86 mph). Many schools across the region also lost its roofing due to strong winds. Tree obstructions and minor flooding were also documented. According to the Met Office, except for Gwynedd that recorded its highest wind gust from the system for 8 December, County Down in Northern Ireland reported 34 m/s (76 mph) and Pembrey Sands at Dyfed collected 33 m/s (73 mph). 80 year-old Venetia Smith drowned on 7 December in the River Stour in Dorset after falling off a road bridge during the storm. A Dorset Council office building in Dorchester was damaged and closed for a number of days. A commercial plane in Manchester also had problems in landing, but made it successfully. Exmouth also saw large waves from Barra.

=== France ===
In France, the cold front associated with the storm gave heavy rains in the Landes, causing a pile-up on the Autoroute A63, disrupting rail traffic and flooding some roads on 8 December. The system also left large amounts of rain or snow in the Pyrenees and Eastern France, depending on the altitude.

=== Spain ===
In Navarre, a falling farmhouse led to the death of a woman. A 61-year-old man was also reported missing and has not yet been found. Floods in Villava – Atarrabia also reached above their homes, forcing 20 people to leave their houses. 60–70 individuals also lost power in the city. The Arga River also overflowed, inundating all residences under floodwaters; the floods from the reservoir was described as the "worst in 20 years". Transportation services and some residential areas were also isolated. The Vice President of Navarre, Javier Remírez also noted that the province is under a "very critical and very extraordinary situation" due to the event. 3,650 households also lost electricity in the community. Snow also impacted the northern portion of the country. Pamplona, Lacunza, Zubieta also saw major inundation problems. Deba River in Basque Country also broke its banks, affecting a hospital in a town while flooding warnings were issued in Aragon and Cantabria. Two more streams in Burgos' north also overflowed, impacting and cancelling school classes in two areas. Several rescues are also conducted in the county.

According to Agencia Estatal de Meteorología (AEMET), on 8 December, the San Sebastian Airport in Gipuzkoa reported a wind gust of 143 km/h (40 m/s). Posada de Valdeon, Soto in León registered a rainfall of 113.6 mm (4.47 in) on the next day.

== See also ==
- Weather of 2021
- 2021–22 European windstorm season
- Storm Arwen
- Hurricane Ophelia affected similar areas in Ireland
