= Heat dome =

Extreme heat caused by a stationary high-pressure system

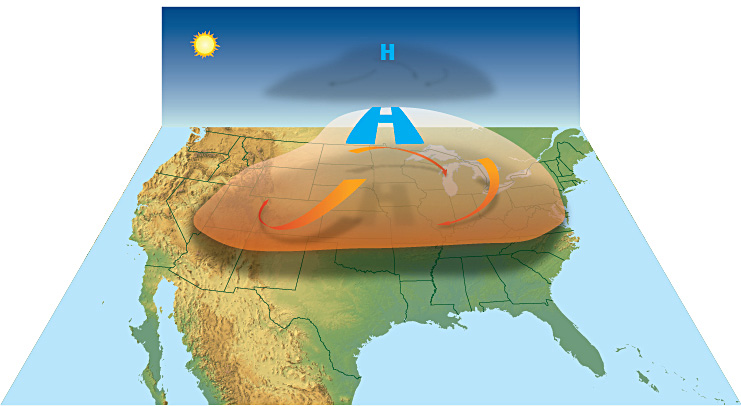
US National Weather Service diagram of a heat dome over the United States

A heat dome is a weather phenomenon consisting of extreme heat that is caused when the atmosphere traps hot air as if bounded by a lid or cap. Heat domes happen when strong high pressure atmospheric conditions remain stationary for an unusual amount of time, preventing convection and precipitation and keeping hot air "trapped" within a region. This can be caused by multiple factors, including sea surface temperature anomalies and the influence of a La Niña. The upper air weather patterns are slow to move, referred to by meteorologists as an Omega block.

The term is often overextended in media terminology to refer to any heat wave situation, though heat waves differ, as they are periods of excessively hot weather not necessarily caused by such stationary high-pressure systems. The term "heat dome" is also used in the context of urban heat islands.

== Characteristics ==
Heat domes are typically associated with minimal cloud cover and clear skies, which allow unhindered penetration of solar radiation to Earth's surface, thereby intensifying overall temperatures.

They also cover a large geographical area with higher atmospheric pressure than the surrounding regions. The high atmospheric pressure area acts like a lid on the atmosphere and causes warm air to be pushed to the surface, holding it there over extended durations.

Heat domes maximise heating of the Earth by allowing sunlight to penetrate to the Earth's surface.

== Formation ==
Formation of a heat dome

Heat domes can arise in still and dry summer conditions, when a mass of warm air builds up, and the high pressure from the Earth's atmosphere pushes the warm air down. The air is then compressed, and as its net heat is now in a smaller volume, it increases in temperature. As warm air attempts to rise, the high-pressure dome above it acts as a cap, forcing the air downward and causing it to get hotter and hotter, resulting in increased pressure below the dome.

The 2021 Northwest heat dome was formed in this way, as a stagnant high-pressure system intensified local temperatures, blocked cooling maritime breezes, and hindered cloud formation. This allowed uninterrupted solar radiation to further warm the air, and the rising warm air was pushed back down by the high-pressure system, creating a self-sustaining cycle of heating.

Increases in sea surface temperatures across the Northern Pacific, particularly off the coast of Washington, Oregon, and British Columbia, create favorable conditions for the formation of high atmospheric pressure domes, which can lead to the development of heat domes.

=== Relationship to climate change ===
Studies indicate that human-induced climate change plays a significant role in the formation of heat domes, as heat domes are more likely to occur in higher atmospheric temperatures. The occurrence of heat domes contributes to the positive feedback loop of increased climate change by resulting in overall higher atmospheric temperatures.

== Effects ==
=== Other weather events ===
Heat domes coincide with stagnant atmospheric conditions, exacerbating air quality issues. Common byproducts include increased smog and pollution levels. Heat domes can intensify heat waves by interacting with other weather systems, such as frontal boundaries. They can also contribute to drought by increasing the rate of evaporation and reducing soil moisture. In areas such as California's Central Valley, heat domes exacerbate drought conditions by increasing the rate of evaporation amongst crops and native vegetation.

=== Ecosystem ===
Previous heat domes have been linked to widespread tree damage, primarily due to high solar irradiation. Alongside foliar scorching as a result of heat stress, the evolutionary creation and success of heat-resilient foliar species were byproducts of heat domes.

Heat domes increase the thermal stress of organisms living in intertidal ecosystems, a factor that has previously led to the deaths of marine species during the 2021 North American Heat Dome.

=== Community ===
The occurrence of heat domes has contributed to increasing climate change concerns. This was particularly demonstrated among British Columbians, who in previous studies displayed higher levels of climate change anxiety following the 2021 North American Heat Dome.

Heat domes put communities at risk of increased mortality rates. Deaths resulting from heat domes are more likely to impact susceptible and marginalized populations, who are less likely to have access to air-conditioned living spaces.

== Examples ==
The 2025 European heatwave has been attributed to a heat dome, and human-caused climate change is likely.

The 2021 Western North America heat dome garnered attention for its unprecedented intensity and duration in recent years, leading to significant societal impacts, including widespread power outages and increased wildfire activity.

It resulted in agricultural losses exceeding US$600 million in the Pacific Northwest alone, devastating fruit crops and causing widespread livestock mortality that affected regional food supplies for several months. This further emphasized the urgency of addressing climate change in order to reduce the occurrence and severity of such events. Addressing greenhouse gas emissions and adopting strategies are significant steps in lessening the frequency of extreme heat events in 2021.

In 2021, a record-breaking heat dome based in British Columbia caused 595 community deaths, a record for similar atmospheric events. Most households in the broader Vancouver lack air conditioning, resulting in individuals being highly susceptible to deaths caused by heat such as heat exhaustion and heat stroke. The study on this event emphasizes the importance of public health and providing more air conditioning and urban green spaces.

Persistent heat dome led to extensive wildfires, crop failures, and a surge in mortality rates during the Russian heatwave in 2010. The far-reaching consequences of this event, affected by economic and social factors, reverberated globally, impacting the interconnectedness of regional weather phenomena and agricultural markets.

=== Heat waves ===
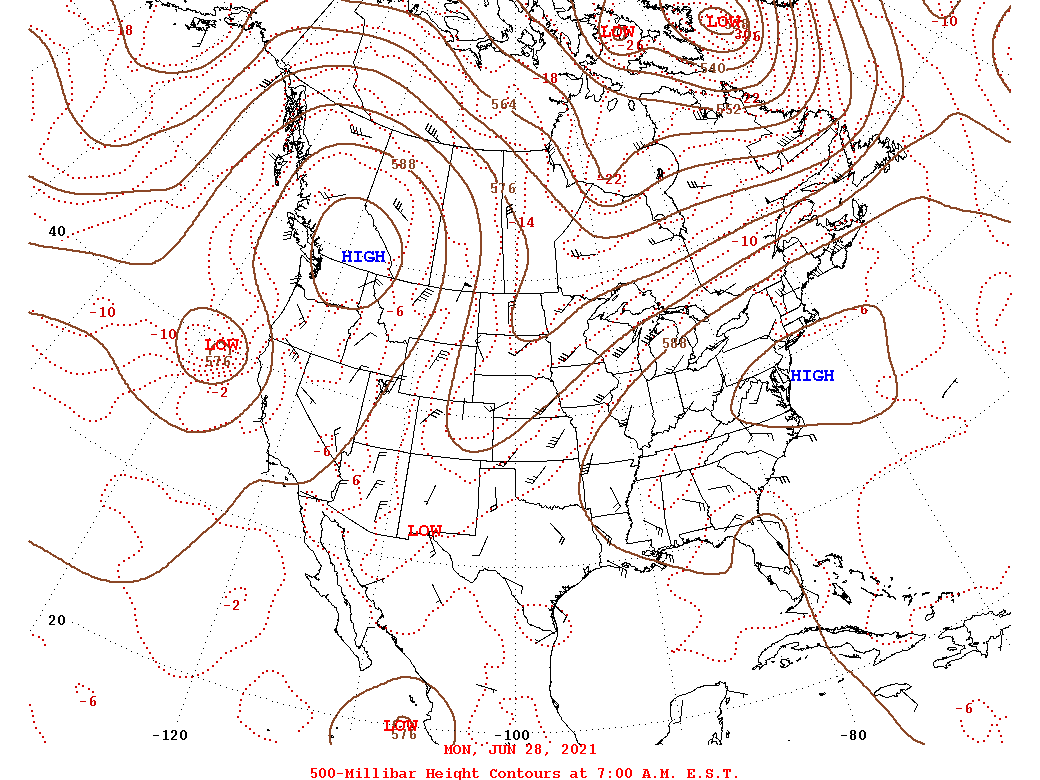
The heat dome of the 2021 Western North America heat wave, over west Canada and the Northwest United States. The "high" pressure at left is the heat dome

- 1936 North American heat wave
- 2012 North American heat wave
- 2018 North American heat wave
- 2021 Russia heatwave
- 2021 British Columbia wildfires
- 2021 Western North America heat wave
- 2023 Western North America heat wave
- 2023 South America heat wave
- 2025 European heatwave
- 2026 European heatwaves

== Future ==
Research points to a projected increase in stationary waves circulating around North America following the occurrence of heat domes. These are the same waves that lead to extreme heat events, indicating a higher likelihood of similar events taking place in the future. Research studies have shown that the development of heat domes is generally improbable, however the increasing level of concern surrounding the impact of climate change highlights that heat domes may no longer become a rare occurrence.

=== Mitigation ===
Techniques to mitigate the effects of heat domes often involve urban planning, public health initiatives, and community interaction. Strategies include increasing green areas, using cool roofs and improving ventilation in urban areas. Public agencies provide support to vulnerable populations, reducing adverse heat-related impacts through the following methods: heat health warning systems, data monitoring, cooling centers, water management, and climate change suppression, among other efforts. Educational campaigns increase awareness of heat safety, increasing the effectiveness of other mitigation methods.

== See also ==
- Cold-air damming
- Heat wave
- Extreme weather

== Sources ==
This article incorporates text from a free content work. Licensed under CC BY 4.0 (license statement/permission). Text taken from The Impact of Disasters on Agriculture and Food Security 2025, The Food and Agriculture Organization of the United Nations.
