= 2021 heat waves =

List of heatwaves

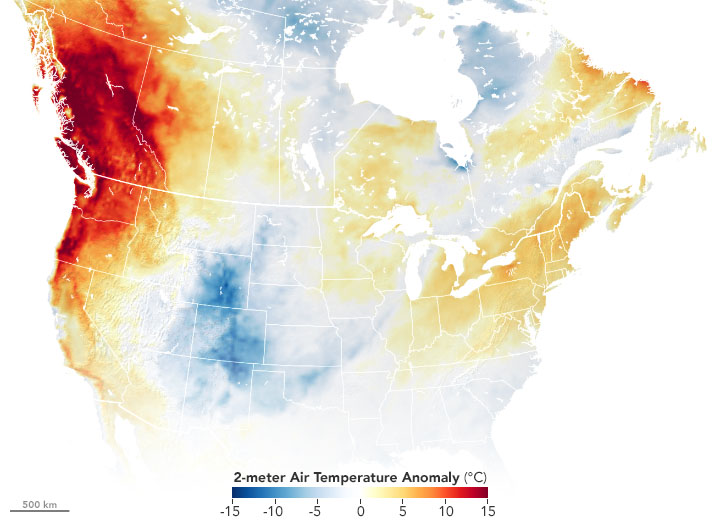
Air temperature anomalies during the June 2021 Western North America heat wave, compared to 2014–2020 baseline

This page documents notable heat waves worldwide in 2021.

In June 2021, a heat wave set a record high nationwide temperature in Canada. The event led to thousands of heat-related deaths.

== List ==
=== February ===
Across Europe and parts of Asia, unusually high-temperatures in the late-winter period were reported from 20 February until 28 February 2021.

=== June ===
==== Eurasia ====
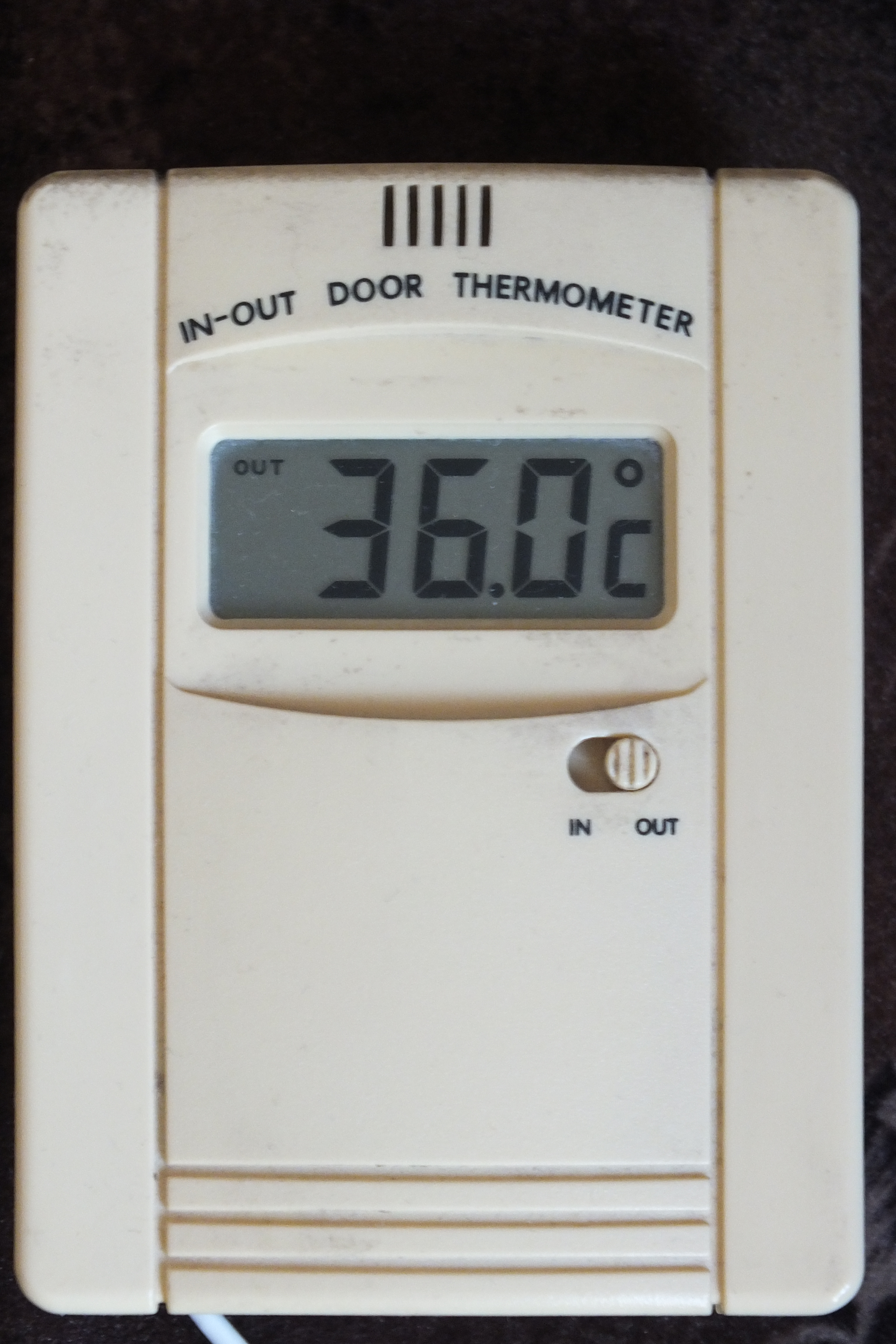
Temperature on 23 June in Moscow (17:18 UTC+3)

Parts of Russia and eastern Europe were hit by record-breaking heat wave in June and July, with temperatures in the Arctic Circle above 30 °C (86 °F) and highest June temperature were recorded in Moscow and St. Petersburg. Temperature 20 °C (36 °F) above average hit central and eastern Europe, with the highest anomalies centered on Scandinavia and parts of western Russia, due to the heat dome effect. Anticyclone conditions over Russia resemble those in the 2010 heat waves, with parts of Siberia were 15 °C (27 °F) higher than normal. The shores of the Barents Sea saw hotter temperatures than beaches in Italy and southern France, around 25–30 °C (77–86 °F) for several days.

In June 2021, Kazakhstan faced a record-breaking increase in temperatures in western parts of the country, specifically the Kyzylorda, Mangystau, and Turkistan regions. As a result, the Kazakh meteorological service Kazhydromet forecasted that an extreme drought would take place. By 7 July, the temperatures reached up to 46.5 °C (115.7 °F). Prior to the announcement of increased temperatures, photos from the Mangystau Region emerged on social media which showed emaciated horses on a verge of dying. According to the Ministry of Agriculture, the cause for situation was due to lack of pasturage in the area as a result of several climatic conditions, and that measures would be implemented to prevent the further casualties of livestock. The Khabar Agency on 16 June 2021 reported that approximately 2,000 livestock had died with Kazakh lawmakers calling for a state of emergency to be implemented in the Mangystau and Kyzylorda regions, citing the problems in farmers whom were unwilling to feed the cattle due to inflated costs for animal feed. In July 2021, due to worsening situation, Kazakh President Kassym-Jomart Tokayev called on Agriculture Minister Saparhan Omarov to resign, citing his failure to provide assistance to struggling farmers. On 13 July, a state of emergency was introduced in the Aral District in an attempt to solve the shortage of feed. In a visit to Mangystau Region, Acting Agriculture Minister Erbol Qaraşukeev pledged that 1.9 billion ₸ would allocated in order to reduce the costs of livestock feed and that a ban on its exports would be placed as well.

==== North America ====
An extreme heat wave affected much of Western North America from late June through mid-July 2021. Rapid attribution analysis found this was a 1000-year weather event, made 150 times more likely by climate change. The heat wave affected Northern California, Idaho, Western Nevada, Oregon, and Washington in the United States, as well as British Columbia, and, in its latter phase, Alberta, Manitoba, the Northwest Territories, Saskatchewan, and Yukon, all in Canada. The heat wave appeared due to an exceptionally strong ridge centered over the area, whose strength was linked to the effects of climate change. It resulted in some of the highest temperatures ever recorded in the region, including the highest temperature ever measured in Canada at 49.6 °C (121.3 °F). The exact death toll is unknown, and growing. On July 6, preliminary statistics released by the British Columbia Coroner Service indicated 610 more sudden deaths than usual occurred in the province and Alberta logged 66 excess deaths in the week of the heat wave; the Chief Coroner of British Columbia later said that in the week between June 25 to July 1, 569 deaths were confirmed to have happened due to heat-related causes. Confirmed deaths in the United States include at least 116 in Oregon (of which 72 are in Multnomah County, which includes Portland), at least 112 in Washington and one death in Idaho; though an analysis by The New York Times suggests that around 600 excess deaths occurred on the week the heat wave passed through Washington and Oregon.

=== July ===
In July, a heat wave in Europe led to record-breaking temperatures in the UK and Ireland.

=== August ===
A heat wave impacted North America in August 2021. The heat wave was the second of the summer for the Pacific Northwest. A state of emergency was declared in Oregon. The National Weather Service issued excessive heat warnings for the Portland metropolitan area (including Vancouver, Washington), most of the Columbia River Gorge, and the Willamette Valley. Cooling centers were opened in Portland. Oregon's climatologist said the heat wave is "an indicator of a troubling trend".

== See also ==
- Weather of 2021
