= 2021 Western North America heat wave =

2021 heat wave in the Pacific Northwest and Western Canada

Meteorological history
- Duration: June 25, 2021 - July 7, 2021
- Heat wave
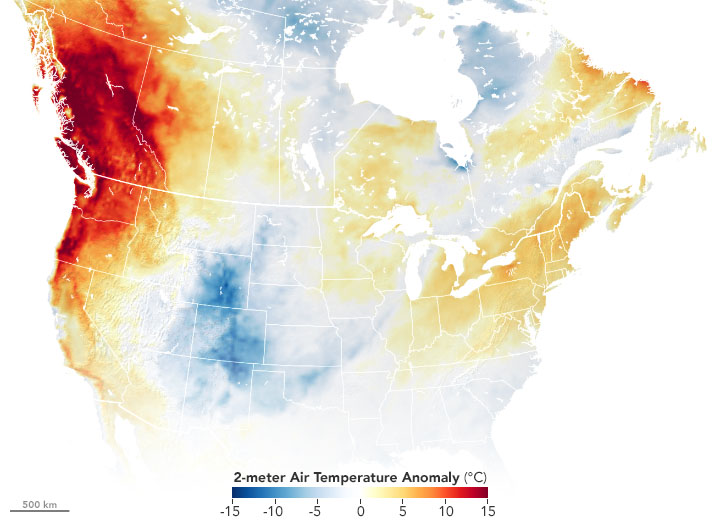
- Air temperature anomalies across North America on June 27, 2021, compared to 2014–2020 baseline
- Max temp: 49.6 °C (121.3 °F), recorded at Lytton, British Columbia

Overall effects
- Fatalities: 1,400 deaths (estimated), 914 (confirmed): 800 excess deaths (685 confirmed) in Canada; ~600 excess deaths (229 confirmed) in the United States
- Damage: United States: ≥$8.9 billion (2021 USD)
- Areas affected: Western Canada; Northwestern United States

The 2021 Western North America heat wave was an extreme heat wave that affected much of Western North America from late June through early July 2021. The heat wave affected Northern California, Idaho, Western Nevada, Oregon, and Washington in the United States, as well as British Columbia, and in its latter phase, Alberta, Manitoba, the Northwest Territories, Saskatchewan, and Yukon, all in Canada. It also affected inland regions of Central and Southern California, Nevada, and Montana, though the temperature anomalies were not as extreme as in the regions farther north.

The heat wave was characterized as a heat dome because of the extreme temperatures and the exceptionally strong ridge centered over the area, whose probability of formation was linked to the effects of climate change by multiple studies. It resulted in some of the highest temperatures ever recorded in the region, including the highest temperature ever measured in Canada at 49.6 °C (121.3 °F), as well as the highest temperatures in British Columbia, in the Northwest Territories, in the state of Washington as well as a tied record in Oregon. The record-high temperatures associated with the heat wave stretched from Oregon to northern Manitoba, and daily highs were set as far east as Labrador and as far southwest as Southern California.

The extreme heat sparked numerous, extensive wildfires, some reaching hundreds of square kilometers in area. The eponymous Lytton wildfire destroyed the village of Lytton, British Columbia, the day after the site set the record high temperature for Canada. Extreme heat also damaged road and rail infrastructure, forced closures of businesses, disrupted cultural events, and melted snowcaps, in some cases resulting in flooding. The heat wave also caused extensive damage to agriculture across the region, resulting in substantial loss of crop yield and the death of 651,000 farm animals. The National Oceanic and Atmospheric Administration (NOAA) estimated that the heat wave caused at least $8.9 billion (2021 USD) in damages in the USA.

The death toll has been estimated to exceed 1,400 people, with at least 808 deaths estimated in western Canada. The Chief Coroner of British Columbia reported that 619 deaths were recorded due to heat exposure in the week from June 25 to July 1. Confirmed deaths in the United States included at least 116 in Oregon (of which 72 were in Multnomah County, which includes almost all of Portland), at least 112 in Washington, and one death in Idaho. An analysis by The New York Times suggests that around 600 excess deaths occurred the week the heat wave passed through Washington and Oregon.

== Meteorological history ==
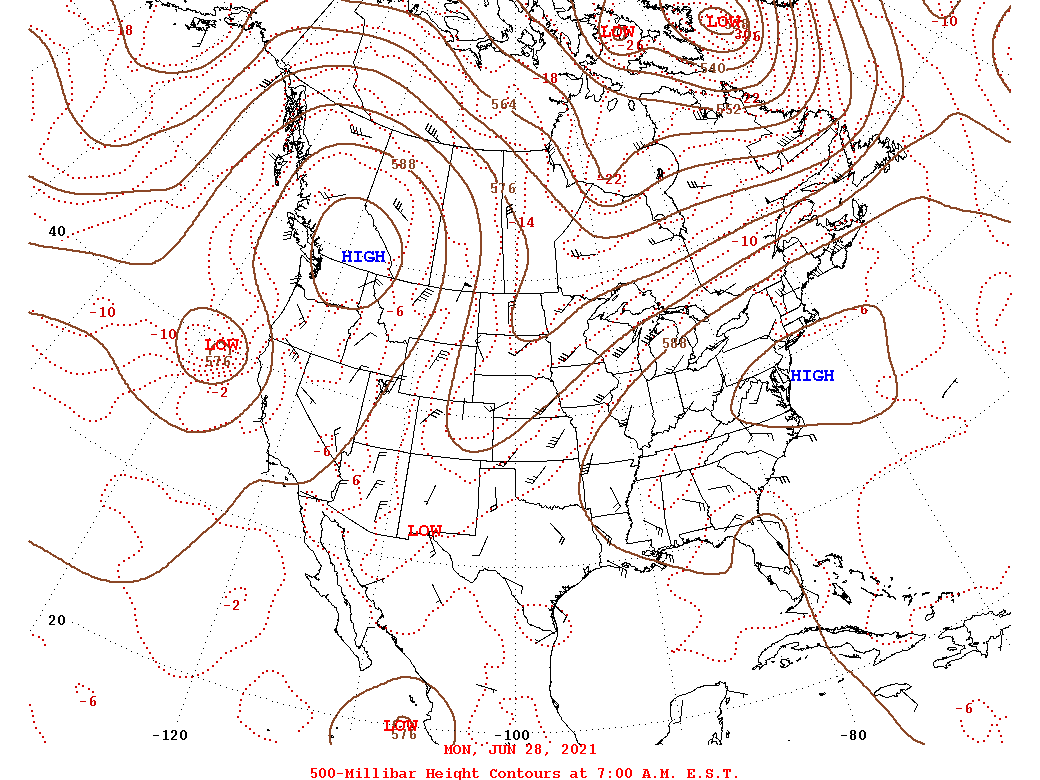
Geopotential height chart at 500 millibars at 11:00 UTC on June 28, 2021. The center of the heat dome, which caused the heat wave, can be seen over the British Columbia Interior.

On June 23, the United States National Weather Service warned of an approaching heat wave in the Pacific Northwest, whose origins could be traced to torrential rains in China. There, the warm, moist air rose and was eventually entrained by the jet stream, which transported it east over cooler waters. When that air current encountered an upper-level high-pressure zone, also called a ridge, it started to significantly deform, being forced to accommodate the high-pressure area south of the jet stream's meander. At the same time, the Southwestern United States was enduring an intense drought which caused higher-than-average temperatures, leading to a similar heat wave earlier in June. The remnants of this heat wave then moved north to the Pacific Northwest. Six days later, Environment Canada issued a heat warning for Alberta, Saskatchewan, British Columbia, Manitoba, Yukon, and Northwest Territories.

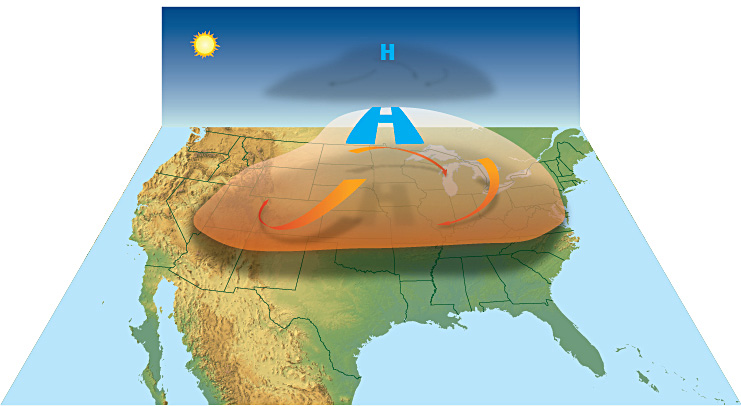
Formation of a heat wave via a heat dome. In this scenario, the high-pressure area forces the air downwards, heating the air column, but even as the air becomes increasingly lighter and hotter due to the sun's energy, it cannot escape the dome because of the high pressure. This situation has been compared to pressure cooking.

These conditions made way for a massive Rex block. In this situation, a high-pressure area stays in place for an extended period and does not let cyclones pass through it, which otherwise could have cooled the region; in this particular case, the high-pressure area was sandwiched between two stationary lows, which prevented the high-pressure region from moving. As the Pacific Northwest experienced severe drought conditions, the already warm air heated more quickly than usual, which intensified the ridge so strongly it caused a heat dome. The downslope winds from the Cascades and other mountain ranges further warmed the air in the valleys.

After the heat dome hovered over British Columbia and the Northwestern United States for a few days, it began to move eastward, bringing relief to the Pacific coast but breaking records east of the Rocky Mountains, particularly in the northern parts of the Prairie provinces. Sweltering conditions were observed as far east as Northwest Ontario. By July 4–5, the remnants of the heat dome crossed Hudson Bay and, weakened somewhat by the cool waters, entered Quebec, and after that, Labrador, briefly triggering temperatures of around 30 °C (86 °F).

=== Climate change and additional factors ===
Climate change in Canada and in the United States are widely considered to have worsened the heat wave's unprecedented intensity and duration. According to a rapid attribution analysis, the heat wave would have been highly unlikely in the absence of anthropogenic climate change, which increased the likelihood of such a heat wave at least 150-fold. A further study in Nature Climate Change estimated that its occurrence was projected to increase rapidly with further global warming, possibly becoming a 10-year event in a climate warmed 2 °C relative to pre-industrial levels.

Broader climate shifts may have also contributed to worsening the heat wave; data provided by Verisk shows that the Pacific Northwest is among the fastest-heating regions in the continental United States and southern Canada. The urban heat island effect could have further exacerbated the impact in cities. Based on historic data, several meteorologists noted that this phenomenon should be expected to occur only once over a thousand or several thousand years, while David Sauchyn, a scientist at the University of Regina, said that climate models had been predicting a heat wave of a similar intensity to happen in late 2020s at the earliest.

A paper in Communications Earth & Environment found that the heat dome in the Pacific Northwest was 59% longer (27 days duration versus 17 days), 34% larger, and had 6% higher maximum amplitude, comparing the observed event and the event after detrending. Overall the strength of the heat dome was 86% greater than the same event would have been without background warming.

== Temperature records ==
Much of the Pacific Northwest, normally known for its temperate weather in June, experienced temperature anomalies of 20–35 °F (11–19 °C) above average during this heat wave. The heat wave, combined with other extreme weather occurrences elsewhere, yielded the hottest June on record in North America. It also contributed to the hottest June on record locally and regionally for many locations in Canada and the USA.

=== Canada ===
The highest temperatures of the heat wave were registered in British Columbia, but areas as far east as Ontario were affected by the event. As of June 29, 2021, 103 all-time heat records were set across Western Canada.

==== British Columbia ====
View source data.

On June 27, there were 59 weather stations in B.C. that set records for hottest temperatures recorded. These were largely beaten in the following days (Kamloops, for instance, registered 45.8 °C (114.4 °F) on June 28 and 47.3 °C (117.1 °F) on June 29, the peak temperature recorded in a major population center in the region).

In Metro Vancouver, West Vancouver set a record of 40.6 °C (105.1 °F) on June 27, and on the following morning on June 28, set its record daily minimum of 24.5 °C (76.1 °F), the highest daily minimum anywhere in Greater Vancouver. In White Rock, the record daily minimum of 20.9 °C (69.6 °F) and a record high temperature of 38.5 °C (101.3 °F) were both set on June 28. Pitt Meadows recorded a temperature of 41.4 °C (106.5 °F) for a record high on June 28, the highest anywhere in Greater Vancouver, and the record highest daily minimum set the following morning on June 29 at 21.5 °C (70.7 °F).

On June 28, records were set in Squamish, British Columbia at 43.0 °C (109.4 °F), Abbotsford at 42.9 °C (109.2 °F), Port Alberni at 42.7 °C (108.9 °F) and Victoria at 39.8 °C (103.6 °F).

On June 29, the temperature in Lytton, British Columbia, hit 49.6 °C (121.3 °F), the highest temperature ever recorded in Canada, although a nearby more modern station reported that the extreme was 1 °C lower. The stations were temporarily isolated by the Lytton wildfire the next day. The record occurred after consecutively setting new record highs of 46.6 °C (115.9 °F) on June 27 and 47.9 °C (118.2 °F) on June 28. It is also the highest temperature ever recorded north of 45°N, the highest temperature in the U.S. or Canada recorded outside the Desert Southwest, and higher than the absolute maximum temperatures of Europe or South America.

==== Alberta ====
In Alberta, the highest heat was observed in the period from June 29 to July 1. Banff 37.8 °C (100.0 °F), Beaverlodge 40.5 °C (104.9 °F), Cochrane 35.0 °C (95.0 °F), Fort McMurray 40.3 °C (104.5 °F), Jasper 41.2 °C (106.2 °F), Grande Prairie 41.5 °C (106.7 °F), Hendrickson Creek 38.3 °C (100.9 °F), Nordegg 37.2 °C (99.0 °F), Red Earth Creek 40.1 °C (104.2 °F) all saw the strongest heat ever measured in these communities, most after breaking all-time records of the previous day.

Calgary noted 36.3 °C (97.3 °F) on June 29 and July 1, which stopped just 0.2 °C (0.4 °F) short of the highest observed temperature ever and beating the all-time records for June and July. Edmonton also saw temperatures approach the absolute maxima – the city centre registered 37.0 °C (98.6 °F) on June 30, while the Edmonton International Airport, near Leduc, hovered around 33 °C (91 °F) from June 29 to July 1.

==== Territories ====
In the Northwest Territories, on June 28, Nahanni Butte set a regional record at 38.1 °C (100.6 °F). Two days later, Fort Smith, just north of the Alberta border, reached 39.9 °C (103.8 °F), which beat the previous all-time territorial record, registered in the same place in 1941. It was also the new highest reliably recorded temperature above 60 degrees latitude.

Yukon was largely bypassed by the heat wave, but on June 28, some areas in the territory went over 30 °C (86 °F), including Whitehorse (30.3 °C (86.5 °F)) and Teslin (31.1 °C (88.0 °F)), both of which were daily records.

==== Saskatchewan ====
Saskatchewan's heat records were mainly concentrated in the northern parts of the province. Stony Rapids saw the mercury reach 39.8 °C (103.6 °F) on June 30, an all-time high. Record temperatures were also set at Key Lake Airport and Collins Bay Airport on July 1, both at 37.0 °C (98.6 °F), as well as in Uranium City (38.0 °C, 100.4 °F). July highs were also observed in these settlements on the first day of the month, breaking 26 daily records across the provence.

Elsewhere, the heat arrived slightly later. Saskatoon reached 35.4 °C (95.7 °F) on July 1 and beat the monthly record the following day, at 40.5 °C (104.9 °F), a tenth of degree below the all-time record. La Ronge registered an all-time high with a reading of 37.9 °C (100.2 °F). Regina, like most of the southern part of the province was spared the extremes reached in the northern parts, with a maximum of 35.0 °C (95.0 °F) on July 2.

==== Manitoba ====
In a similar way to Saskatchewan, the majority of heat records (including all-time highs) were noted in the northern parts of the province. The remote community of Tadoule Lake observed a high of 38.1 °C (100.6 °F), beating the previous all-time record by 6.2 °C (11 °F). A record high was also observed at Lynn Lake (38.0 °C, 100.4 °F), while Churchill, on the shore of Hudson Bay, registered 34.1 °C (93.4 °F), the highest temperature for July. 25 daily records were set on July 3, including 35.0 °C (95.0 °F) in Winnipeg.

==== Ontario ====
Northwestern Ontario did not see all-time high records beaten, but several daily records were pushed higher: on July 3, Thunder Bay saw a high of 34.3 °C (93.7 °F), Geraldton saw 33.6 °C (92.5 °F), while the hottest temperature was in Pickle Lake, at 35.2 °C (95.4 °F).

==== Newfoundland and Labrador ====
Weakened by interaction with the Hudson Bay waters, the heat wave still managed to beat some daily records in Newfoundland and Labrador. Hopedale registered 25.1 °C (77.2 °F) on July 5, while Happy Valley-Goose Bay reached 33.2 °C (91.8 °F) the following day.

=== United States ===
The heat wave broke numerous records by large margins, particularly in the Pacific Northwest. Several large cities, including Portland, Seattle, and Spokane, experienced high temperatures far exceeding 100 °F (38 °C) and low temperatures higher than the area's normal daily high temperatures. The heat wave beat Washington's all-time heat record in Hanford (120 °F, 49 °C) and tied one for Oregon (119 °F, 48 °C at two places, including at Pelton Dam). The same temperature was noted in Peshastin in Chelan County, Washington, where temperatures soared to 119 °F (48 °C) on June 29, slightly surpassing the previous all-time high for the state.

==== Oregon ====
On June 26, Portland broke its previous all-time record high temperature of 107 °F (42 °C), set in July 1965 and August 1981, with a temperature of 108 °F (42 °C). It topped that record again on June 27, with a temperature of 112 °F (44 °C), and on the following day, the temperature increased further to 116 °F (47 °C).

Salem, Oregon, reached 105 °F (41 °C) on June 26, its record high temperature for June. It then hit 113 °F (45 °C) degrees on June 27, breaking the record for the highest temperature ever recorded in that city, which was previously 108 °F (42 °C). Salem then exceeded the previous day's record temperature on June 28, with a maximum temperature of 117 °F (47 °C). However, not all the regions of the mid-Willamette Valley experienced extreme heat on June 28. Regions south of Salem, for example, did not see highs above mid-90s Fahrenheit on that day, likely due to cooler ocean air in the area.

The Willamette Valley also experienced extreme overnight temperature drops (twice the size of normal fluctuations) due to cooler air coming from the ocean – Portland cooled a record 52 °F (29 °C) during the night, while Salem almost approached its all-time largest temperature swing, from 117 °F (47 °C) to 61 °F (16 °C).

==== Washington ====
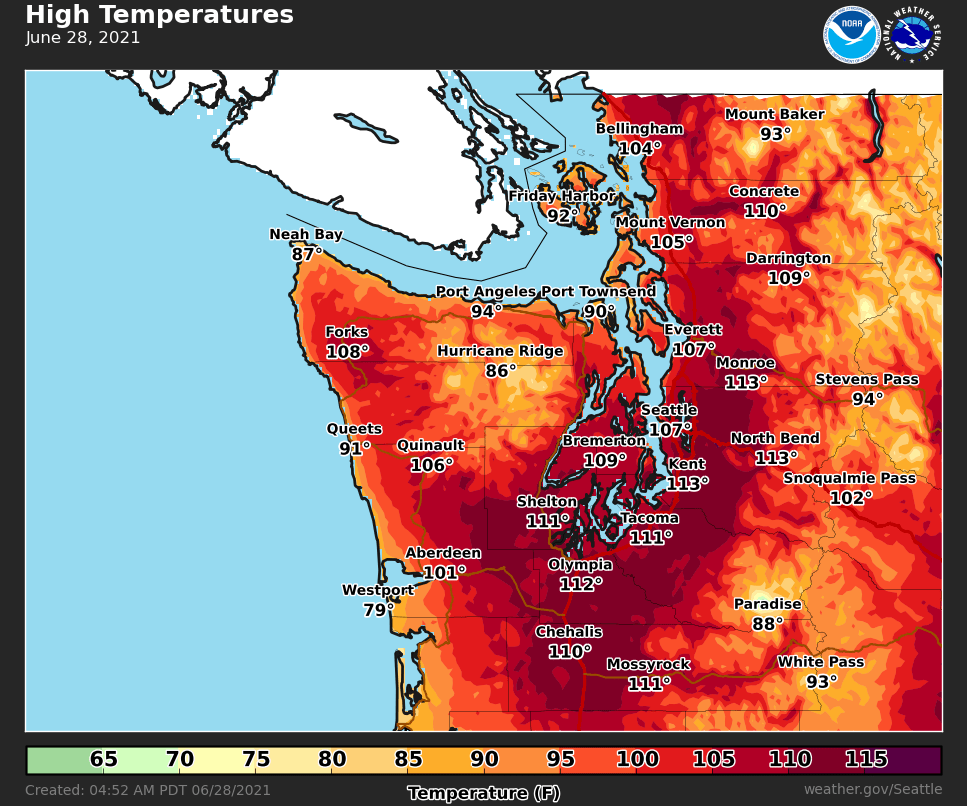
Predicted high temperatures for western Washington on June 28, 2021

Between 1894 when records began and June 2021, temperatures over 100 °F (38 °C) were only recorded three times; however, Seattle-Tacoma International Airport recorded three consecutive days of temperatures over 100 °F (38 °C). The temperature rose to 104 °F (40 °C) on June 27, beating the previous record of 103 °F (39 °C), and the record was broken again the following day by a high of 108 °F (42 °C). The suburbs farther from the coast were even hotter – a local radio station in Maple Valley reported temperatures of 118 °F (48 °C).

On June 26, Port Angeles recorded an all-time record high of 95 °F (35 °C). The Quillayute Airport weather station, also on the Olympic Peninsula, reported 110 °F (43 °C) on June 28, exceeding its prior record by 11 °F (6 °C).

On Mount Rainier, normally freezing temperatures reached 73 °F (23 °C) degrees above 10,000 feet (3,000 m) on June 27. The heat wave was blamed for greater glacier melt on Mt. Rainier than had been seen in the state in the past 100 years.

East of the Cascades, several locations saw new temperature records set over a period of a few days. On June 29, Spokane, Ephrata and Omak all reached their all-time records, at 109 °F (43 °C), 115 °F (46 °C) and 117 °F (47 °C), respectively. Extremely warm minimum temperatures were also recorded: Ephrata's thermometers did not go lower than 82 °F (28 °C) on June 29.

It was even hotter on and near the Oregon-Washington border. In The Dalles, Oregon and Dallesport, on either side of the Columbia River, daytime high temperatures reached 118 °F (48 °C), tying the then all-time record for the state of Washington and beating the June statewide record by 5 degrees Fahrenheit. The same heat was measured in Tri-Cities on June 28–29. The state's new official temperature record was set at 120 °F (49 °C) on June 29 in Hanford. The heat wave resulted in 128 all-time high temperature records set for individual weather stations across the state, including in Seattle.

==== California ====
Temperature records were observed in the northern part of the state. South Lake Tahoe observed 91 °F (33 °C) on June 28, beating the previous June record, and tied or beaten daily records for three days in a row. In Redding, the temperatures soared to 114 °F (46 °C) on June 27, a daily record, while in Siskiyou County, Montague tied an all-time high for the county, at 109 °F (43 °C).

Southern California was also impacted. Palm Springs registered 121 °F (49 °C) on June 27, surpassing the previous daily record, while other communities, such as Palmdale, Campo and Idyllwild, tied with them.

==== Idaho ====
Being largely on the margin of the high pressure dome, Idaho did not see temperatures as extreme as elsewhere. In Lewiston, on the border with Washington, 115 °F (46 °C) was noted on June 29, beating an all-time June record and becoming the third-highest temperature in the history of recordings for the city. Other localities in the Treasure Valley to the east were expected to sustain triple-digit heat for a week (which is in and of itself unusual) and in general to tie or beat daily records. Boise, for example, tied one for June 29 (105 °F (41 °C)) and for June 30 (104 °F, 40 °C), and also recorded nine consecutive days of temperatures exceeding 100 °F (38 °C), which tied the record for such a streak. Records were also beaten in the Idaho Panhandle, with Coeur d'Alene registering 109 °F (43 °C), which surpassed the previous highest temperature for June and equaled the all-time high for the city.

==== Montana ====
Most of Montana was placed on heat advisories, but the areas that were most affected by the heat wave were on the extreme northwest and eastern parts of the state. Kalispell and Missoula registered temperatures of 101 °F (38 °C) on June 29, both daily records and 1 °F (0.56 °C) short of the record for June; Libby succeeded in doing so, setting the plank at 109 °F (43 °C). In the eastern parts of the state, several daily records were also noted: Livingston reached 97 °F (36 °C) on June 30 and Miles City saw 105 °F (41 °C) two days later; Billings tied its 100 °F (38 °C) daily record on July 1 and had not fallen below 69 °F (21 °C) on July 3, while Glasgow bettered its July 1 record to 102 °F (39 °C), tied the daily high record the next day, and set the highest minimum temperatures on these days (72 °F or 22 °C on July 2).

=== Other temperature measurements ===
Ground temperatures in some locations were measured to be excessively high - in Wenatchee, Washington, it reached 145 °F (63 °C), while the pavement at an intersection in Portland, Oregon reached 180 °F (82 °C). These temperatures are not records however, as temperatures are normally measured in the shade at an altitude of 2 meters or 6 feet to eliminate the effects of sunshine and soil heating.

== Deaths and injuries ==
=== Canada ===
The heat wave was the deadliest weather event in Canadian history.

Over 1,000 deaths occurred due to the direct consequences of the heat wave (such as hyperthermia). Most of the deaths occurred in Canada – about 600 more deaths than usual were noted in British Columbia and 66 in Alberta. Although excess death measurements are not guaranteed to be caused by a specific event, the Chief Coroner of British Columbia stated that 569 casualties could be attributed to heat, and that in the prior five years, only three heat-related casualties had been registered. A later report put the heat-related death toll at 619.

A disproportionate number of heat-related deaths during the 2021 heat wave occurred in government-funded or licensed buildings such as long-term care facilities. Of the total heat-wave-related deaths, 47 people died in community living, assisted living or long-term care facilities. Further, 62 people died from heat exposure in social housing run or funded by the provincial government. Eight individuals who lived at Vancouver Mental Health and Substance use housing died. Records show indoor air temperatures in some long-term care facilities rose to over 30 °C during the heat wave. Some hospitals were also unable to keep temperatures in a comfortable range for patients and staff. At least two Lower Mainland and one Northern hospital recorded indoor temperatures of over 32 °C in the emergency department, while an acute care floor at Lions Gate Hospital got as hot as 38 °C.

In British Columbia, E-Comm emergency dispatchers answered nearly 15,300 calls on June 26–27, which was about 55 percent above normal for the month, and also dispatched ambulances 1,975 times on June 28 – the highest number ever recorded for the province. Delays for non-emergency calls reached up to 16 hours in extreme cases, and some ambulances were left inoperable due to a lack of staff, leading to hours-long delays. The handling of the crisis drew criticism from the paramedics unions, which forced Adrian Dix, the provincial healthcare minister, to change the leader of British Columbia's emergencies response management to Jim Chu, former Vancouver's police chief, and to appoint a chief ambulance officer.

=== United States ===
Deaths due to heat-related causes by county in the states of Idaho, Oregon and Washington in the United States, reported as of July 14, 2021 More than 50 deaths 10–49 deaths 5–9 deaths 3–4 deaths 1–2 deaths

In the United States, the death toll was lower but still in the hundreds: at least 116 deaths with confirmed heat-related causes in Oregon, at least 112 in Washington and one in Idaho. The New York Times analysis suggested that almost 450 excess deaths in Washington and 160 deaths in Oregon occurred during the heat wave.

On July 13, 2021, Multnomah County, Oregon published an analysis which found that a majority of deaths occurred in households which had no air conditioning or had only fans.

The heat wave caused a surge in 9-1-1 calls and emergency department visits, with later analysis finding almost 2,800 heat-related emergency department visits made on July 25–30. In Portland, the number of calls and the response times doubled, setting a record for the area. Non-emergency municipal services were also strained—on June 26, the non-emergency health information service (2-1-1) could not respond to 750 heat-related calls due to lack of working staff.

Some deaths also occurred among those seeking cooling in the Pacific Northwest's rivers. Two swimmers in Salem, who were trying to escape the heat, went missing in the Willamette River, another did so in Portland, while in Washington, three people drowned.

== Impact ==
=== Air conditioning ===
The heat wave was a problem for major cities in the Northwest due to a lack of air conditioning. Seattle and Portland had the lowest and third-lowest percentage of air-conditioned households among major metro areas in the United States, respectively. In 2015, a U.S. Census Bureau survey found that only 33% of Seattle homes have air conditioning (A/C) units, but that number increased to 44% in the 2019 survey following an increase in 90-degree days. The rate of air-conditioned households was even lower in British Columbia despite marked increases over the years – BC Hydro estimated that only 34% of the province's residents used air conditioning. In order to respond to the crisis, COVID-19 restrictions were waived for designated cooling shelters in Oregon, Washington, and British Columbia.

Trying to stay cool, residents in the Pacific Northwest and Alberta rushed to buy A/C units, which significantly increased their prices (some double the normal), created long installation and delivery backlogs, and ultimately made them unavailable in many stores. The pent-up demand for cooling forced electricity consumption to soar to record-high summer values. BC Hydro reported a peak of 8,500 MW, while several electricity providers in Washington also logged record values. It also prompted many power utilities in the area to formally ask to conserve energy. The Idaho State Capitol voluntarily turned off lights as a result and in the Spokane area, rolling power outages were used to reduce load on the grid.

Some residents chose to shelter from the heat by booking rooms in hotels, which often ran out of air-conditioned accommodation. According to CoStar calculations, the search for cooled rooms made the hotel occupancy in British Columbia reach the highest levels since the beginning of the COVID-19 pandemic, while Washington County, Oregon (suburbs of Portland) hotels reported occupancy levels more than double the rate from 2020.

=== Infrastructure ===
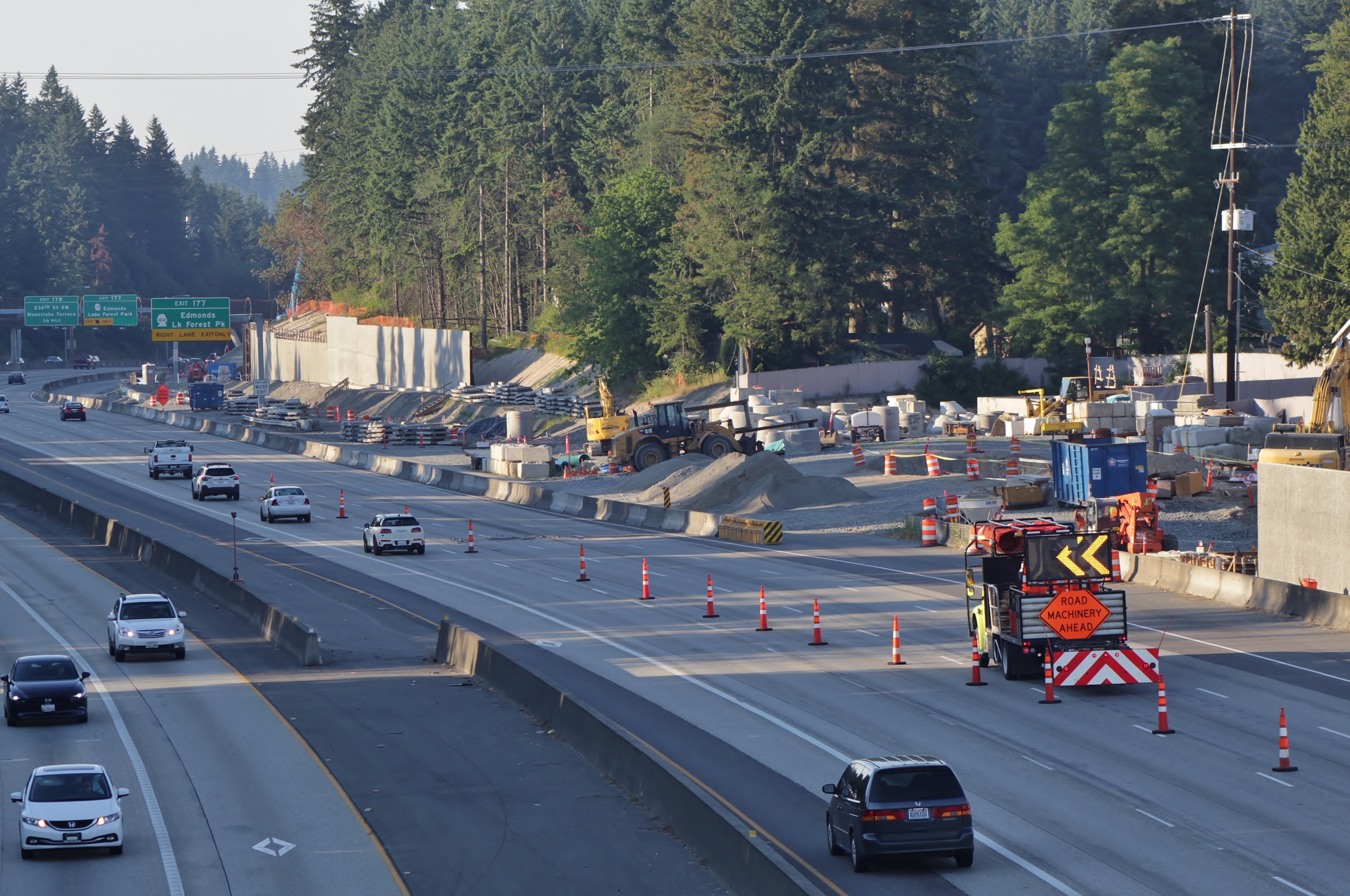
Emergency repairs to a heat-damaged section of Interstate 5 in Shoreline, Washington

The heat wave strained and damaged the region's infrastructure. It caused the sidewalks to buckle due to thermal expansion of concrete (57 sidewalks were damaged in Edmonton alone). In Washington and Oregon, damage was even more severe, leading to many road closures, including on some lanes of Interstate 5 and some state highways. In order to prevent thermal fatigue to Seattle's steel drawbridges, the city announced it would hose them down with cool water.

Public transportation also deteriorated in the sweltering conditions. Trains on Link light rail and Sounder commuter rail in Seattle operated at reduced speeds as a precaution against possible deformation of railroad tracks and overhead lines. In the Portland metropolitan area, TriMet suspended MAX Light Rail and WES Commuter Rail service for part of June 27 and all of June 28 because the cables from which the light rail cars drew electricity had sagged. Heat-induced rail distortion slowed down the passenger service on the route of the Amtrak Cascades. Moreover, school districts in Kamloops, Sooke (BC), Ephrata and Royal City (WA) all suspended school bus services, while Grant County, Washington limited the frequency of the buses under their management.

Many schools changed, shortened, or cancelled their class schedules to avoid daytime high temperatures. On June 28, 15 school districts in British Columbia's Lower Mainland, including all districts within Vancouver, closed due to the heat and their lack of sufficient cooling infrastructure; COVID-19 vaccination sites also endured disruption because of the weather conditions.

=== Businesses and workers ===
Local businesses faced a choice to continue to work under oppressive heat or make a day off. Some restaurants, food stands and cafés closed, fearing excessive heat at the workplace or spoilage of solid products. Similarly, numerous grocers were forced to shut down aisles and halt the sale of perishable goods or use plastic sheets as impromptu thermal shields, as refrigeration units failed under the load. The businesses that decided to stay open often provided de facto sheltering from heat or converted parts of buildings to cooling centers.

In a few cases, workers in California and Oregon protested the lack of air conditioning and staged local walkouts, and agricultural trade unions had also noted increased calls to strike. An SMS survey among 2,176 farmworkers in Washington (mostly in the eastern part of the state) conducted by United Farm Workers, a labor union, reported that almost all farmers did not consider protections mandated by the state OSHA sufficient. Among the surveyed, about two-fifths reported not having had shade, just under a third not having received heat illness prevention training and a quarter of respondents had no access to cool water.

After Sebastian Francisco Perez, an outdoor farm worker in St. Paul, Oregon, died while at work, Oregon OSHA faced calls to enforce safety rules for dealing with the heat wave, which had been first drafted in May. In response, Oregon's governor, Kate Brown, directed the agency to enforce the safety regulations for 180 days pending permanent implementation. In Washington state, the heat wave prompted state agencies to roll out additional protections. The Washington Post reported that the federal Occupational Safety and Health Administration was also considering a set of heat-related safety rules, whose implementation was said to be a "top priority" for the Biden administration.

=== Culture and sports ===
Sports events were disrupted by the heat wave. In Eugene, where the qualifiers for the 2020 Summer Olympics were held, the heat caused evacuation of the stadium in the afternoon and postponement of some events to the evening hours, as the temperature of the stadium's track exceeded 150 °F (66 °C).

Among other disruptions, a public swimming pool in Seattle's Rainier Beach neighborhood was closed due to dangerously high deck temperatures, so was a senior's center in Rathdrum, Idaho and a golf course on Vancouver Island. Some local concerts and outdoor events were also moved to avoid the heat.

=== Agriculture ===
Farms experienced serious losses, as the heat wave baked the fruits and berries or otherwise destroyed the crop and the drought conditions worsened. 10 million pounds of fruit per day were being harvested in the Pacific Northwest at the time the heat wave struck. Farmers in Eastern Washington, facing a loss of the cherry and blueberry crop, sent workers into orchards at night to avoid the heat in the day. The British Columbia provincial fruit growers association estimated that 50 to 70 percent of the cherry crop was damaged, effectively "cooked" in the orchards. Raspberry and blackberry farms in the Lower Mainland, Oregon and Washington have also endured losses, with estimates as high as 90% of raspberry crops damaged. Lettuce producers in the Okanagan Valley were also reported to be struggling with spoiled crops, as were those who grew Christmas trees and apples. In contrast, grapevines in Oregon and Washington did not seem to have sustained much damage, and corn in Skagit County, Washington was growing ahead of schedule.

Farmers in the United States have also seen reduced yields of soft wheat, which additionally saw the quality deteriorate (68% of wheat harvest in the Pacific Northwest was estimated by the USDA to be of poor or very poor condition). In the Prairie provinces, an infestation of grasshoppers is threatening cash crops and farmers were reported to be struggling with feeding cattle as hay and forage was found to be in short supply.

In Canada, the government of Saskatchewan extended additional drought support for farmers. In Alberta, lack of rain and excessive heat saw some grain plants catch fire, which has put the harvest in jeopardy. Further east, St. Laurent and Armstrong, Manitoba declared a "state of agricultural disaster" as the heat wave worsened the drought in the region, whose water reserves were already depleted.

=== Environment ===
==== Wildfires ====
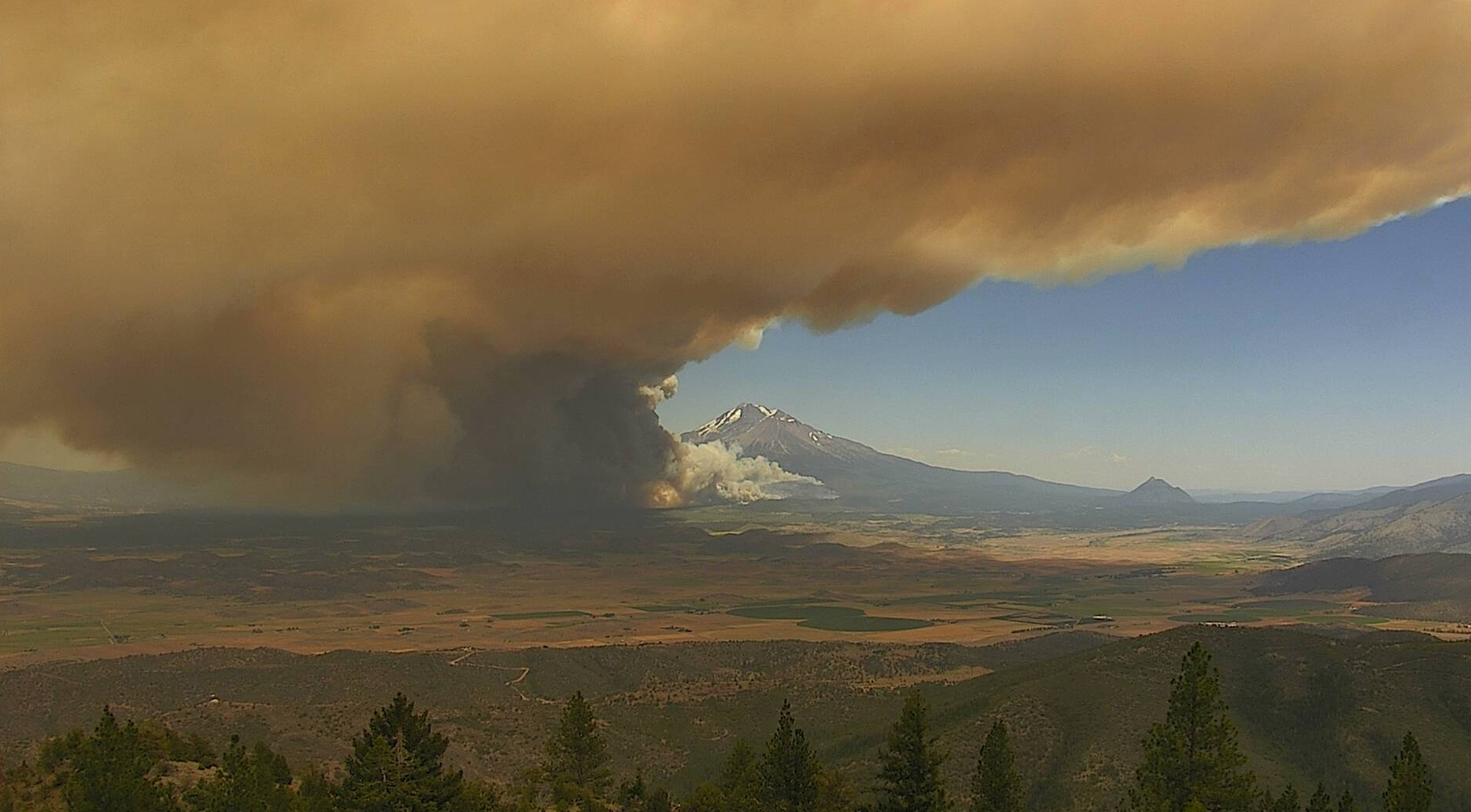
Wildfire burning near Mount Shasta, California, on June 28, 2021

The heat event sparked significant fires across the West Coast and Western Canada. One of the first fires to have struck the region was the Lava Fire, which eventually burned around 26,300 acres (106 km^{2}) in the west of Mount Shasta, California. Some of the largest fires, such as the Beckwourth Complex Fire, grew over 100,000 acres (405 km^{2}). Strong winds, which were causing fire tornadoes in some places, and dry vegetation hampered efforts to contain the fires. This led to road closures, such as the U.S. Route 97 and the North Cascades Highway, suspension of airport operations in Redmond, Oregon, and evacuation of settlements adjacent to the fires. The winds were so strong that residents of Medford, Oregon, c. 80 mi (130 km) north of the fires, reported having seen ash falling from the sky.

In British Columbia, 300 fires were ravaging the province, and the wildfire season destroyed around 2,230 km^{2} (860 mi^{2}) of forests by July 15, 2021. Pyrocumulonimbus clouds formed due to such extensive burning, producing several hundred thousand lightning strikes in one day and further complicating efforts to contain fires. Among the most known fires was the Lytton fire, which started on June 30 in British Columbia. The village of Lytton, which had beaten national heat records in the previous days, was ordered to be evacuated alongside several First Nations reserves. The town was eventually overrun by the fire, where it caused widespread destruction to the buildings. A local MP, Brad Vis, estimated damage to the settlement at 90%, while a local resident said that only "four or five houses, the post office and the church were still standing". The fire damaged roads, telecommunication and power facilities as well as the railway that comes through the settlement; and two people were killed sheltering from the flames. The fire in the settlement forced the closure of a section of British Columbia Highway 1, part of Trans-Canada Highway, as well as Highway 12, which ends in Lytton.

Despite deployment of more than 17,000 firefighters by mid-July, the size and number of the fires grew. Almost 1,000,000 acres (4,050 km^{2}) of forest were consumed by large wildfires, and more than 2,250,000 acres (9,110 km^{2}) were burnt in the United States as of July 15. The intensity of the fires moved the US fire preparedness alert level to 5 (highest) by July 14, which was an early start of the wildfire season. In addition to that, the Governors of Oregon, Washington, and Idaho declared states of emergency due to the extreme risk of wildfires. The Canadian army officials set up a coordination center in Edmonton in order to assist wildfire actions in British Columbia, which would be directed until July 19.

As the extreme heat and dry conditions persisted, scientists, firefighters and various politicians urged residents not to use fireworks during Independence Day celebrations in the Western United States and on Canada Day in Alberta. In addition to that, Washington and British Columbia enacted state-/provincewide bans on most open fires. Other areas such as Idaho and Manitoba used more localized approaches to burn restrictions.

As of September 14, 2021, the National Interagency Fire Center (NIFC) reported that 44,647 wildfires in the United States had burned 5.6 million acres of land. Similarly, the Canadian Interagency Forest Fire Centre (CIFFC) announced that 6,317 wildfires burned 10.34 million acres. Due to the earliness and severity of the wildfire season, the United States and Canada were unable to provide each other with aid to jointly combat fires. Initially, the NIFC declared that the United States and Canada had a preparedness level of 5, meaning it had the potential to exhaust firefighting resources. However, by September 20, 2021, the national preparedness level was reduced to 4 and 1 for the United States and Canada, respectively.

Prior to the start of the extreme heat wave, wildfire risk was greatly elevated by existing weather conditions. In April 2021, the North American wildfire season was predicted to be severe due to record drought conditions and high spring temperatures in the West. In May, more than 75% of the western United States experienced drought conditions, with 21% of these conditions being deemed as "exceptional drought", which is the most extreme level of drought. These extreme conditions result in a lack of moisture on the ground that is imperative for combating wildfires. In Arizona, there were 311 early wildfires in the first four months of the year, compared to 127 in the same period in 2020.

In July 2021, haze from West Coast fires resulted in air quality alerts in East Coast cities.

In Montana, evacuation orders had displaced around 600 people by early August.

On October 21, the national preparedness level was lowered to 1, while by November 5, a total of 48,725 wildfires had burned more than 6.5 million acres across the United States, according to the National Interagency Fire Center (NIFC).

==== Glacier melt ====
Extreme temperatures were also noted for mountain regions, which accelerated the melting of glaciers. Extensive melting occurred in the snowcaps of Banff National Park, which a glaciologist estimated that the Albertan snow from the mountains melted three times faster than usual. On Mount Rainier, the heat wave caused the mass of the snow cap to shrink by 30%, and Washington's glaciers in general have come through what glaciologists say to be the strongest melting episode in 100 years. Additionally, the increased melting of glaciers caused high amounts of runoff to be present within some rivers. The unexpected snowmelt resulted in extensive flash flooding down the creeks and rivers fed by the glaciers, triggering evacuation orders.

==== Wildlife and fisheries ====
As the surrounding air was extremely hot, water temperatures rose, which proved to be a hazard for aquatic wildlife. On the Pacific shore, temperatures in the intertidal zone reached up to 122 °F (50 °C) and more than a billion seashore animals, like clams, barnacles and oysters, died as a result of heat wave, impacting water quality. The deaths also impacted seafood producers, who faced losses of produce as it baked in the heatwave and started rotting. Inland, the population of sockeye salmon in Idaho rivers was preventatively caught out of water as increasing temperatures made it prone to disease; some salmon was also transported to cooler waters in the Columbia River. Fish kill, however, was not prevented in Alberta and appeared earlier than expected.

The heat wave caused an increase in vibrio bacteria levels in oysters in the Pacific Northwest, causing a record number of people to be sickened from vibriosis, an intestinal disease caused by the bacteria. As a result, the Washington State Department of Health urged people not to eat raw oysters and other shellfish from the region.

On the land, trees in Metro Vancouver dried up and started shedding leaves; the same happened to the fir canopy in Oregon on the side where the trees faced the sun. In Seattle, nearly a hundred juvenile terns, whose nests were on top of an industrial building, died when they plunged to the pavement below, presumably trying to escape the heat – those that survived were treated for burns. Scores of British Columbian raptors, apart from heat exhaustion, suffered from dehydration and starvation.

== See also ==
- 2020–22 North American drought
- 2021 Kazakhstan heatwave
- 2021 Russia heatwave
- 2021 wildfire season
- February 2021 North American cold wave
- 2023 Western North America heat wave
