= Lava Fire (2021) =

2021 wildfire in Northern California

- Part of the 2021 California wildfires
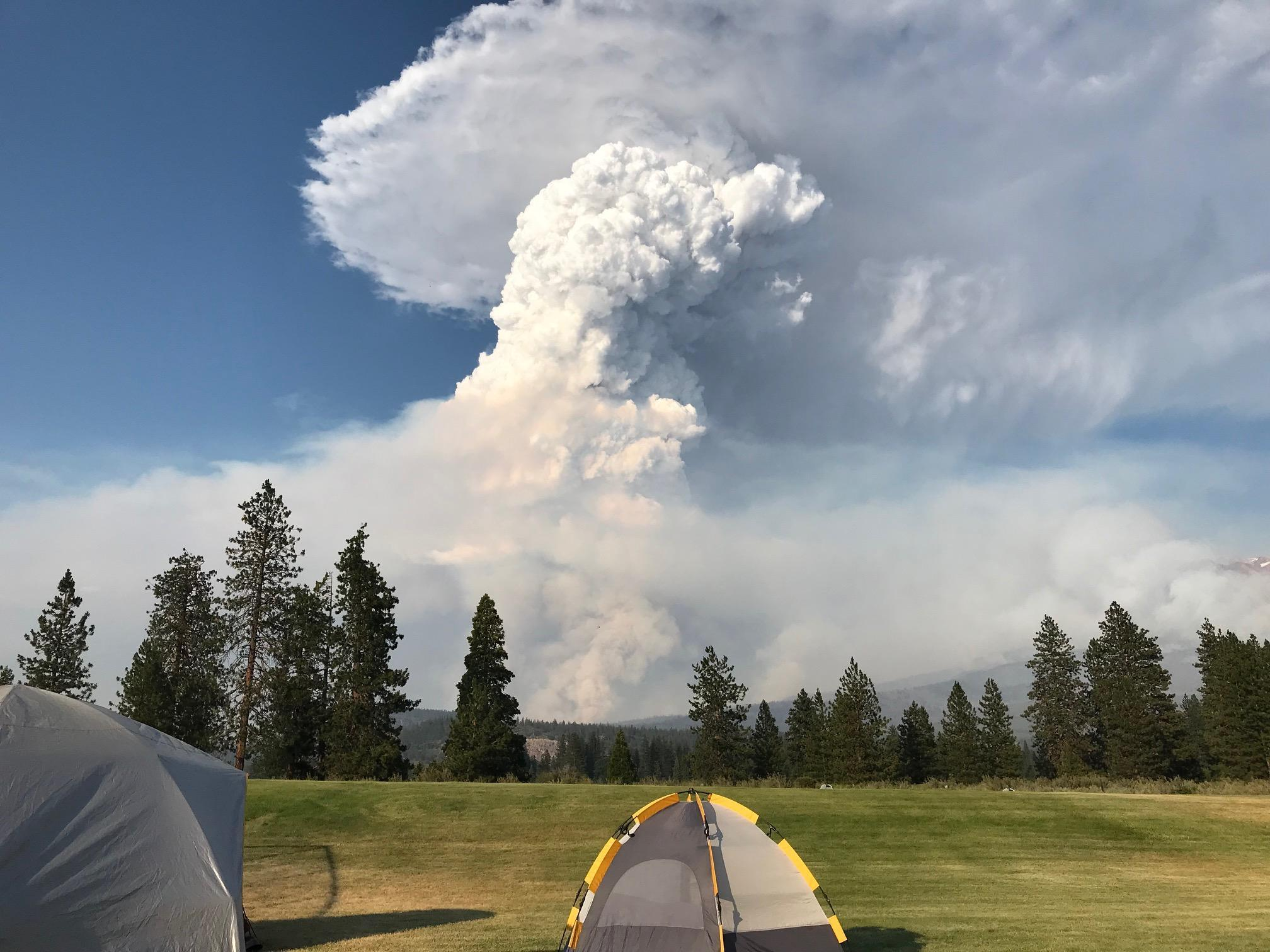
- The Lava Fire producing a pyrocumulus cloud on June 30
- Date: June 25, 2021 –; September 3, 2021
- Location: Weed, California
- Coordinates: 41.459°N 122.329°W

Statistics
- Burned area: 26,409 acres 41 square miles107 square kilometres10,687 hectares

Impacts
- Injuries: 6
- Structures lost: Destroyed 23; Damaged 1

Ignition
- Cause: Lightning

Map
- Location in Northern California

The Lava Fire was a wildfire that burned 26,409 acres (10,687 ha) along the slopes of Mount Shasta near Weed, California during the 2021 California wildfire season. The fire started on June 25, 2021 and was fully contained on September 3, 2021. The fire destroyed 23 buildings, including 14 houses, as well as damaged an additional building.

== Progression ==
The Lava Fire was first reported on June 25, 2021 at around 7:45 am PST. The fire grew relatively slowly over the following few days, being reported at 1,446 acres (585 ha) on June 28. However, the fire grew much more rapidly over the next several days, reaching over 13,000 acres (5,261 ha) the next day and over 23,800 acres (9,632 ha) by July 2. The growth was fueled by strong winds and dry vegetation amid an ongoing drought and a heat wave. Growth slowed after July 2, with the fire reaching 25,003 acres (10,118 ha) by July 8.

Sometime before June 30, 2021, the Lava Fire damaged a Union Pacific railroad trestle near Mount Shasta, California, significantly disrupting rail traffic on the west coast, including Amtrak's Coast Starlight service.

=== Cause ===
The cause of the fire is believed to be due to lightning.

=== Containment ===
Firefighters focused on securing the southern and western edges of the fire to protect populated areas like Weed, Mt. Shasta, Mount Shasta Vista, and Big Spring. Their containment efforts were hampered by extreme heat, difficult terrain, poor road access to the fire, and poor access to water resources. The fire reached 77% percent containment by July 15, 2021.

The fire was reported fully contained on September 3, 2021.

== Effects ==
=== Closures and evacuations ===
At least a few thousand people living near the foot of Mount Shasta were forced to flee their homes, including people in Lake Shastina, Juniper Valley, and the Mount Shasta Vista subdivision.

Evacuation efforts were complicated by ongoing tensions between Siskiyou County authorities and the local Hmong communities that operate cannabis farms in the area. One man was shot and killed by police after allegedly brandishing a firearm at authorities at an evacuation checkpoint. Additionally, 14 people were arrested in the Mount Shasta Vista subdivision after refusing to leave amid the evacuation order.

The Lava Fire forced the closure of few major transportation arteries through Siskiyou County. Highway 97 was closed between the city of Weed and the Oregon state line from June 28, 2021 until July 6, 2021. The fire caused damage to Union Pacific-owned trackage and the Dry Canyon Bridge, which forced the company to shut down that segment of the railroad on June 28 and reroute freight trains over the Donner Pass. The Union Pacific railroad closure forced Amtrak to effectively suspend passenger service between Sacramento and Eugene, Oregon, with the Coast Starlight service being suspended north of Sacramento and only Amtrak Cascades trains running between Seattle and Eugene. Passenger service on the Coast Starlight resumed between Eugene and Klamath Falls, Oregon on July 15, 2021 with a bus bridge to Sacramento. Full service on the Coast Starlight between Seattle and Los Angeles was restored on August 23, 2021 after the Dry Canyon Bridge was repaired.

=== Damage ===
The fire destroyed 23 buildings, 14 of which were residences. One additional structure was damaged. Six firefighters were injured battling the blaze.

== Gallery ==
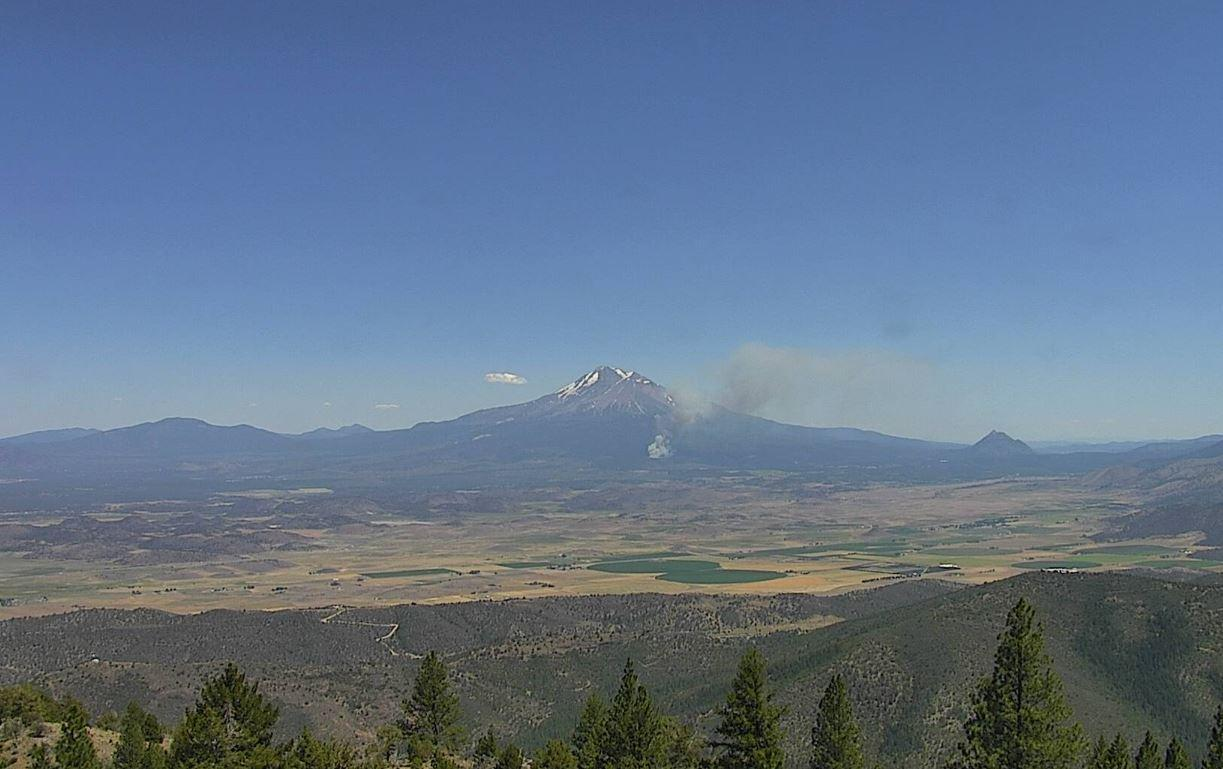
Lava Fire on June 26, 2021

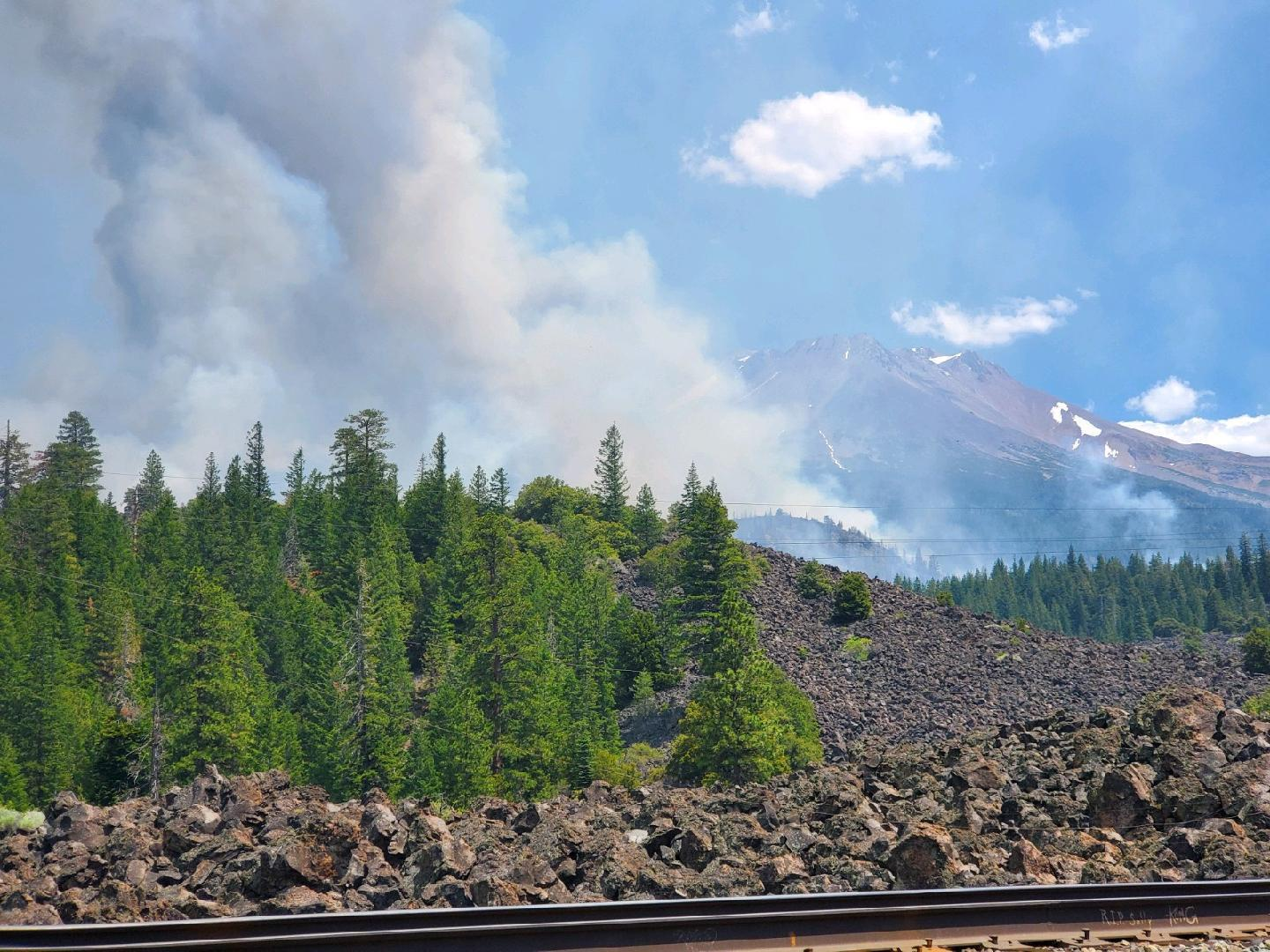
The fire on June 27, 2021

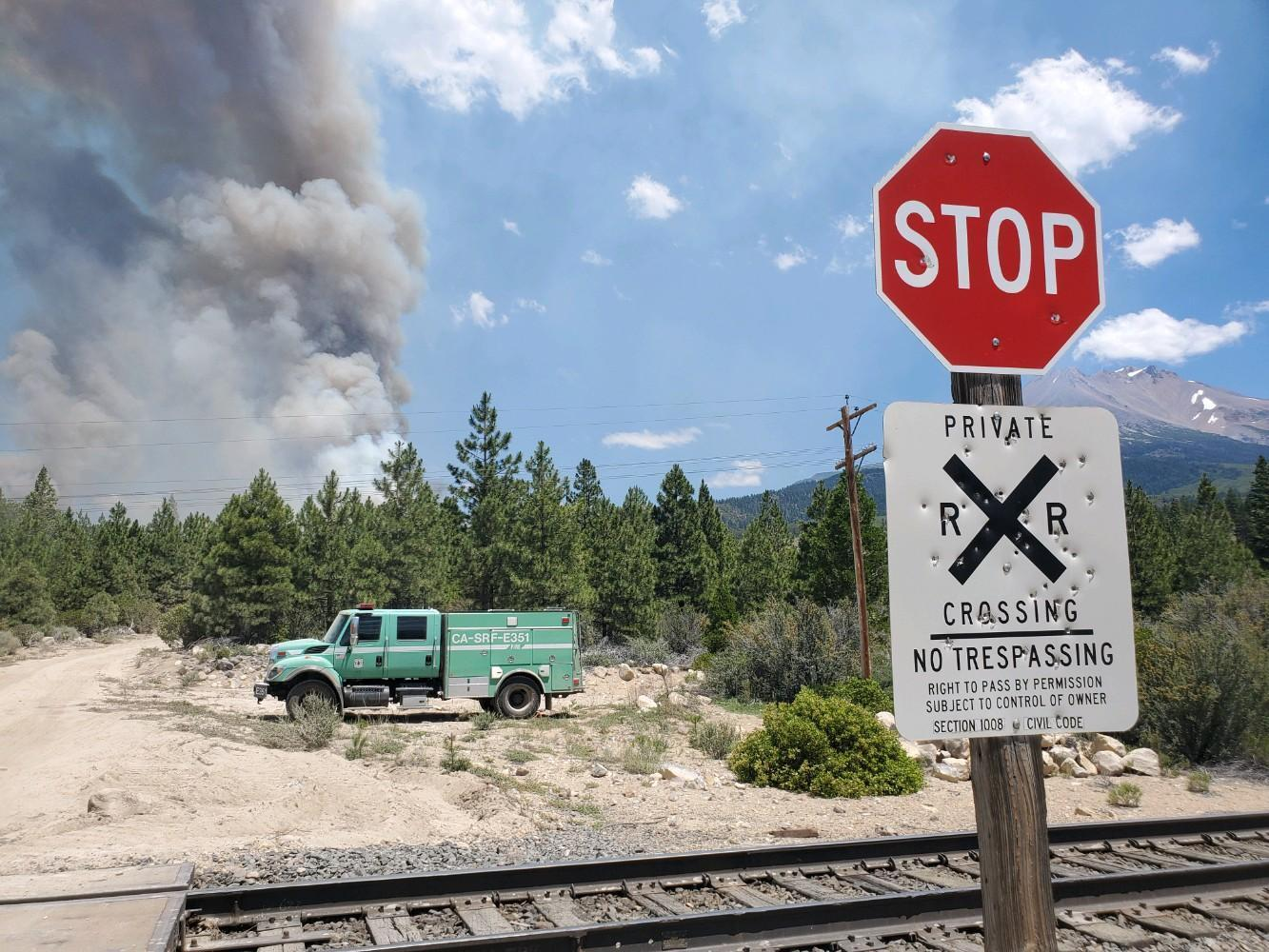
Lava Fire with a Forest Service fire engine in the foreground on June 28, 2021

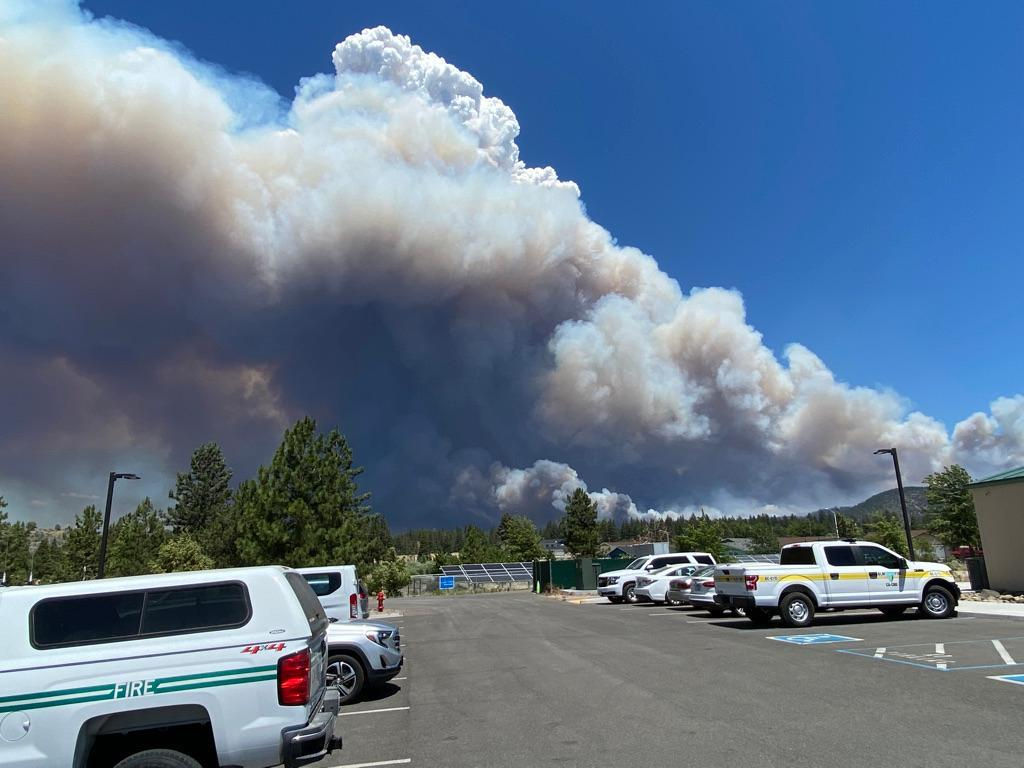
The fire seen from Weed High School on July 5, 2021

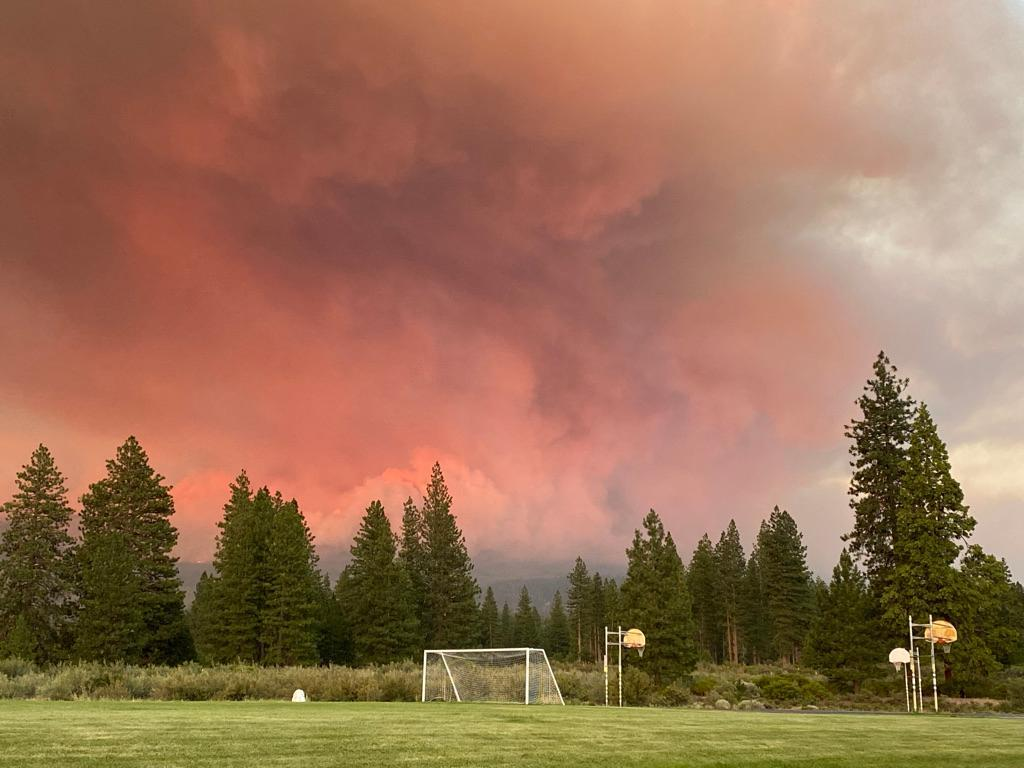
The fire from Weed High School on July 5, 2021

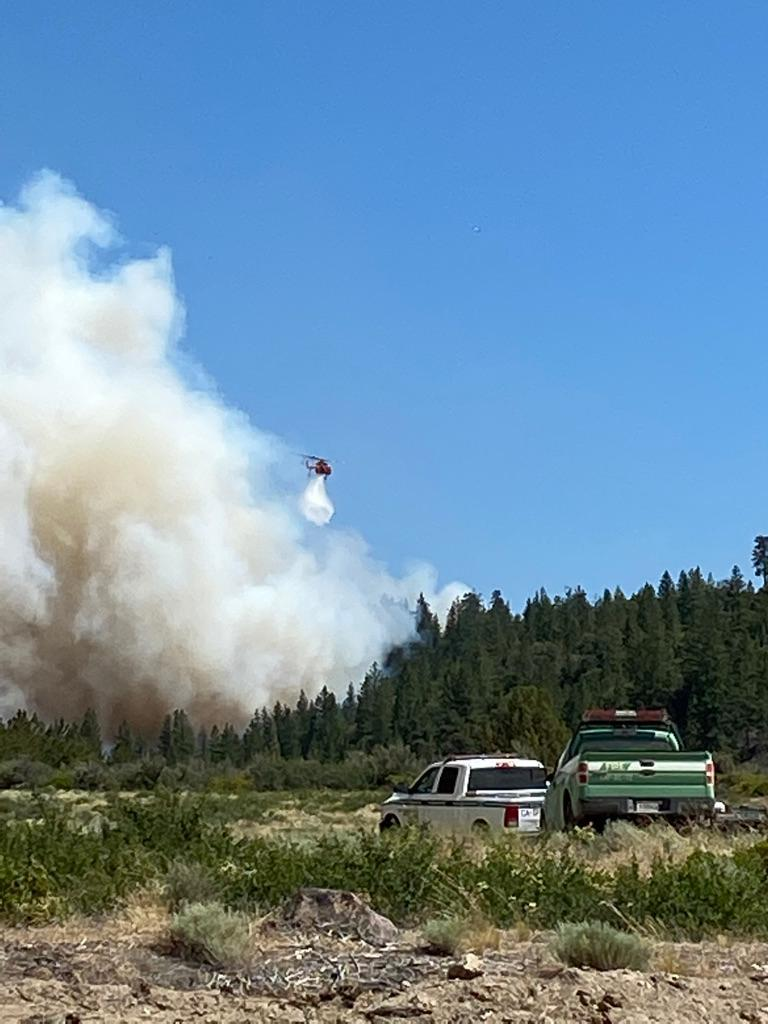
A helicopter dropping water over the fire on July 5, 2021

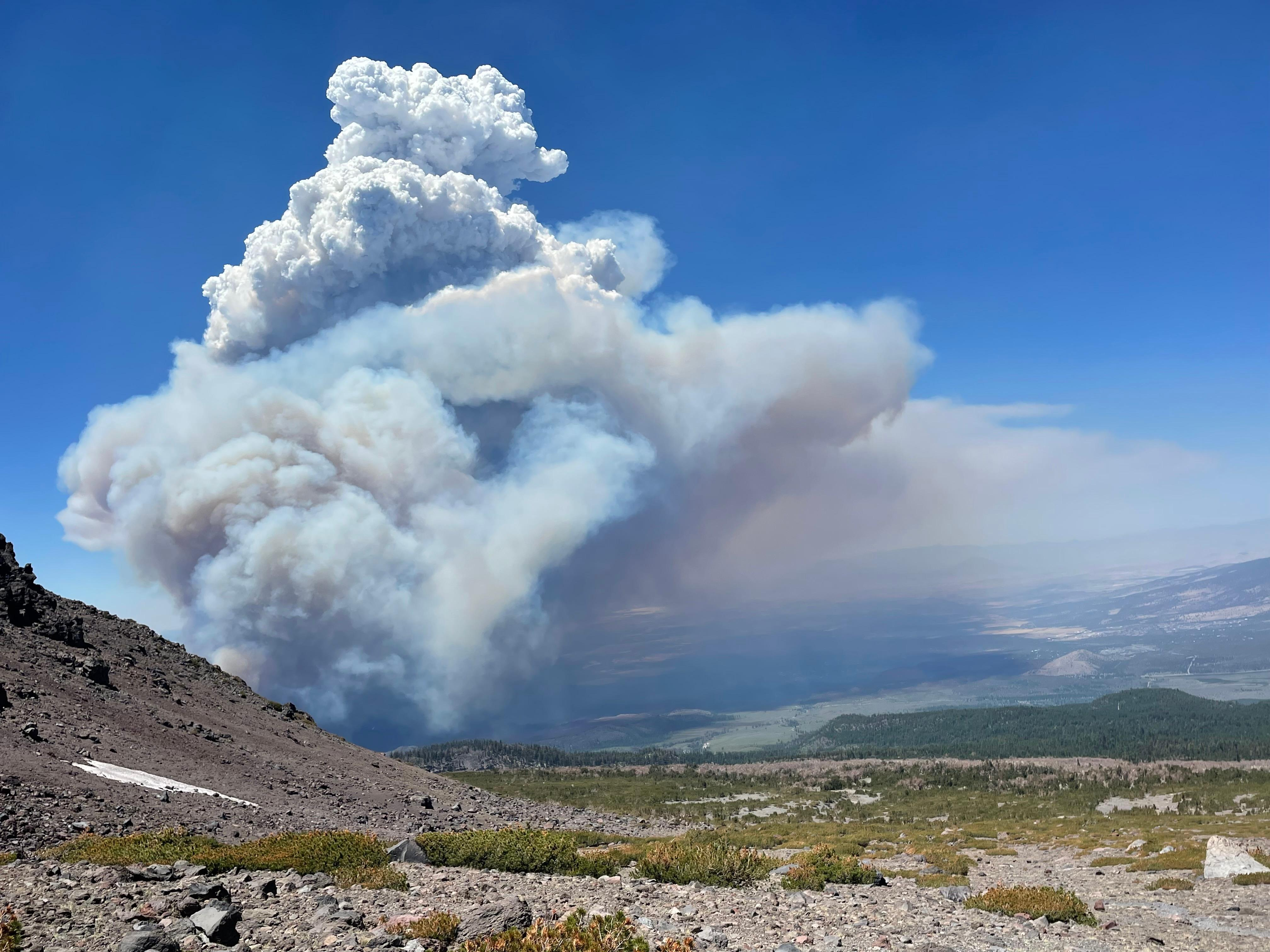
Lava Fire on July 5, 2021

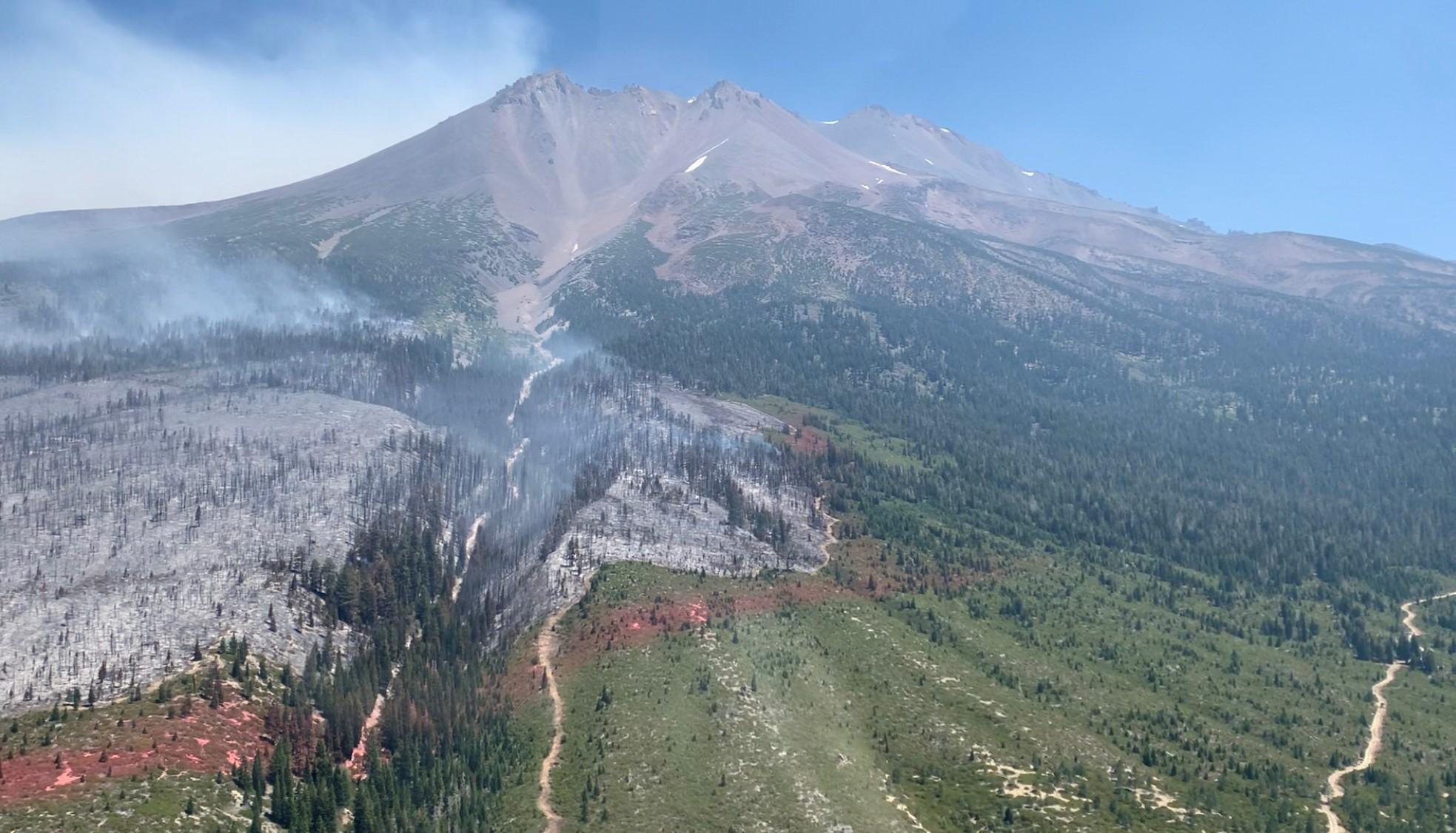
Burn zone and suppression work on the Lava Fire on July 5, 2021

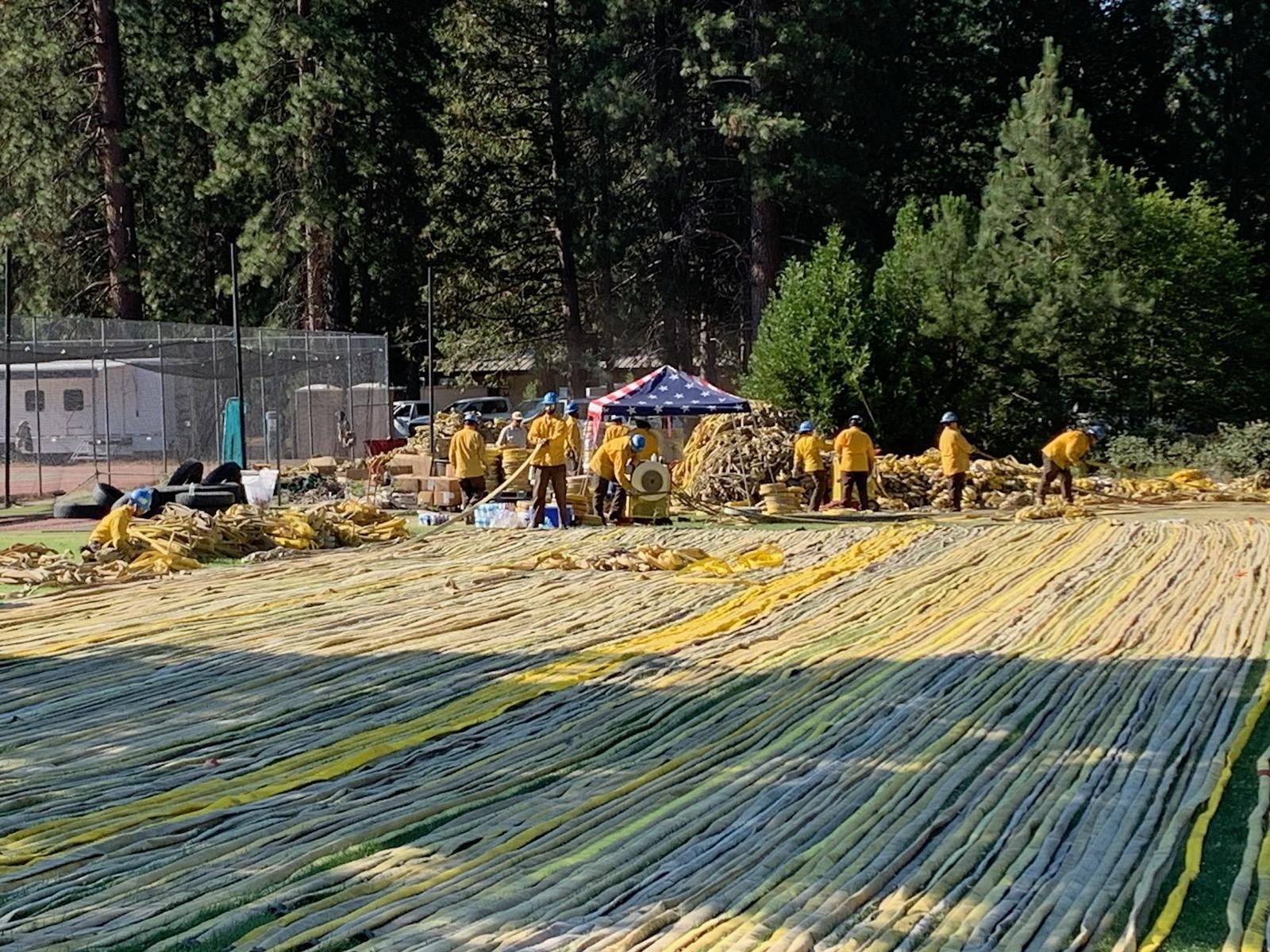
Hose lay on July 8, 2021

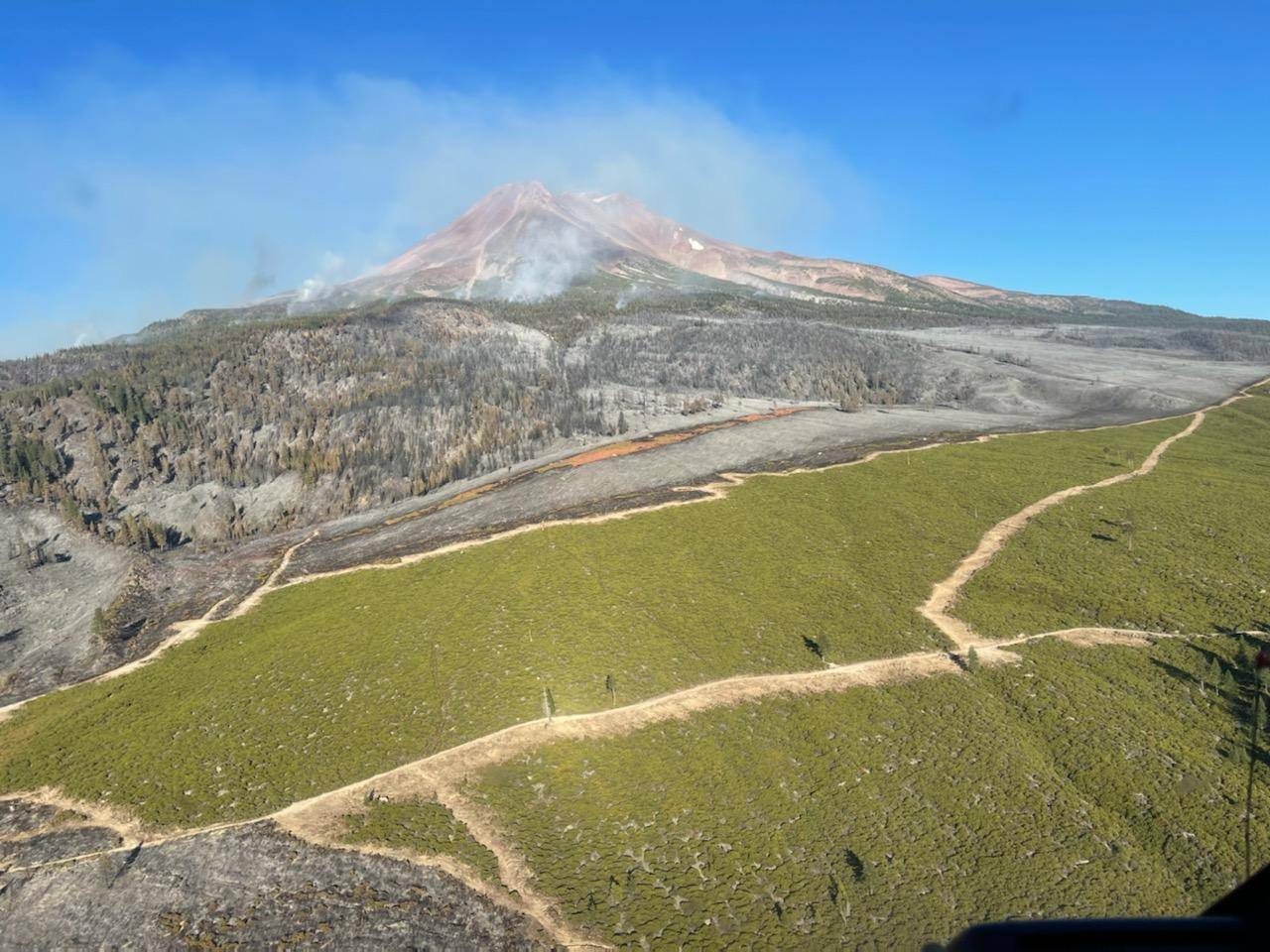
The fire seen from the air on July 8, 2021

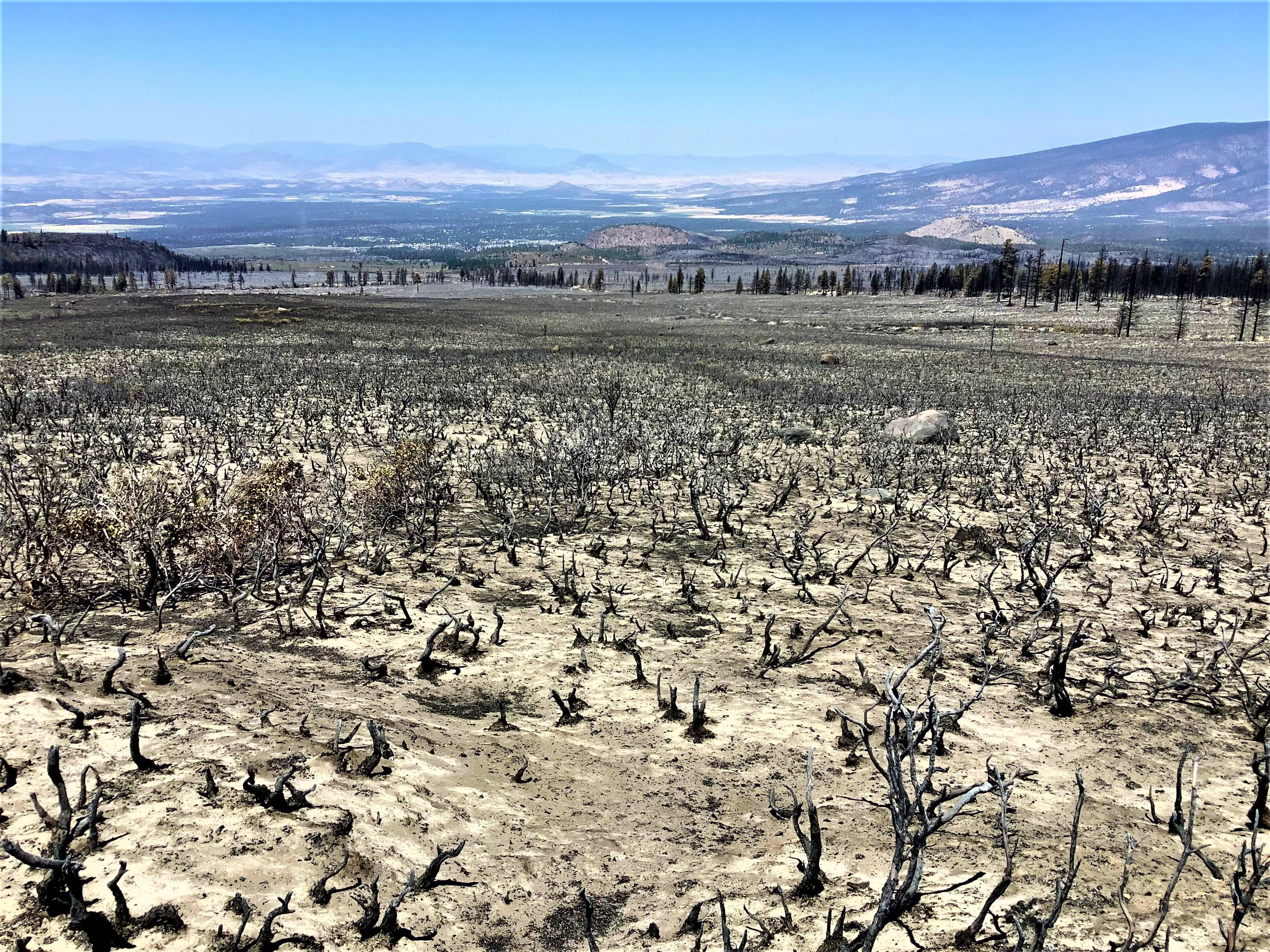
Burned area on July 28, 2021

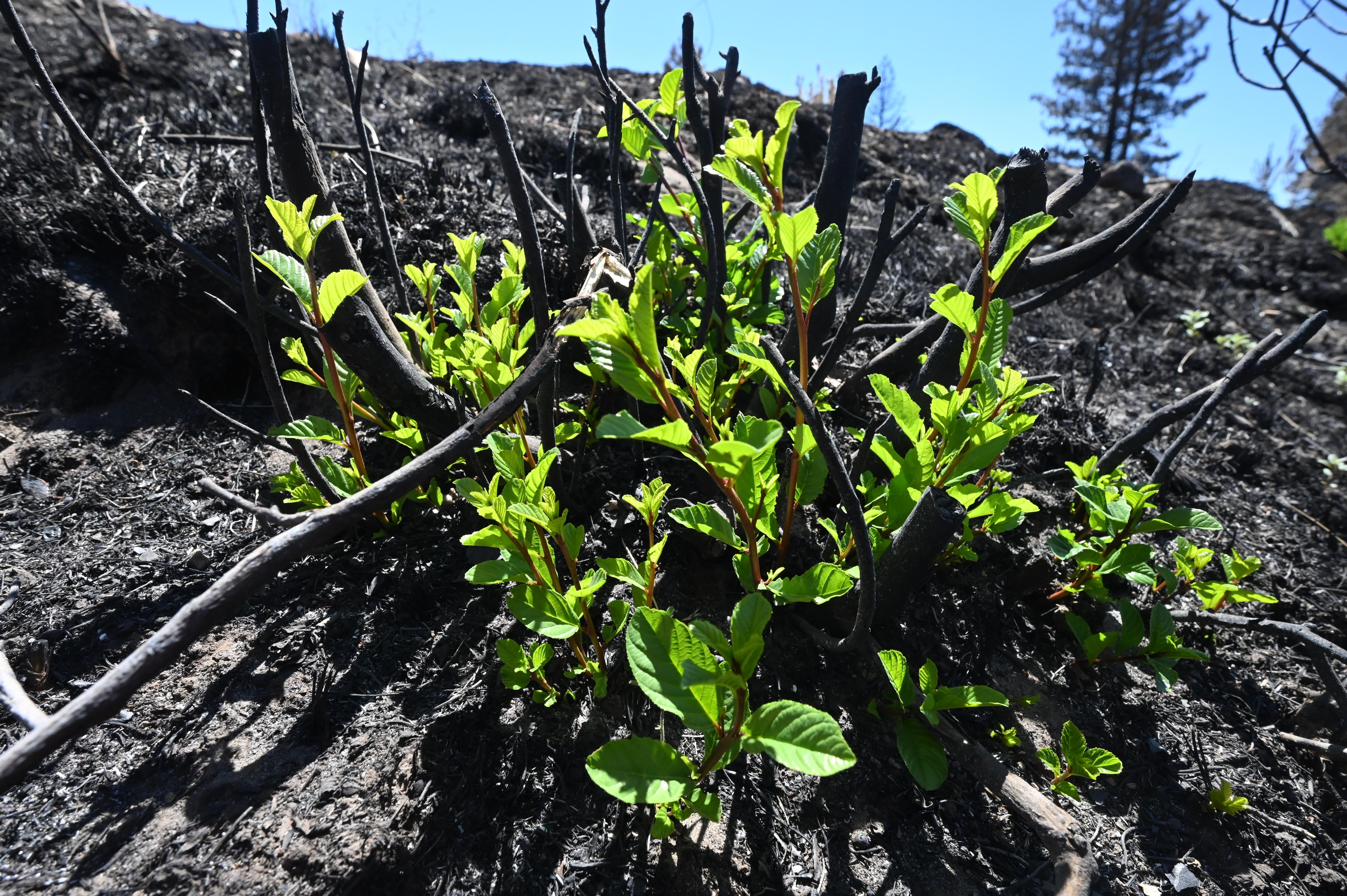
Vegetation growing back in the burn zone on July 28, 2021

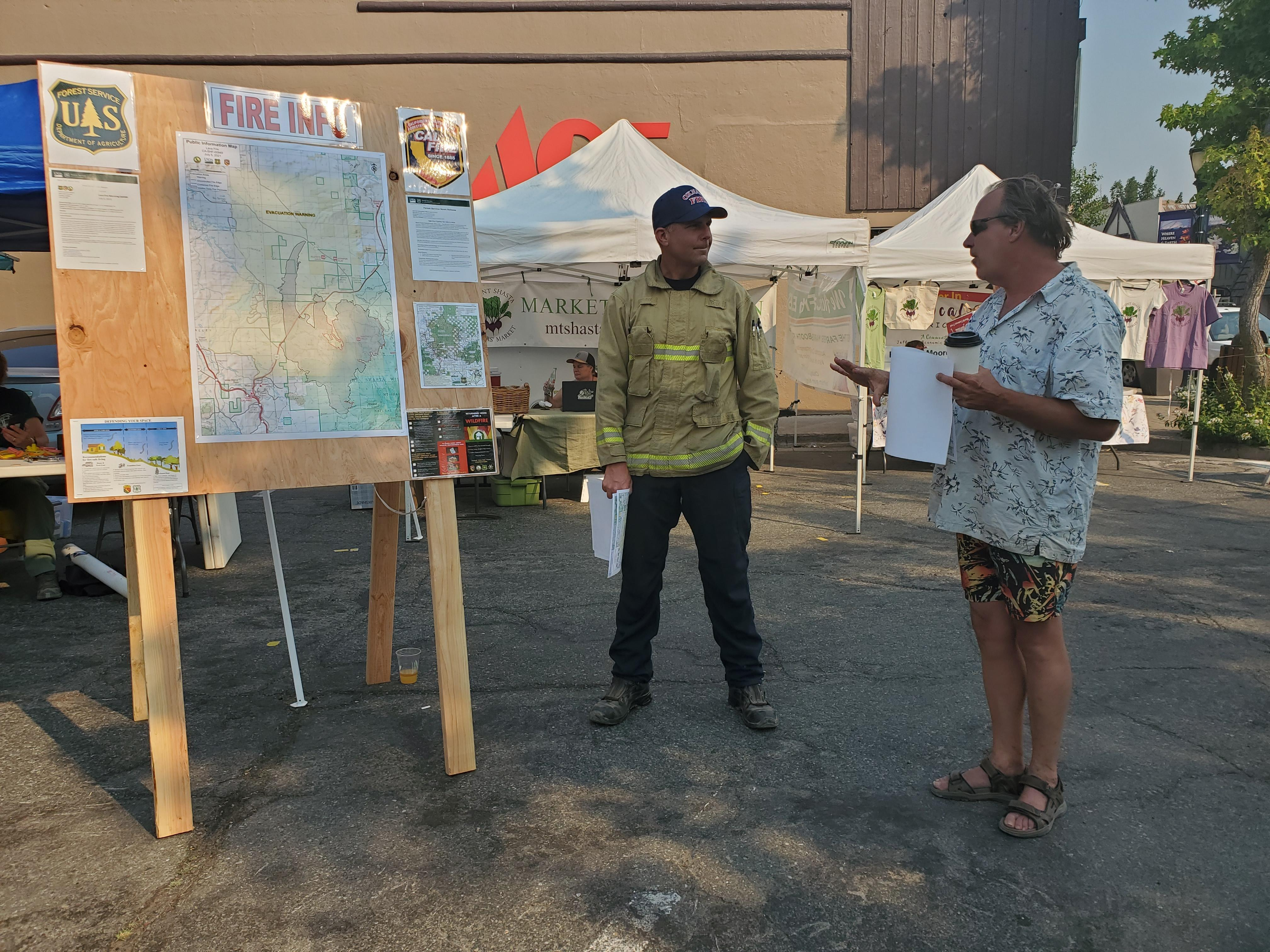
Firefighter talks with community members at the Mount Shasta Farmer's Market on July 30, 2021

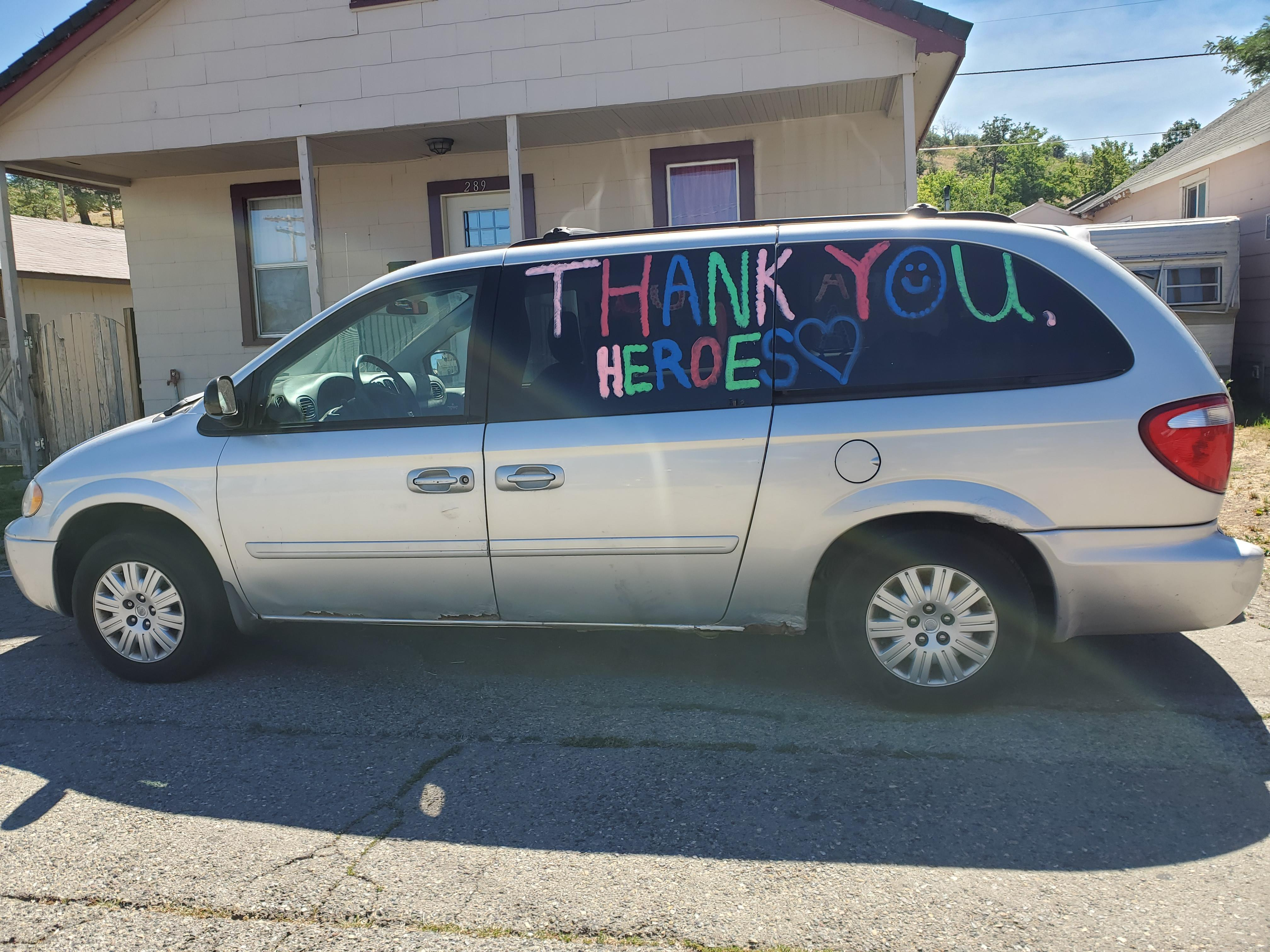
Thank you sign on a vehicle on July 30, 2021

== See also ==
- 2021 California wildfires
