= 2022–23 European windstorm season =

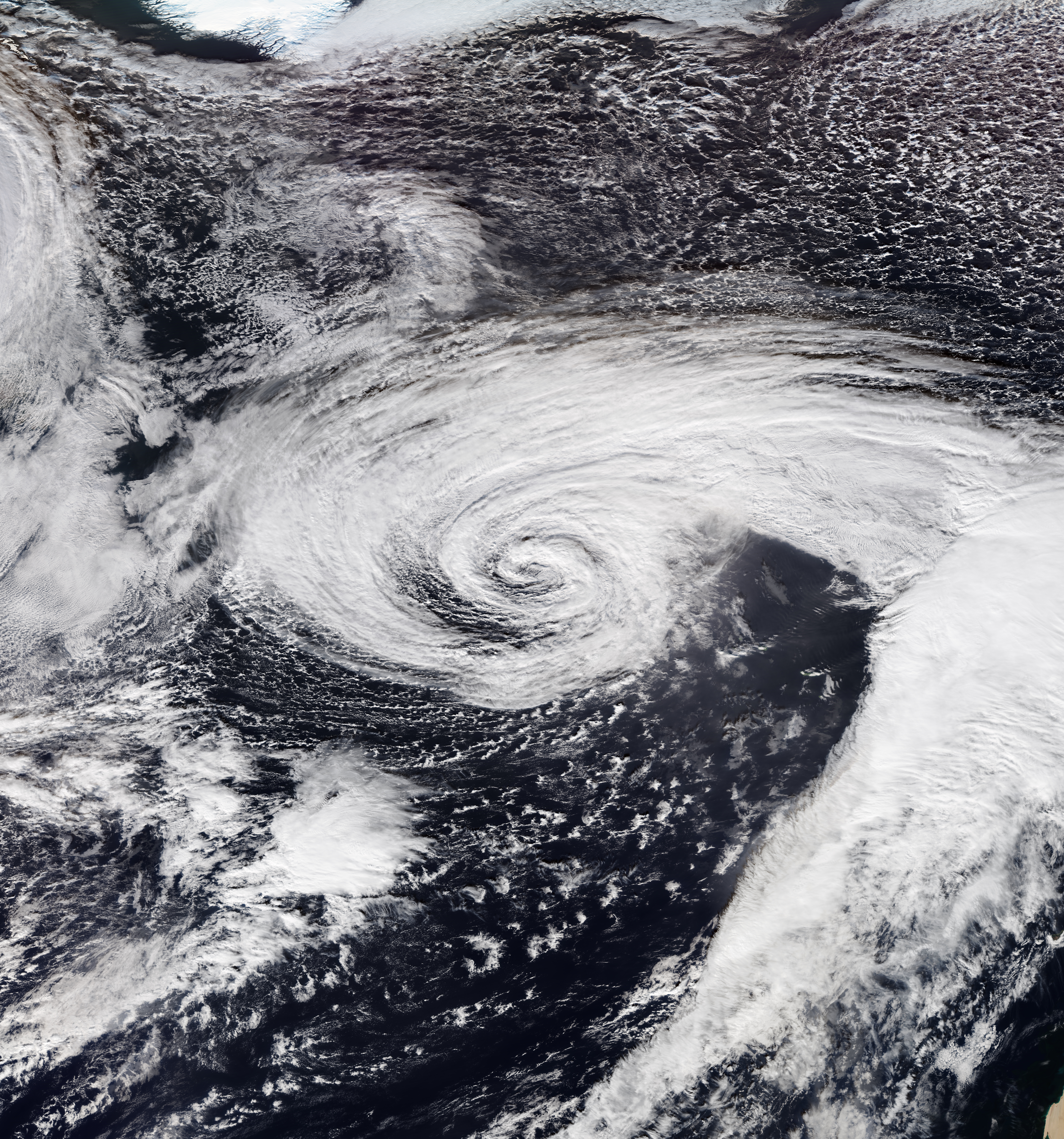
- Storm Efrain, the most intense storm of the season.
- First storm formed: 8 September 2022
- Last storm dissipated: 27 September 2023
- Strongest storm^{1}: Storm Efrain 955 hPa (28.20 inHg)
- Strongest wind gust: Storm Otto 225 km/h (140 mph): Cairngorm Summit
- Total storms: 45
- Total damage: ~€30.000 billion (£25.000 billion) (Costliest European windstorm season on record)
- Total fatalities: 6,000+ confirmed, 18,000-20,000+ estimated ≥10,000 missing (Deadliest European windstorm season on record)
- ^{1}Strongest storm is determined by lowest pressure and maximum recorded non-mountainous wind gust is also included for reference.

The 2022–23 European windstorm season was the deadliest and costliest European windstorm season on record, mainly because of the impact in northern Libya of Storm Daniel, which became the deadliest and costliest medicane ever recorded as well as the deadliest tropical or subtropical system worldwide since 2013.

The 2022–23 season was the eighth instance of the European windstorm naming in Europe. It comprised a year from 1 September to 31 August, except in the Eastern Mediterranean Group which is shifted a month later and as such Storm Daniel was named on 4 September and lasted until 12 September, and Storm Elias existed two weeks later and overlapped with the first storm of the succeeding season named by Greece. This was the fourth season where the Netherlands participated, alongside the United Kingdom's Met Office and Ireland's Met Éireann in the western group. The Portuguese, Spanish, French and Belgian meteorological agencies collaborated for the sixth time, joined by Luxembourg's agency (South-western group). This is the second season where Greece, Israel and Cyprus (Eastern Mediterranean group), and Italy, Slovenia, Croatia, Montenegro, North Macedonia and Malta (Central Mediterranean group) named storms which affected their areas.

== Background and naming ==
=== Definitions and naming conventions ===
There is no universal definition of what constitutes a windstorm in Europe, nor is there a universally accepted system of naming storms. For example, in the Western Group, consisting of the UK, Ireland, and the Netherlands, a storm is named if one of the meteorological agencies in those countries issues an orange warning (amber in the UK), which generally requires a likelihood of widespread sustained wind speeds greater than 65 km/h, or widespread wind gust speeds over 110 km/h. (Required wind speeds vary slightly by agency and by season.) Both the likelihood of impact and the potential severity of the system are considered when naming a storm. The Southwest Group of Spain, Portugal, and France share a similar storm-naming scheme, though their names differ from those used by the Western Group. In Greece, however, naming criteria were established for storms when the storm's forecasted winds are above 50 km/h over land, with the wind expected to have a significant impact to infrastructures. In Denmark, a windstorm must have an hourly average windspeed of at least 90 km/h (25 m/s).

The Meteorology Department of the Free University of Berlin (FUB) names all high and low pressure systems that affect Europe, though they do not assign names to any actual storms. A windstorm that is associated with one of these pressure systems will at times be recognized by the name assigned to the associated pressure system by the FUB. Named windstorms that have been recognized by a European meteorological agency are described in this article.

Naming conventions used in Europe are generally based on conditions that are forecast, not conditions that have actually occurred, as public awareness and preparedness are often cited as the main purpose of the naming schemes–for example, a reference. Therefore, an assignment of a storm name does not mean that a storm will actually develop.

=== Western Group (United Kingdom, Ireland and the Netherlands) ===
In 2015, the Met Office and Met Éireann announced a project to name storms as part of the "Name our Storms" project for windstorms and asked the public for suggestions. The meteorological offices produced a full list of names for 2015–2016 through 2017–2018, common to both the United Kingdom and Ireland, with the Netherlands taking part from 2019 onwards. Names in the United Kingdom will be based on the National Severe Weather Warning Service.

The following names were chosen for the 2022–23 season in the United Kingdom, Ireland, and the Netherlands. For a windstorm to be named, the United Kingdom's Met Office, Ireland's Met Eireann, and the Netherlands KNMI have to issue an amber weather warning, preferably for wind, but a storm can also be named for amber warnings of rain and snow (e.g. Storm Arwen in 2021).

- Antoni
- Betty
- Cillian (unused)
- Daisy (unused)
- Elliot (unused)
- Fleur (unused)
- Glen (unused)
- Hendrika (unused)
- Íde (unused)
- Johanna (unused)
- Khalid (unused)
- Loes (unused)
- Mark (unused)
- Nelly (unused)
- Owain (unused)
- Priya (unused)
- Ruadhán (unused)
- Sam (unused)
- Tobias (unused)
- Val (unused)
- Wouter (unused)

=== South-western Group (France, Spain, Portugal, Belgium and Luxembourg) ===
This was the sixth year in which the meteorological agencies of France, Spain and Portugal named storms that affected their areas.

- Armand
- Béatrice
- Cláudio
- Denise
- Efraín
- Fien
- Gérard
- Hannelore
- Isaack
- Juliette
- Kamiel
- Larisa
- Mathis
- Noa
- Oscar
- Patrícia
- Rafael (unused)
- Sarah (unused)
- Tiago (unused)
- Valerie (unused)
- Waid (unused)

=== Southeastern Mediterranean Group (Greece, Israel and Cyprus) ===
The following names were chosen for the 2022–23 season in Greece, Israel and Cyprus.

- Ariel
- Barbara
- Cleon (heatwave)
- Daniel
- Elias
- Fedra (unused)
- Guy (unused)
- Helena (unused)
- Ionas (unused)
- Jasmin (unused)
- Kyros (unused)
- Lahesis (unused)
- Moses (unused)
- Naias (unused)
- Orpheas (unused)
- Pnina (unused)
- Rigena (unused)
- Shmuel (unused)
- Talia (unused)
- Uranos (unused)
- Vered (unused)
- Xanthia (unused)
- Yonatan (unused)
- Zoe (unused)

=== Central Mediterranean Group (Italy, Slovenia, Croatia, Bosnia & Herzegovina, Montenegro, North Macedonia and Malta) ===
The following names were chosen for the 2022–23 season in Italy, Slovenia, Croatia, Bosnia & Herzegovina, Montenegro, North Macedonia and Malta.

- Ana
- Bogdan
- Clio
- Dino
- Eva
- Fobos
- Gaia
- Helios
- Ilina
- Leon
- Minerva
- Nino
- Olga
- Petar
- Rea
- Silvan (unused)
- Talia (unused)
- Ugo (unused)
- Vesta (unused)
- Zenon (unused)

=== Northern Group (Denmark, Norway and Sweden) ===
This naming group, like the naming from the Free University of Berlin, does not use a naming list but names storms when it has not received a name by any other meteorological service in Europe and is projected to affect Denmark, Norway or Sweden.

- Otto
- Hans

=== Central & Southern Group (Germany, Switzerland, Liechtenstein and Austria) ===
The Free University of Berlin names storms based on low pressures across the continent and does not use a naming list.

- Bettina
- Elke
- Marion
- Philomena
- Regina
- Poly

=== Ex-Atlantic Hurricane ===
One former Atlantic hurricane transitioned into a European windstorm and retained its name as assigned by the National Hurricane Center in Miami, Florida:

- Danielle

== Season summary ==
EUMETNET groups namings lists by colour

Western group
South-western group
Northern group
Central & southern group
Central Mediterranean group
North-east group
South-east group
Eastern Mediterranean group

All storms named by European meteorological organisations in their respective forecasting areas, as well as Atlantic hurricanes that transitioned into European windstorms and retained the name assigned by the National Hurricane Center:

== Storms ==
=== Ex-Hurricane Danielle ===
Ex-Hurricane Danielle
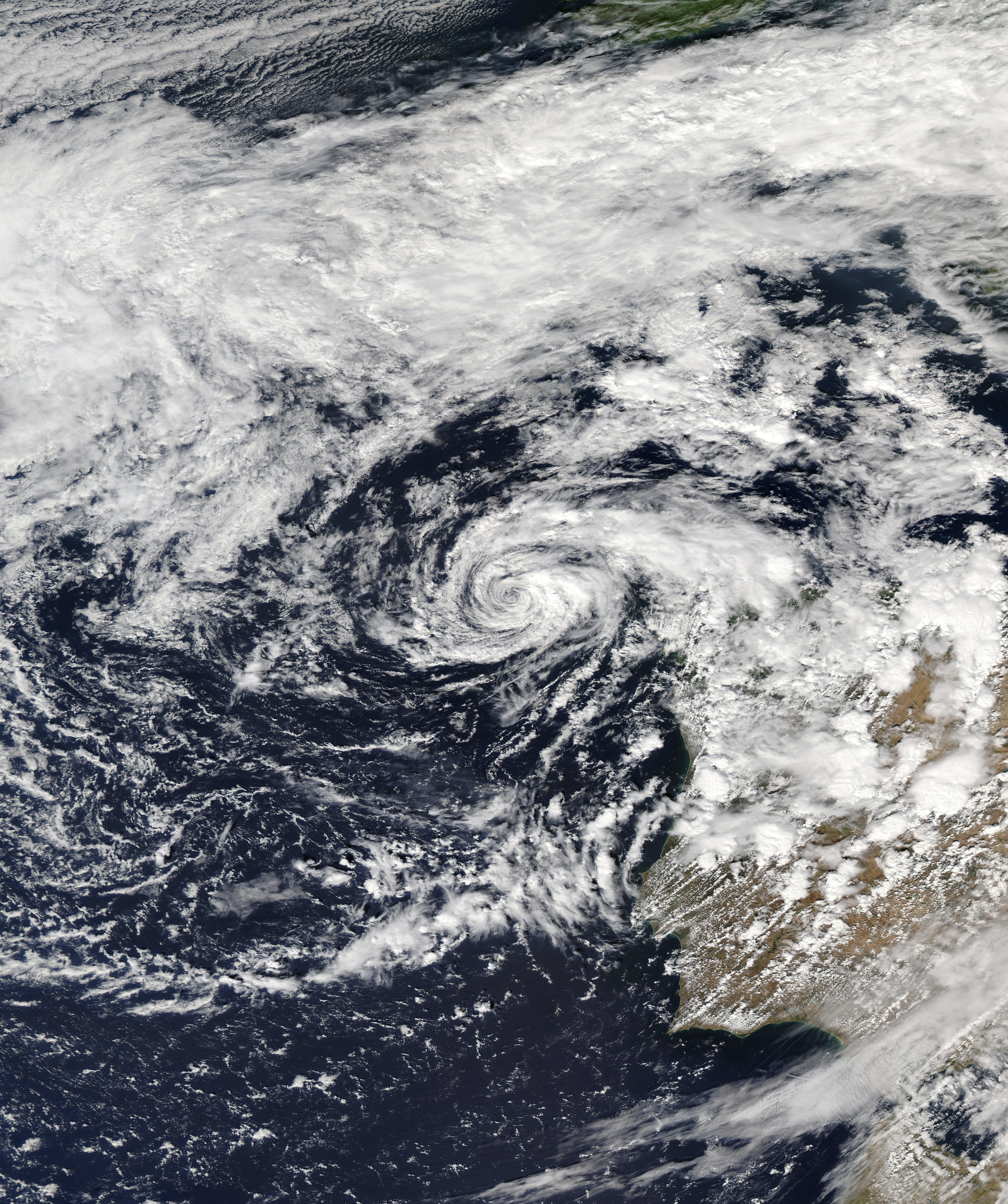
- Ex-Danielle off the coast of Portugal on 13 September

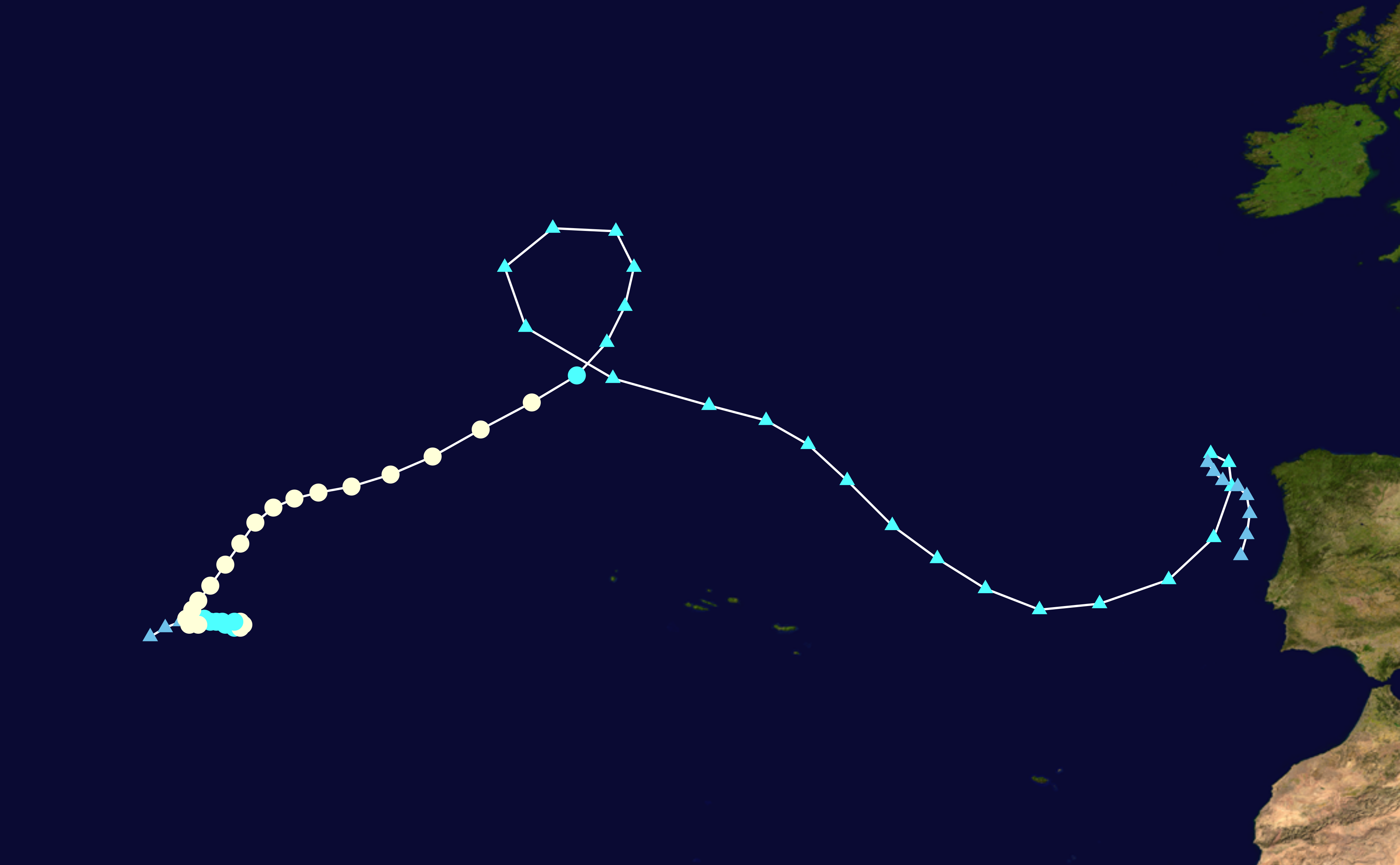
- Map plotting the storm's track and intensity, according to the Saffir-Simpson scale
- Area affected: Portugal, Western Spain
- Date of impact: 8–15 September 2022
- Maximum wind gust: 115 km/h (71 mph; 62 kn)
- Lowest pressure: 995 hPa (29.38 inHg)
- Fatalities: 0
- Power outages: Unspecified
- Damage: Unspecified

The remnants of Hurricane Danielle became an extratropical cyclone that affected Portugal and parts of western Spain. It had formerly been a Category 1 hurricane that transitioned into a post-tropical cyclone on 8 September, north of the Azores. It dissipated off the coast of Portugal on 15 September.

Large waves and heavy rainfall hit the Azores. Ex-Danielle brought heavy rain to mainland Portugal while meandering near its coast. Between 12 and 13 September, 644 accidents were reported throughout the country. While many downed trees and flash floods were reported, no fatalities resulted from the downpours. In Manteigas, under a "state of calamity" at the time, following intense summer forest fires in nearby areas of the Serra da Estrela mountain range, floods and landslides caused major damage. Four vehicles were dragged into the Zêzere River. Heavy rain extended to as far north as Braga. Covilhã saw 67.2 millimetres (2.65 in) of rain while Viseu saw 62 millimetres (2.4 in) of rain. Minor wind and flooding damage was reported in both Lisbon and Setúbal. Much of Spain was put on yellow alert as wind, rain and thunderstorms triggered by the cyclone moved inland.

=== Storm Ana (Reili) ===
Storm Ana
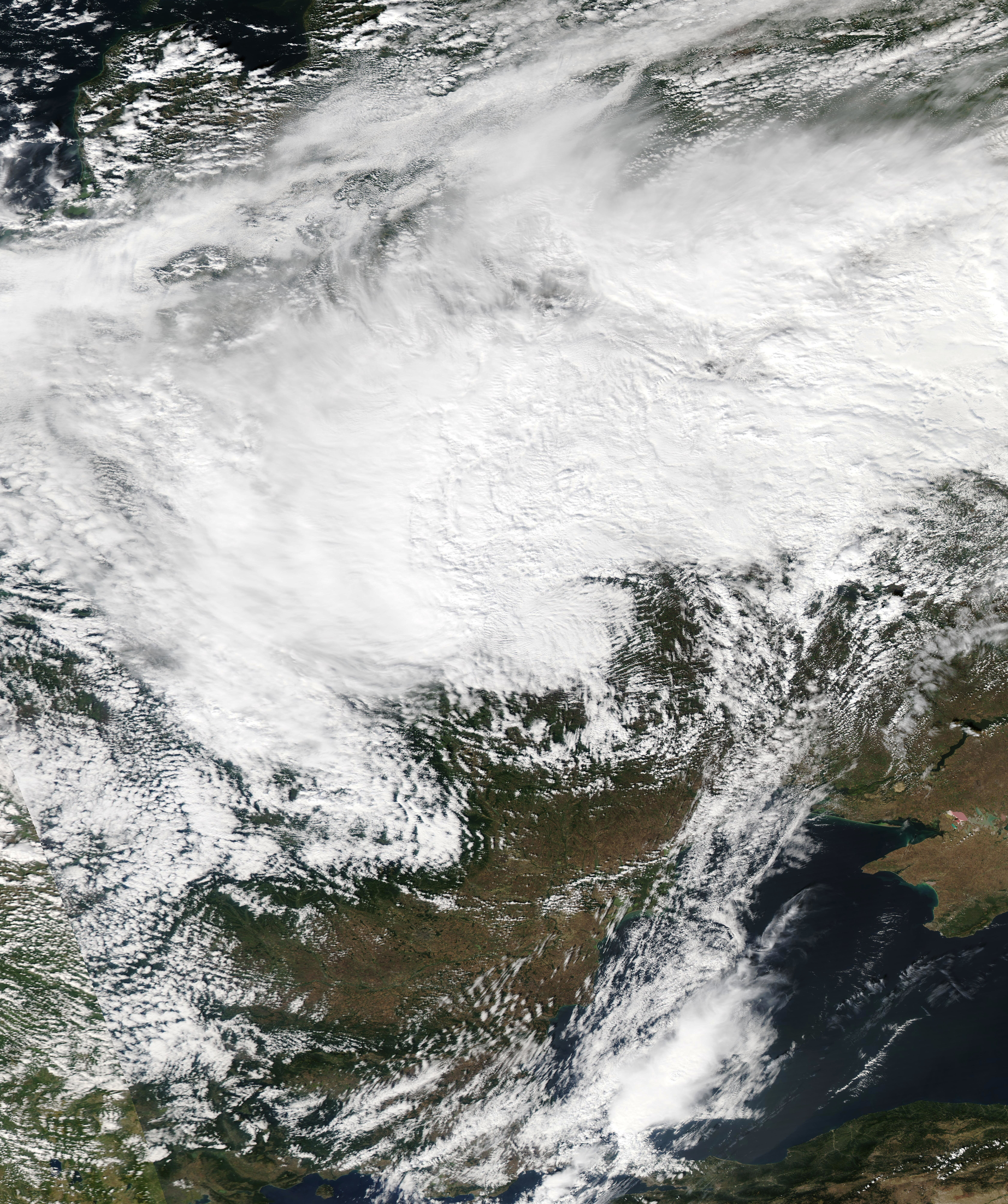
- Storm Ana on 18 September 2022

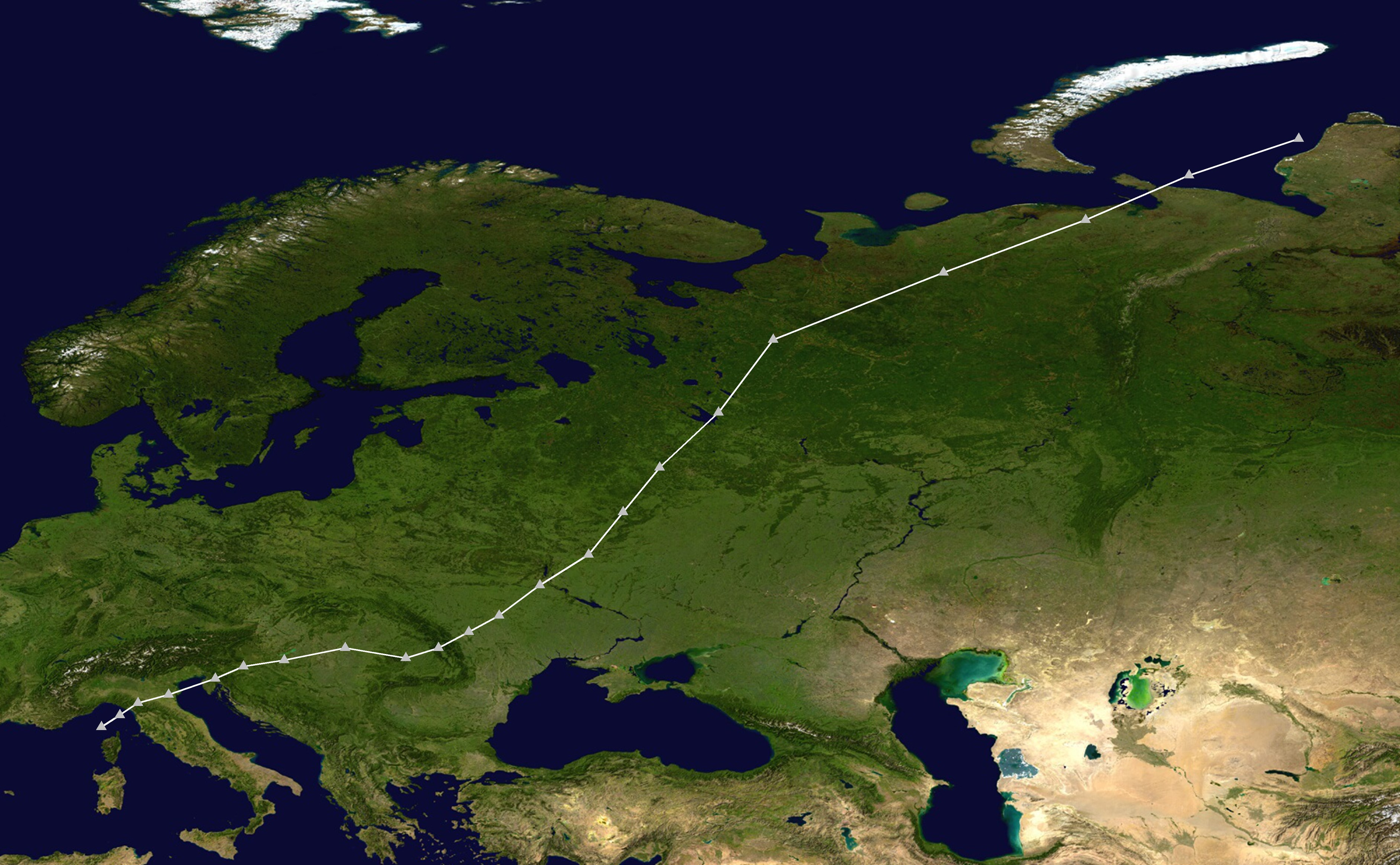
- Track of Storm Ana according to the University of Berlin
- Area affected: France, Italy, Slovenia, Croatia, Serbia, Hungary, Slovakia, Western Ukraine, Poland
- Date of impact: 15–21 September 2022
- Maximum wind gust: 175 km/h (109 mph)
- Fatalities: 12 dead, 50 injured, 1 missing (all in Italy)
- Damage: Flooding in the Marche region of Italy. Heavy rain in the Balkans.

Storm Ana was named on 15 September by the Italian Meteorological Service, with the same storm receiving the name Reili from the Free University of Berlin. The storm caused devastating floods in the Italian region of Marche between 15 and 16 September, mainly affecting the city of Ancona, where 12 people were killed and in other areas, 50 people were injured. One person is still missing. Afterwards, the system weakened and dissipated on 21 September.

=== Storm Bogdan (Ute) ===
Storm Bogdan
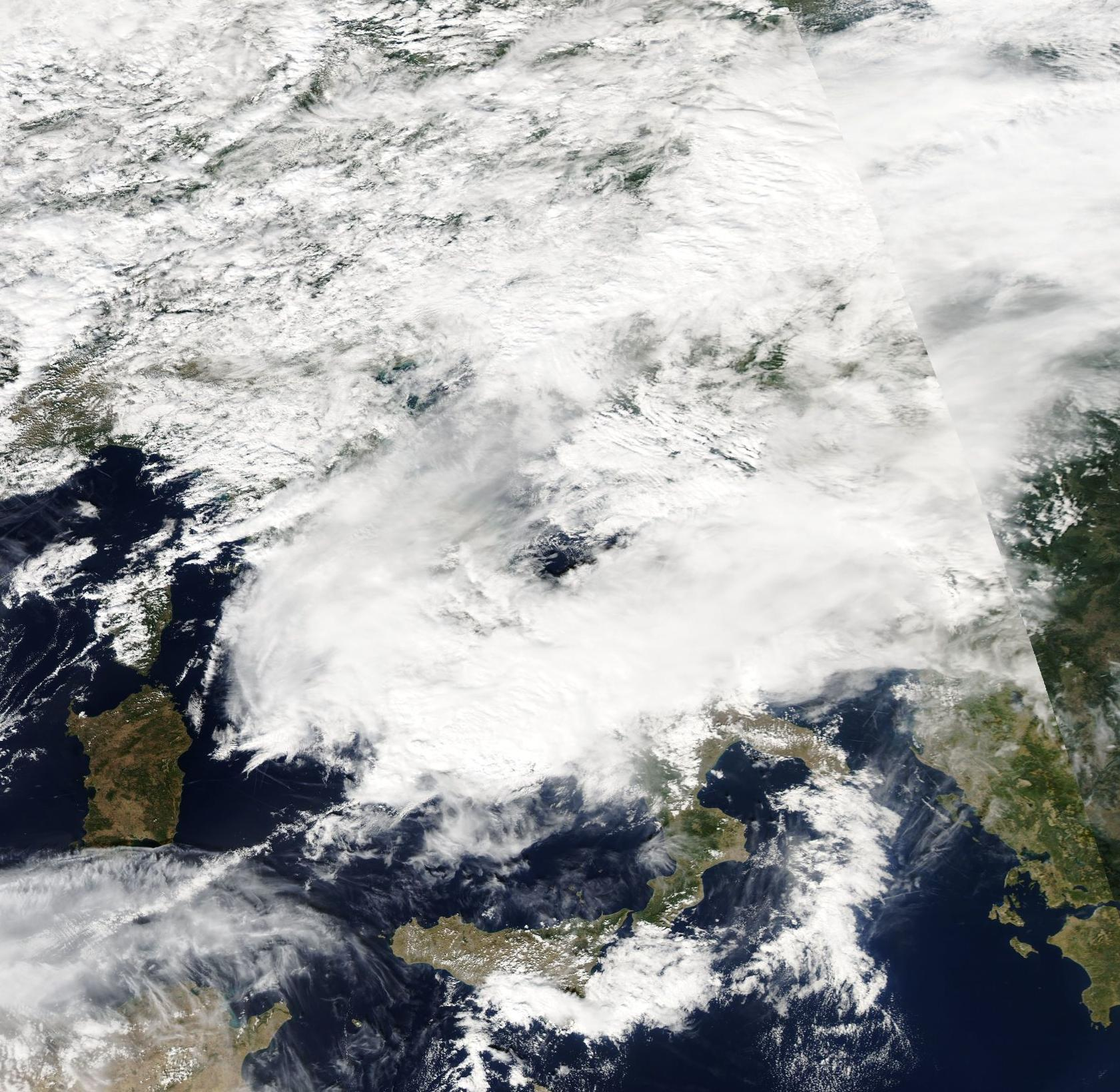
- Storm Bogdan on 25 September over Italy

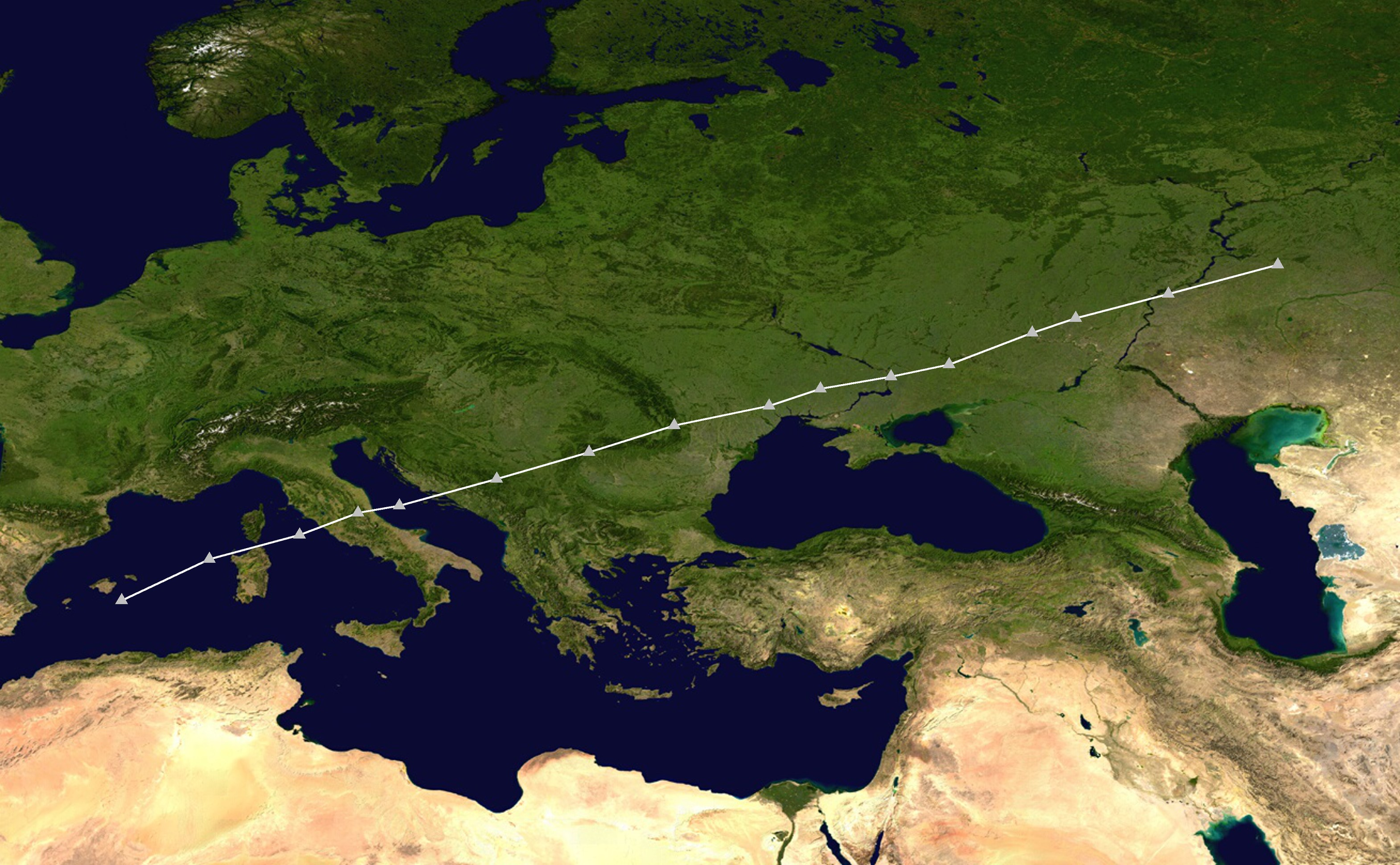
- Track of Storm Bodgan according the University of Berlin
- Area affected: Tunisia, Italy, Greece, Balkans, Corsica, Russia, Kazakhstan and Ukraine
- Date of impact: 24–29 September 2022
- Maximum wind gust: 165 km/h (103 mph; 89 kn)
- Fatalities: 0
- Damage: Unspecified

Storm Bogdan was named by the Italian Meteorological Service on 24 September. Greece's Hellenic National Meteorological Service issued weather warnings for parts of Western Greece and islands in the Ionian Sea.

=== Storm Clio ===
Storm Clio
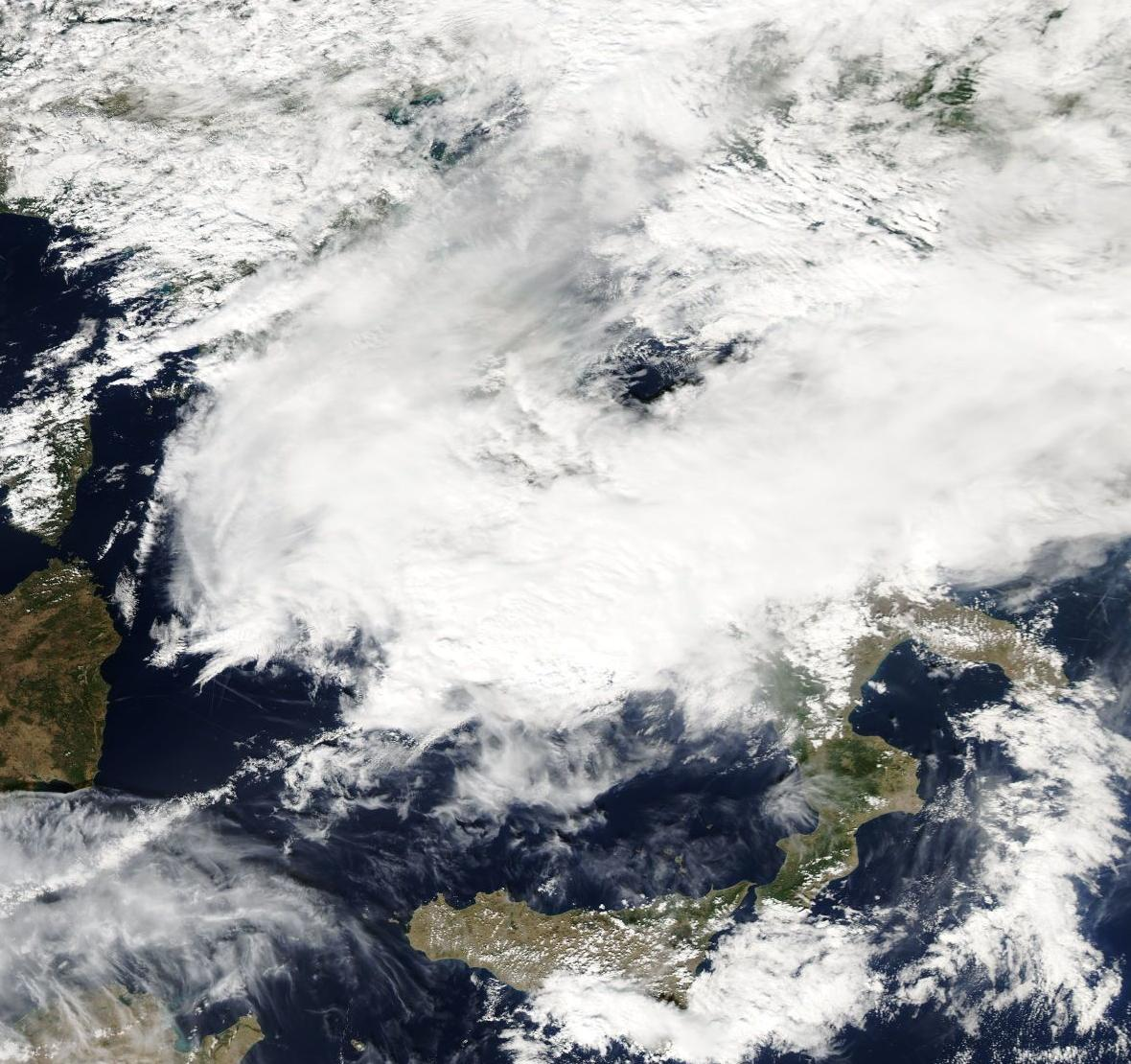
- Storm Clio on 25 September 2022

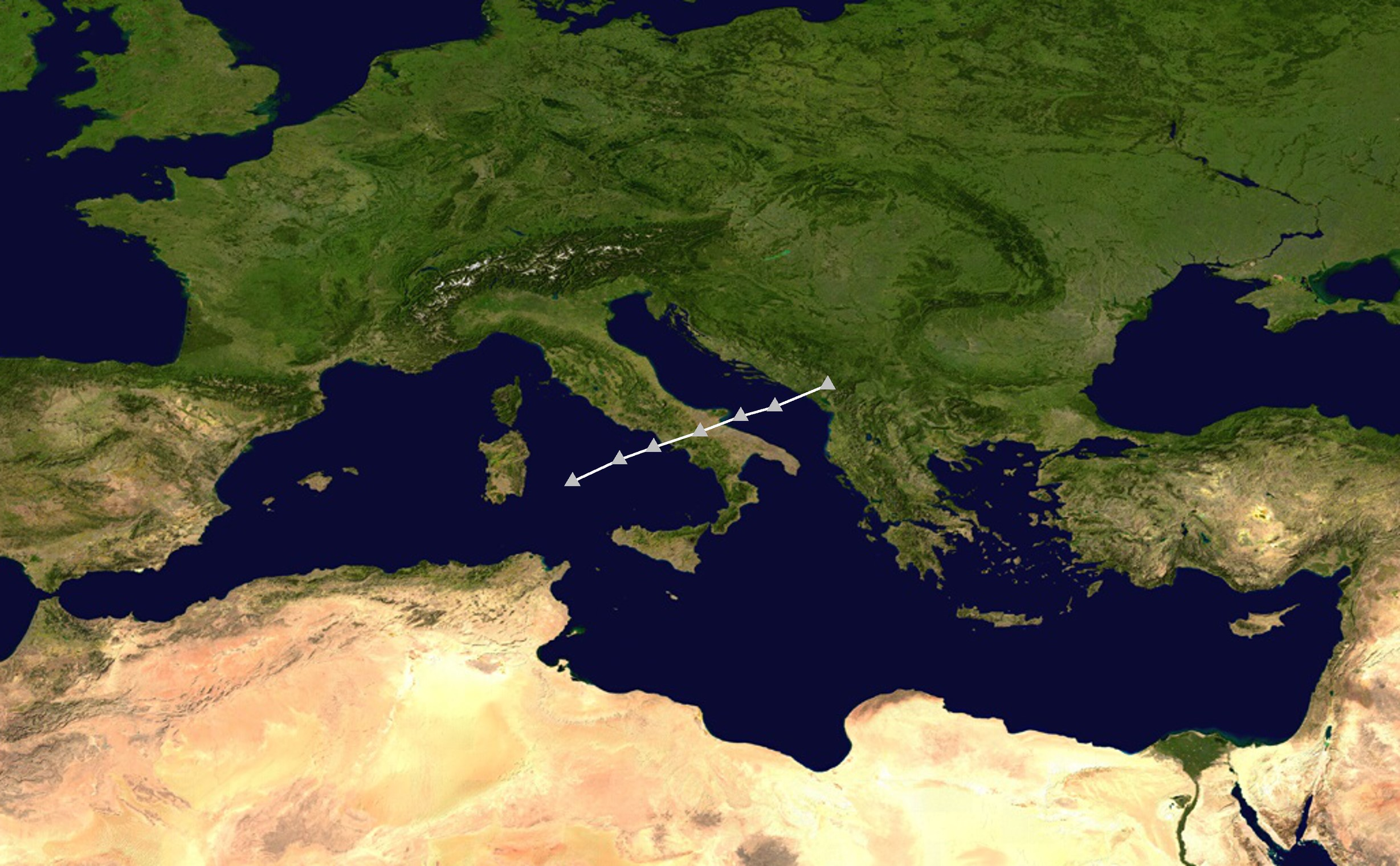
- Track of Storm Clio using data from the ESWD
- Area affected: Montenegro, Italy
- Date of impact: 25–26 September 2022
- Maximum wind gust: 155 km/h (96 mph)
- Fatalities: None
- Damage: Unspecified

On 25 September, Storm Clio was named by the Institute of Hydrometeorology and Seismology of Montenegro. The storm brought light rain and a moderate breeze to the country, however, the European Severe Storms Laboratory did not document any severe weather reports in Montenegro from Storm Clio.

=== Storm Dino ===
Storm Dino
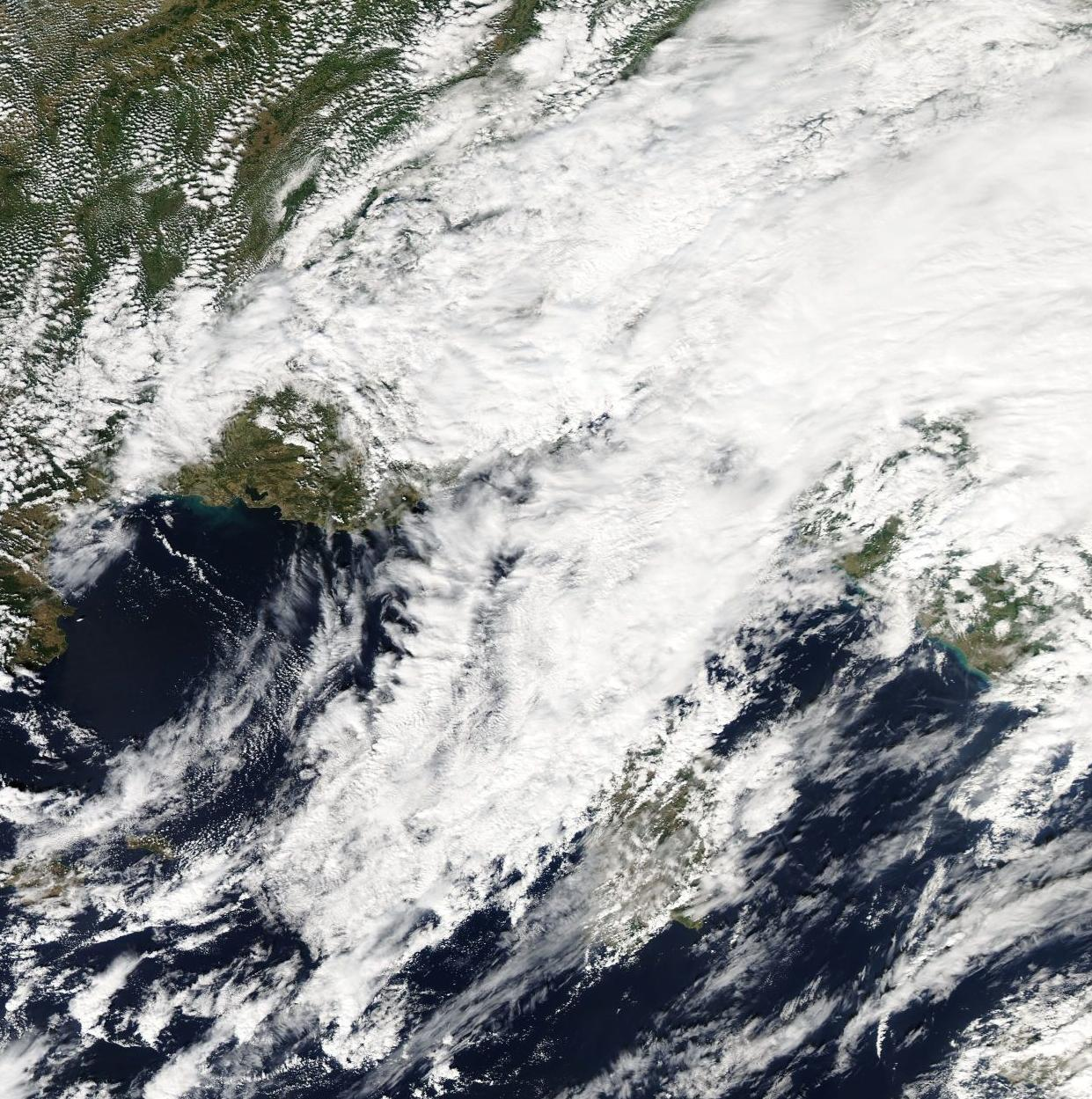
- Storm Dino on 1 October 2022

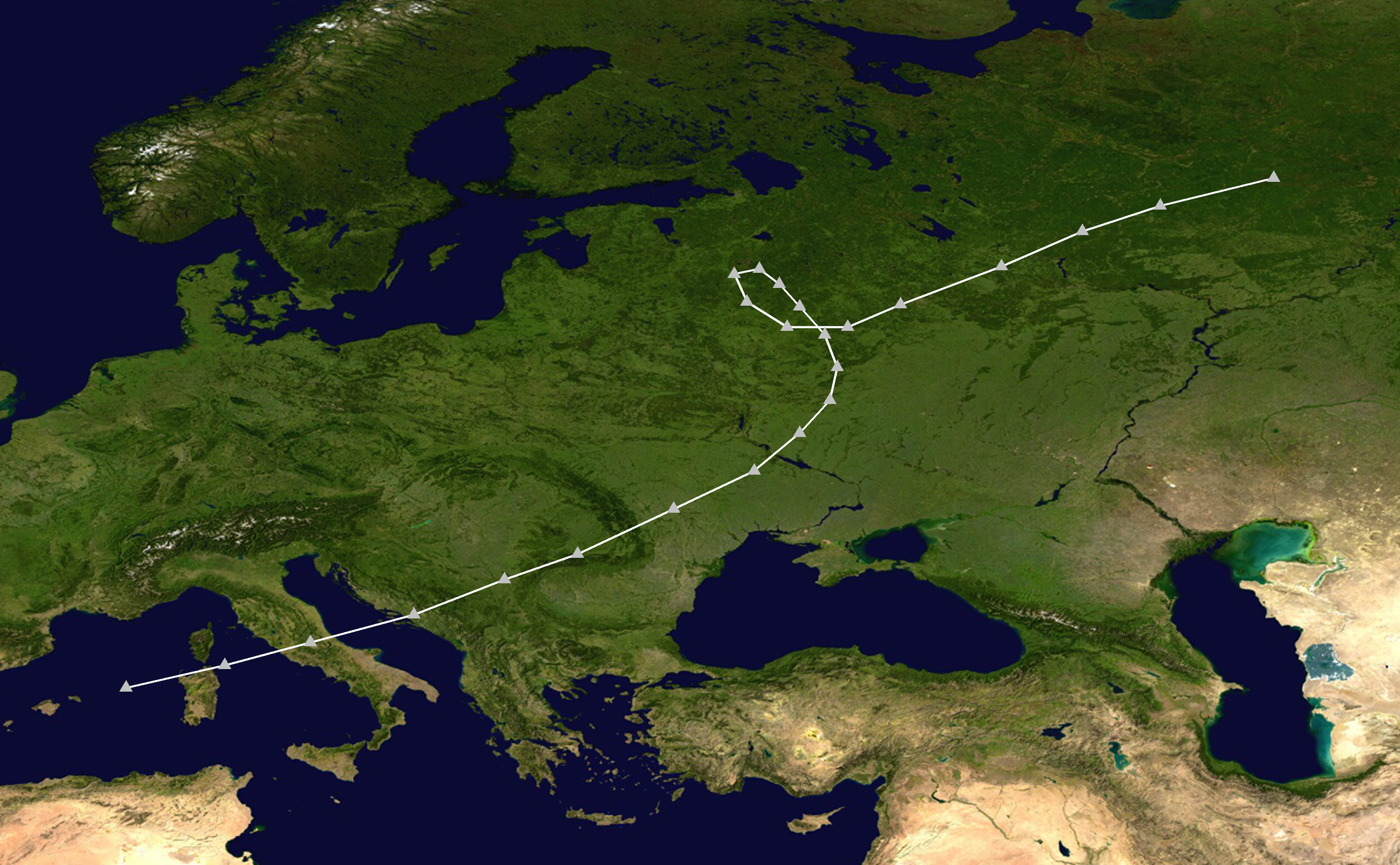
- Track of Storm Dino according to the FUB
- Area affected: Italy, Greece, Balkans, Eastern Europe
- Date of impact: 30 September – 6 October 2022
- Maximum wind gust: 120 km/h (75 mph; 65 kn)
- Fatalities: None
- Damage: Unspecified

Storm Dino was named by the Italian Meteorological Service on 30 September 2022, a gust of 84 miles per hour (135 km/h) was recorded. It later went on to affect Greece and brought winds of up to 85 kilometres per hour (53 mph). The storm dissipated on 6 October 2022.

=== Storm Bettina ===
Storm Bettina
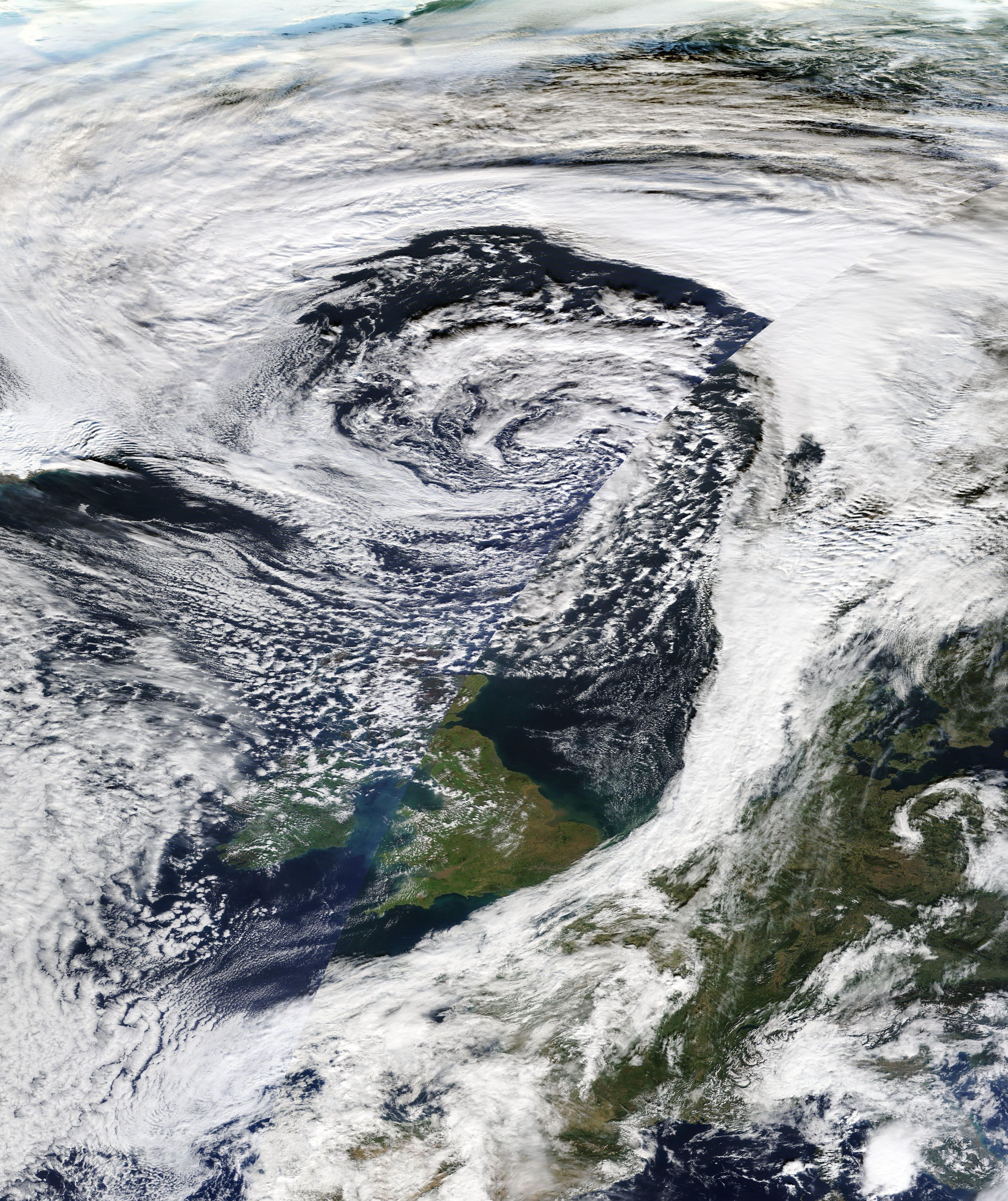
- Storm Bettina on 10 October 2022

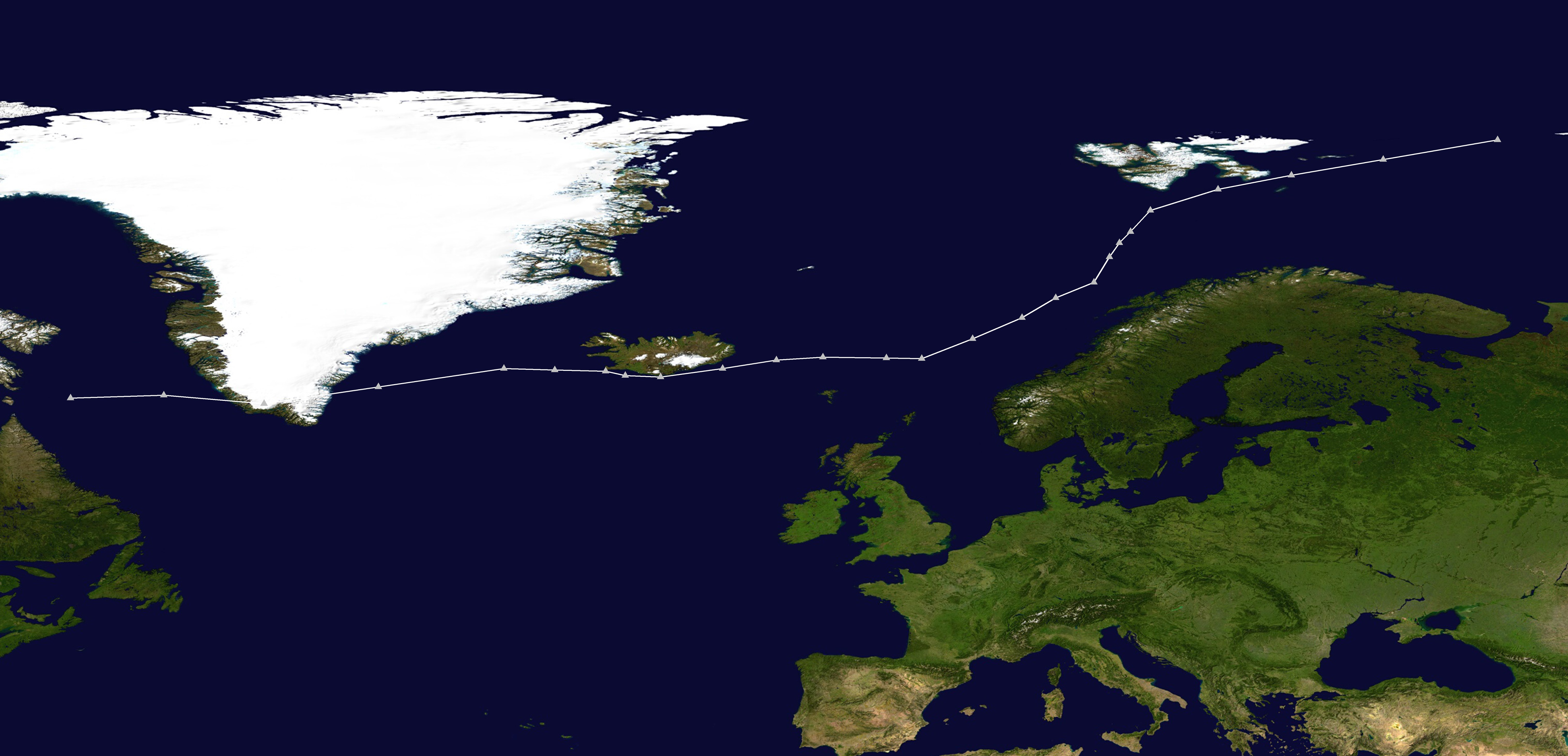
- Track of Storm Bettina according to the FUB
- Area affected: Iceland and Svalbard
- Date of impact: 7–13 October 2022
- Maximum wind gust: 49 m/s (175 km/h; 110 mph; 95 kn)
- Lowest pressure: 975 hPa (28.79 inHg)
- Fatalities: None
- Damage: Unspecified

Storm Bettina was named by the Deutscher Wetterdienst, the German meteorological agency, on 7 October 2022. As Storm Bettina impacted Iceland on 9–10 October, the European Severe Storms Laboratory reported 181 storm reports, with 156 of those being severe wind reports of at least 25 metres per second (56 mph) and 25 heavy snowfall reports. Due to the storm, about 500 of RARIK's customers lost power. Dozens of reports of power transmissions being damaged or destroyed occurred on 9 October all around Iceland along with multiple reports of roads becoming impassable.

=== Storm Elke ===
Storm Elke
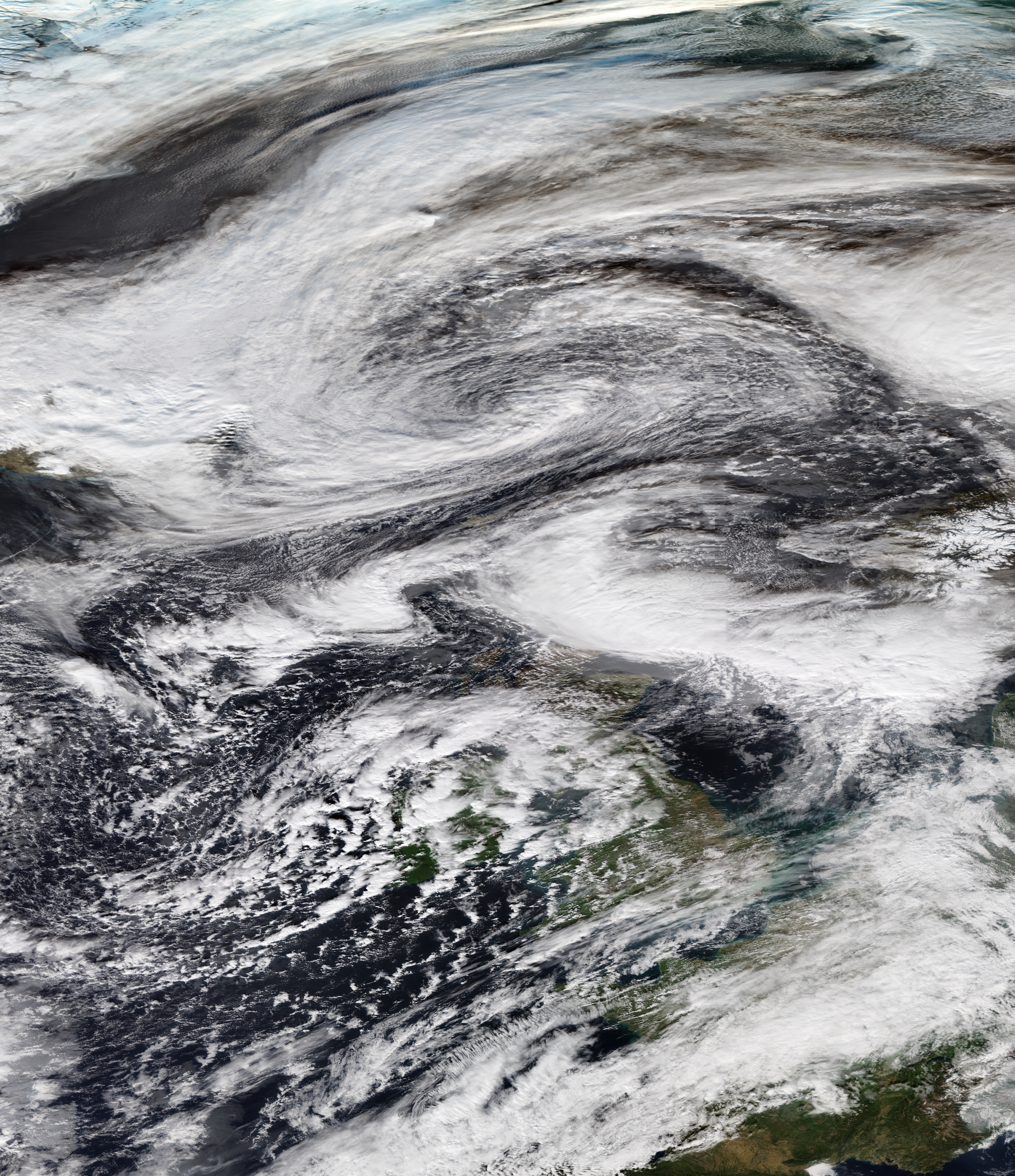
- Storm Elke at peak intensity on 15 October 2022

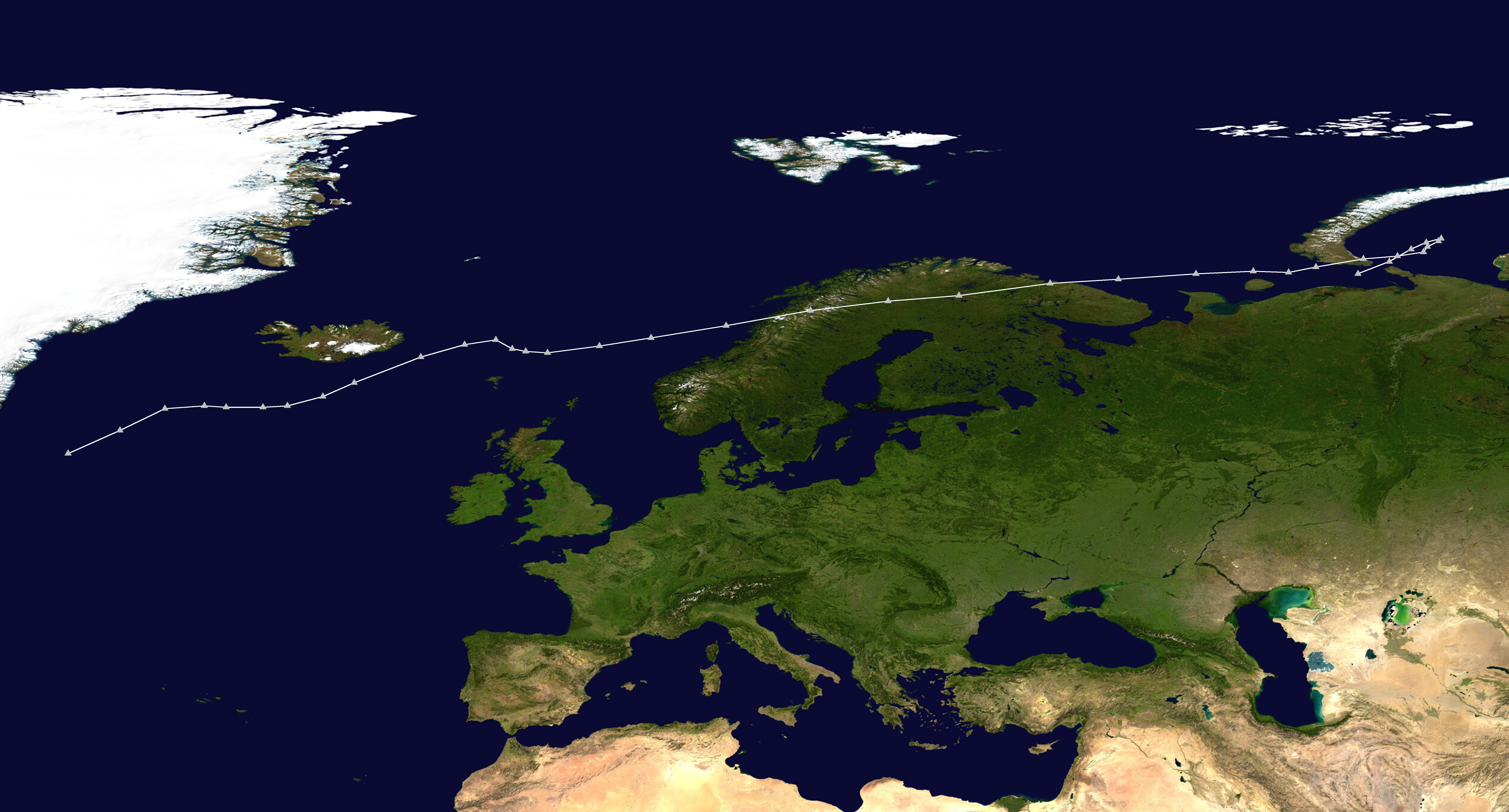
- Track of Storm Elke according to the FUB
- Area affected: United Kingdom, Norway, Sweden, Finland, Estonia, Russia
- Date of impact: 14–21 October 2022
- Maximum wind gust: 145 km/h (90 mph; 78 kn)
- Lowest pressure: 980 hPa (28.94 inHg)
- Fatalities: None
- Damage: Derecho in Scandinavia and tornadoes in Norway

Storm Elke was named by the Deutscher Wetterdienst, the German meteorological agency, on 14 October 2022. The storm impacted Norway, Denmark, Sweden, Estonia and Russia on 16–17 October, uprooting trees, damaging houses, and causing power outages. On 16 October two IF1 tornadoes caused damage in Norway. The event was later classified as a derecho imbedded in Low Pressure System Elke instead of a European Windstorm by the European Severe Storms Laboratory. The storm entered the Arctic and dissipated on 21 October.

=== Storm Armand (Georgina) ===
Storm Armand
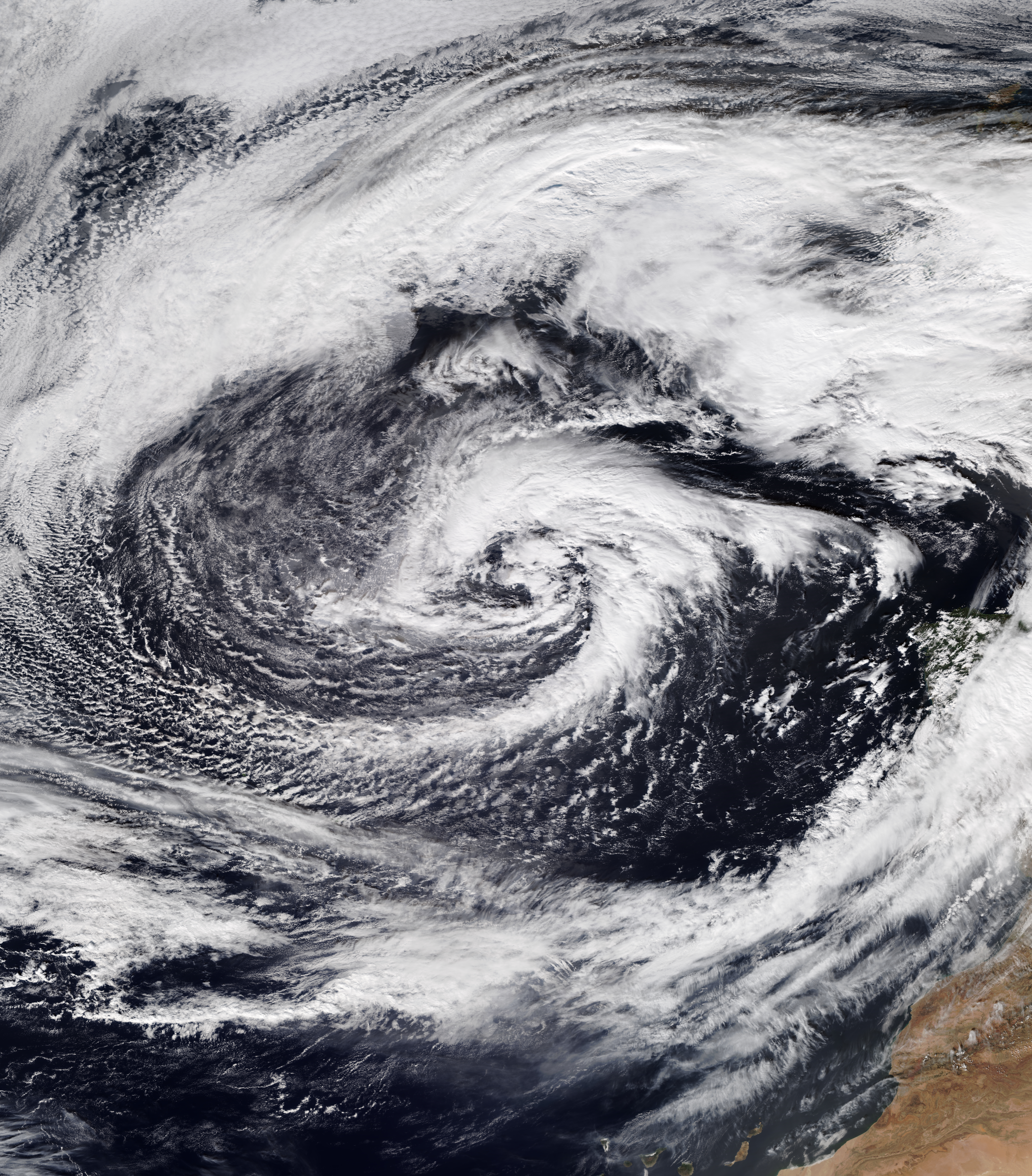
- Storm Armand on 20 October 2022

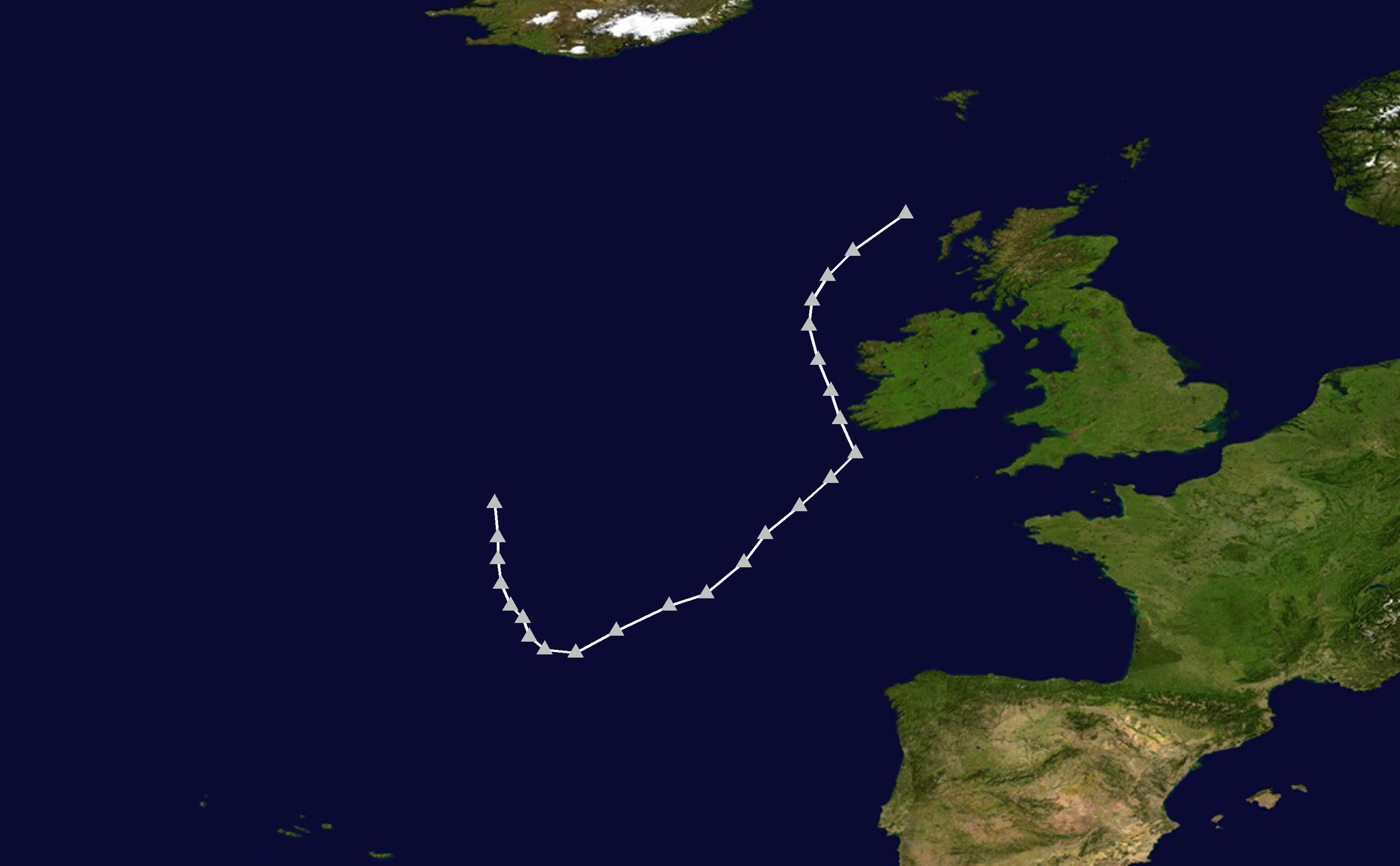
- Track of Storm Armand according to the FUB
- Area affected: Portugal, France, British Isles, Spain, Ireland
- Date of impact: 19–23 October 2022
- Maximum wind gust: 133 km/h (83 mph)
- Lowest pressure: 980 hPa (28.94 inHg)
- Fatalities: None
- Damage: Unspecified

Storm Armand was named by the Portuguese Institute of the Sea and Atmosphere (IPMA) on 19 October. This system was named Georgina by the FUB. Expected to bring strong winds to the Iberian Peninsula, Armand also caused flooding and fallen trees. On 21 October, the storm approached France and the British Isles, causing strong gales and heavy rain. By 22 October, the storm had reached the tip of Scotland after significantly weakening. The storm then entered the North Sea and then looped back around again to Ireland when it dissipated on 23 October 2022.

The strongest high-level wind gusts from Armand were recorded on Mount Aigoual, France, reaching 133 km/h (83 mph). Meanwhile, the strongest low-level wind gust from Armand was 100 km/h (62 mph) recorded at Brignogan, France.

=== Storm Béatrice (Helgard II) ===
Storm Beatrice
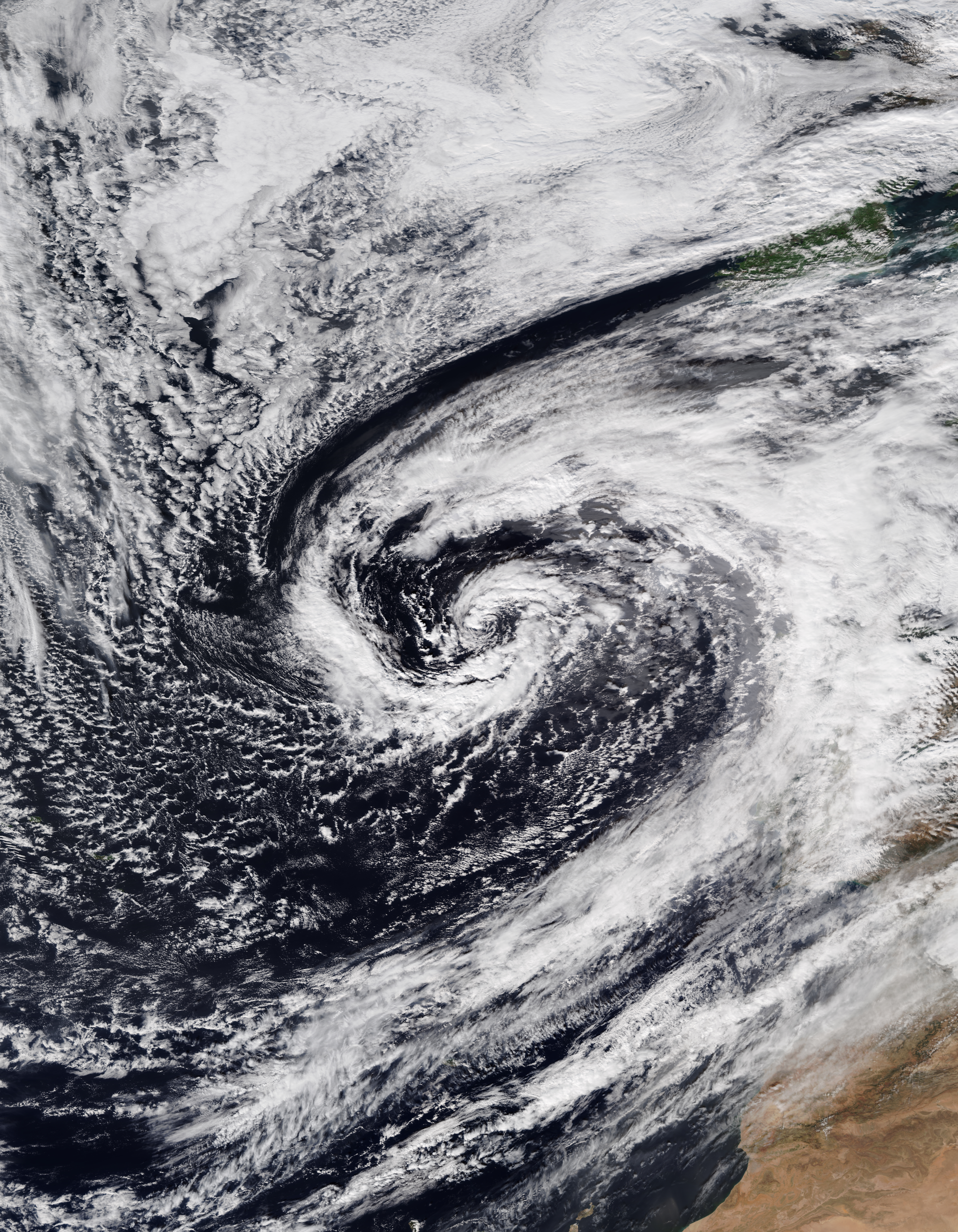
- Storm Beatrice on 22 October 2022

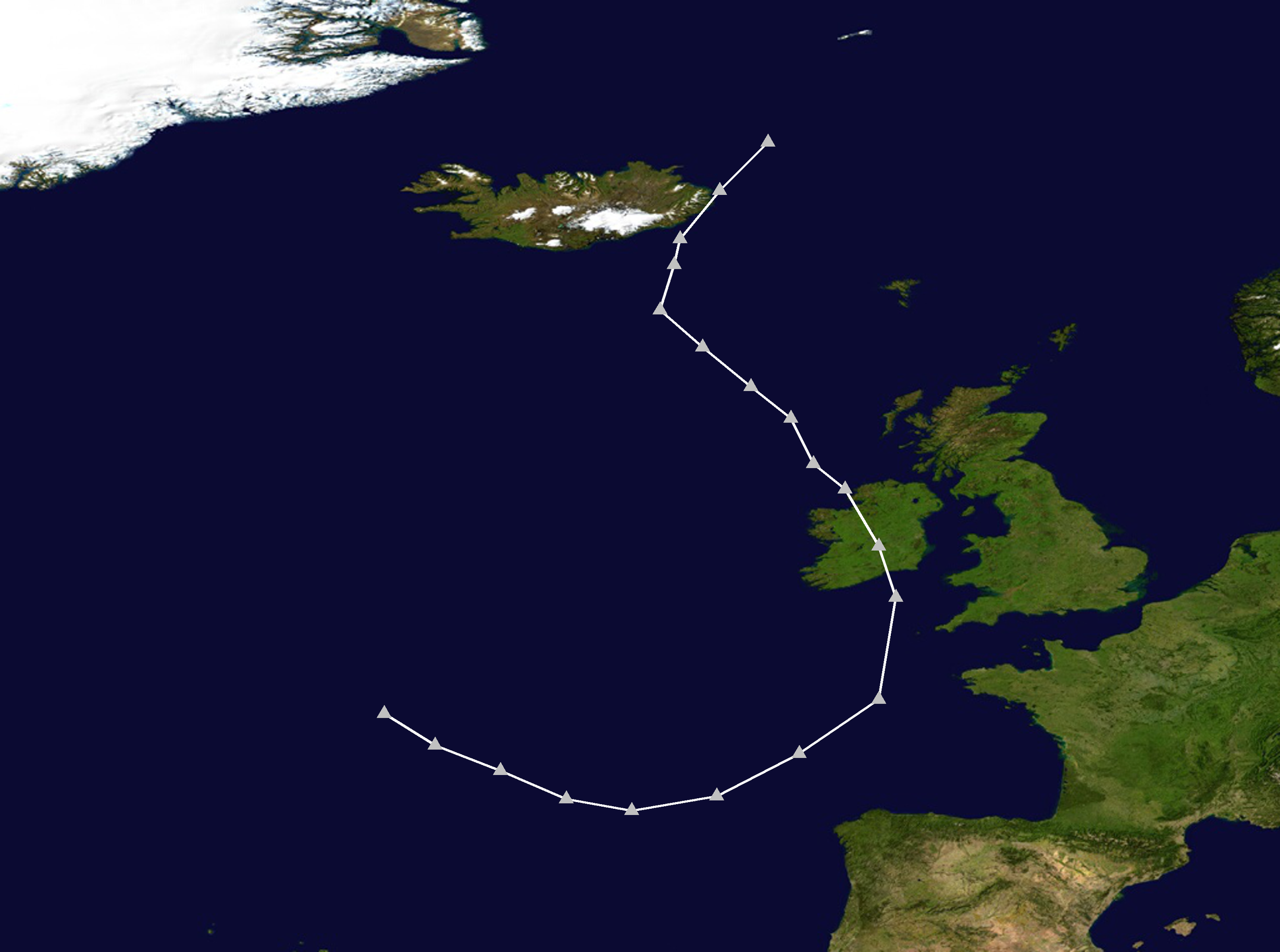
- Track of Storm Beatrice according to the FUB
- Area affected: Iceland, Iberia, France, Ireland and Britain
- Date of impact: 22–27 October 2022
- Maximum wind gust: 125 km/h (78 mph)
- Lowest pressure: 986 hPa (29.12 inHg)
- Fatalities: None
- Damage: Unspecified

A cold wave impulsed an extratropical cyclone in Europe and the storm interacted of anticyclone in the south in central Atlantic, the storm moved up towards Spain and Portugal, when on 22 October it received the name Beatrice. The system was named Helgard II by the FUB, and Helgard I went on into eastern Europe, as Helgard II did not affect eastern Europe. The storm then went on to bring heavy wind and rain to the Iberian Peninsula. The outer bands of this storm were also related to the supercells in northern France and southern England which produced at least nine tornadoes, including the intense Bihucourt tornado.

A band of intense thunderstorms on the northern leading edge of Beatrice crossed southern and eastern England during the afternoon and evening of 23 October, where a yellow weather warning for thunderstorms was issued. Heavy rainfall and strong winds were reported widely, resulting in some flooding and structural damage, and flights were disrupted at Heathrow Airport for several hours.

A small girl was injured by a disjointed gate in a severe wind gust, On 27 October, the storm tracked north towards Iceland and dissipated.

=== Storm Cláudio (Karsta) ===
Storm Cláudio
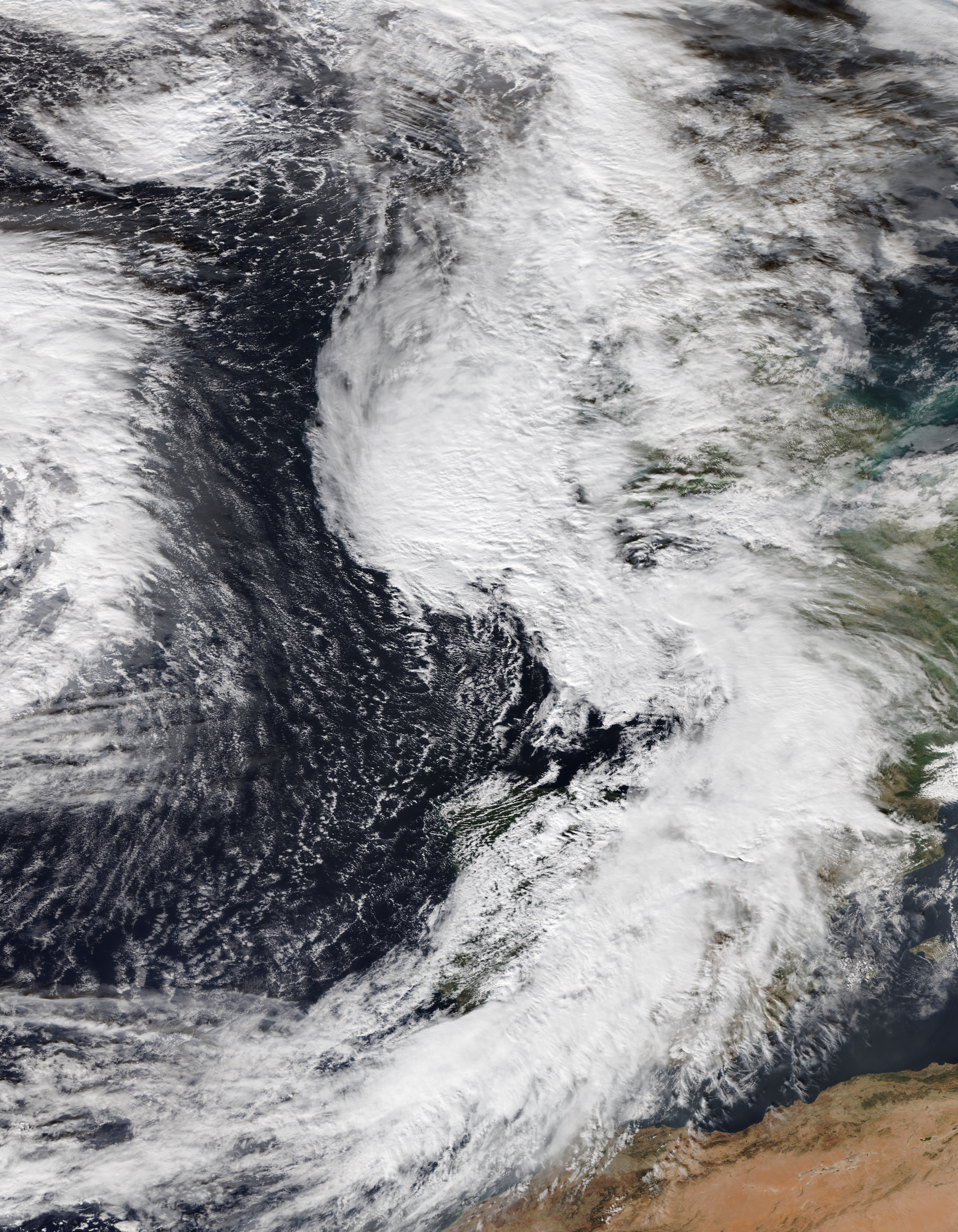
- Claudio on 31 October 2022 impacting western Europe and the Iberian peninsula

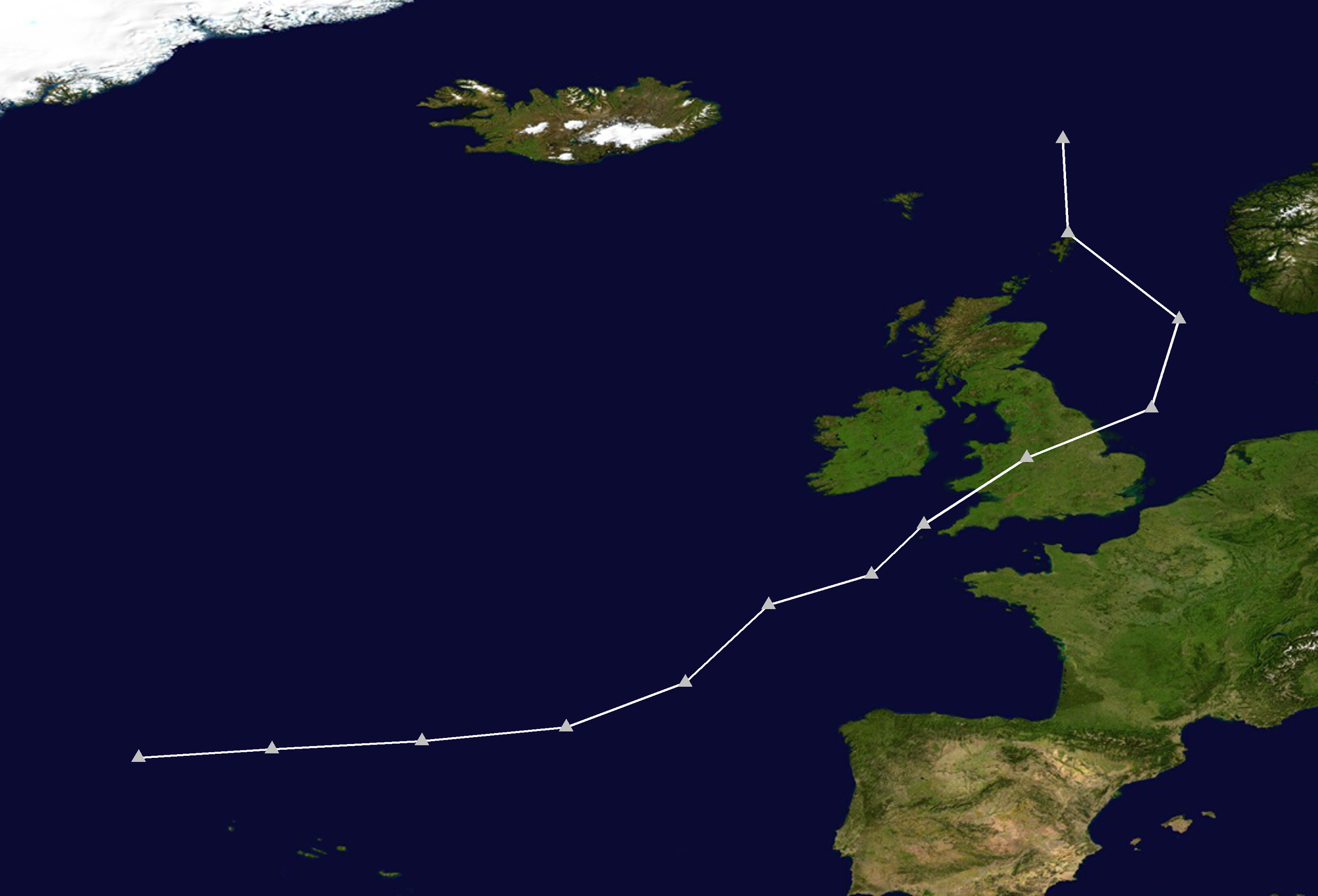
- Track of Storm Claudio according to the FUB
- Area affected: France, Spain, Ireland and Great Britain
- Date of impact: 30 October 2022 – 2 November 2022
- Maximum wind gust: 185 km/h (115 mph)
- Lowest pressure: 994 hPa (29.35 inHg)
- Fatalities: 1 (indirect)

Storm Cláudio was named on 31 October 2022. An orange alert for strong winds was put in place for four departments in northwest France. The Met Office issued a yellow weather warning for wind for most of the south coast of England, stretching from Weymouth to Kent. The Met Office had forecast gusts of 50–60 mph (80–97 km/h) with isolated gusts of >70 mph (110 km/h) on exposed coasts. The highest gust of 115 miles per hour (185 km/h) was recorded at The Needles on the Isle of Wight, with a 1-minute sustained wind recorded as high as 105 mph (169 km/h). A trampoline that was caught underneath a train meant that no trains could run from Worthing to Hove for more than three hours. High winds caused part of the southwest corner of the West Pier in Brighton to collapse into the sea. Two giant silver baubles were blown down by the storm and rolled down Tottenham Court Road in London. However, no damage or injuries was reported.

Storm Cláudio hit the UK as a deepening low-pressure system, the lowest onshore pressure of 994 hPa (29.35 inHg) was recorded in Plymouth at 22:00 on 31 October. The centre of the shortwave made landfall in Southern Wales, near Cardiff, at around midnight – with the storm further north than had initially been forecasted by both the Met Office and Météo-France. In the wake of Storm Cláudio heavy convective showers produced flash flooding and lightning across the Southwest of England on 1–2 November. At 13:23 on 1 November, a thunderstorm brought winds as strong as 84 mph (135 km/h) to exposed parts of Cornwall. In Devon, fire crews were called to a pre-school in Willand, Devon after a suspected lightning strike lead to a small fire at 14:40. Between the evening of the 31 October to the evening of the 2 November, more than 11,000 lightning strikes had been registered across the British Isles, with the majority of activity centred over the Channel Coasts.

Highest recorded wind gusts across the UK during Storm Cláudio from Met Office and National Coastwatch Institution stations
Location	Wind gust	Elevation above mean sea level	Time (local)
The Needles Old Battery, Totland, Isle of Wight	115 mph (185 km/h)	80 m (260 ft)	0:00 – 1 November 2022
Prawle Point, East Prawle, Devonshire	93 mph (150 km/h)	61 m (200 ft)	22:00 – 31 October 2022
Gwennap Head, Porthgwarra, Cornwall	93 mph (150 km/h)	66 m (217 ft)	20:00 – 31 October 2022
Isle of Portland, Weymouth, Dorset	86 mph (138 km/h)	52 m (171 ft)	0:00 – 1 November 2022
St. Catherine's Point, Puckaster, Isle of Wight	84 mph (135 km/h)	20 m (66 ft)	1:00 – 1 November 2022
Rame Head, Plymouth, Devonshire	81 mph (130 km/h)	105 m (344 ft)	22:00 – 31 October 2022

=== Storm Marion ===
Storm Marion
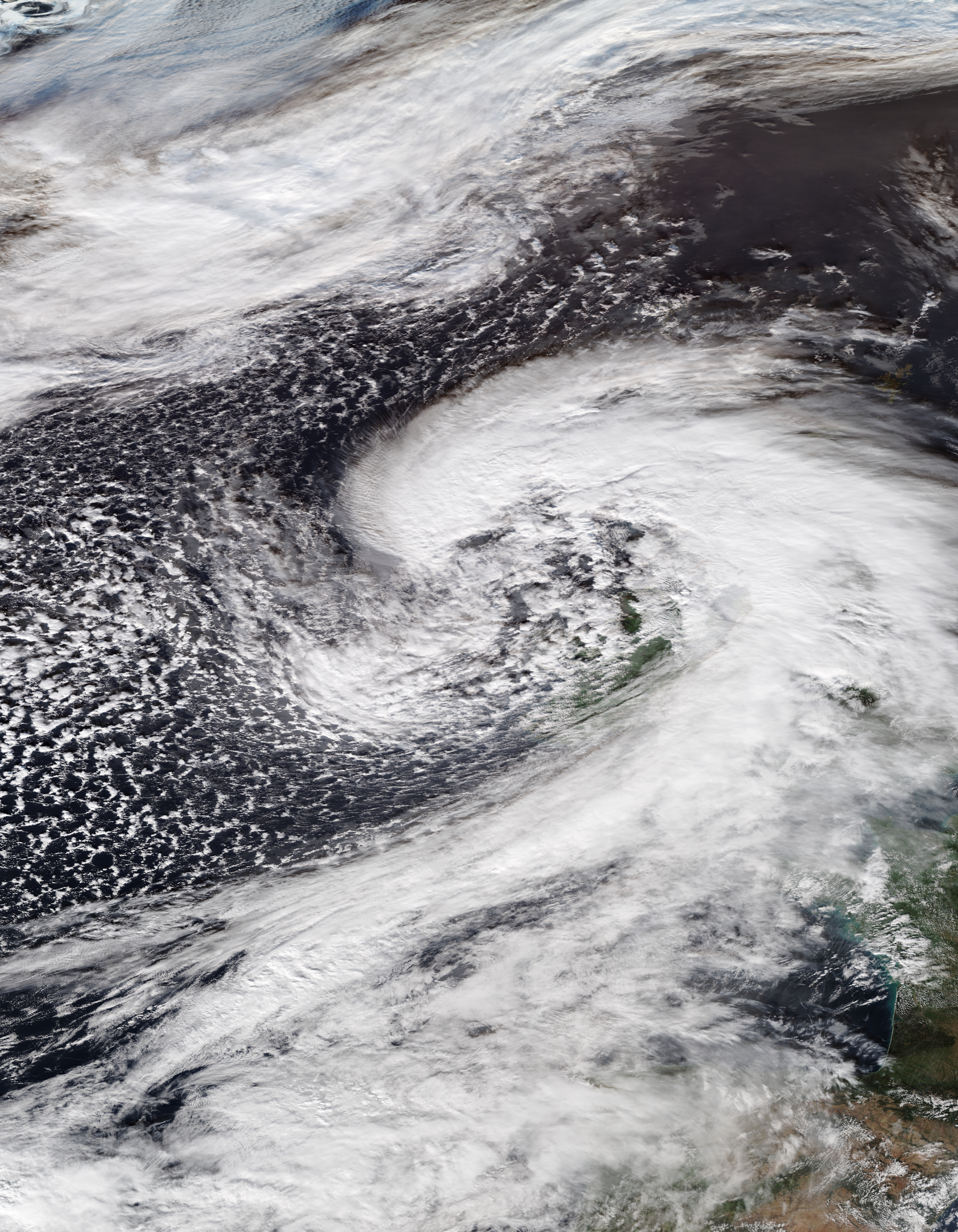
- Storm Marion approaching the British Isles on 2 November

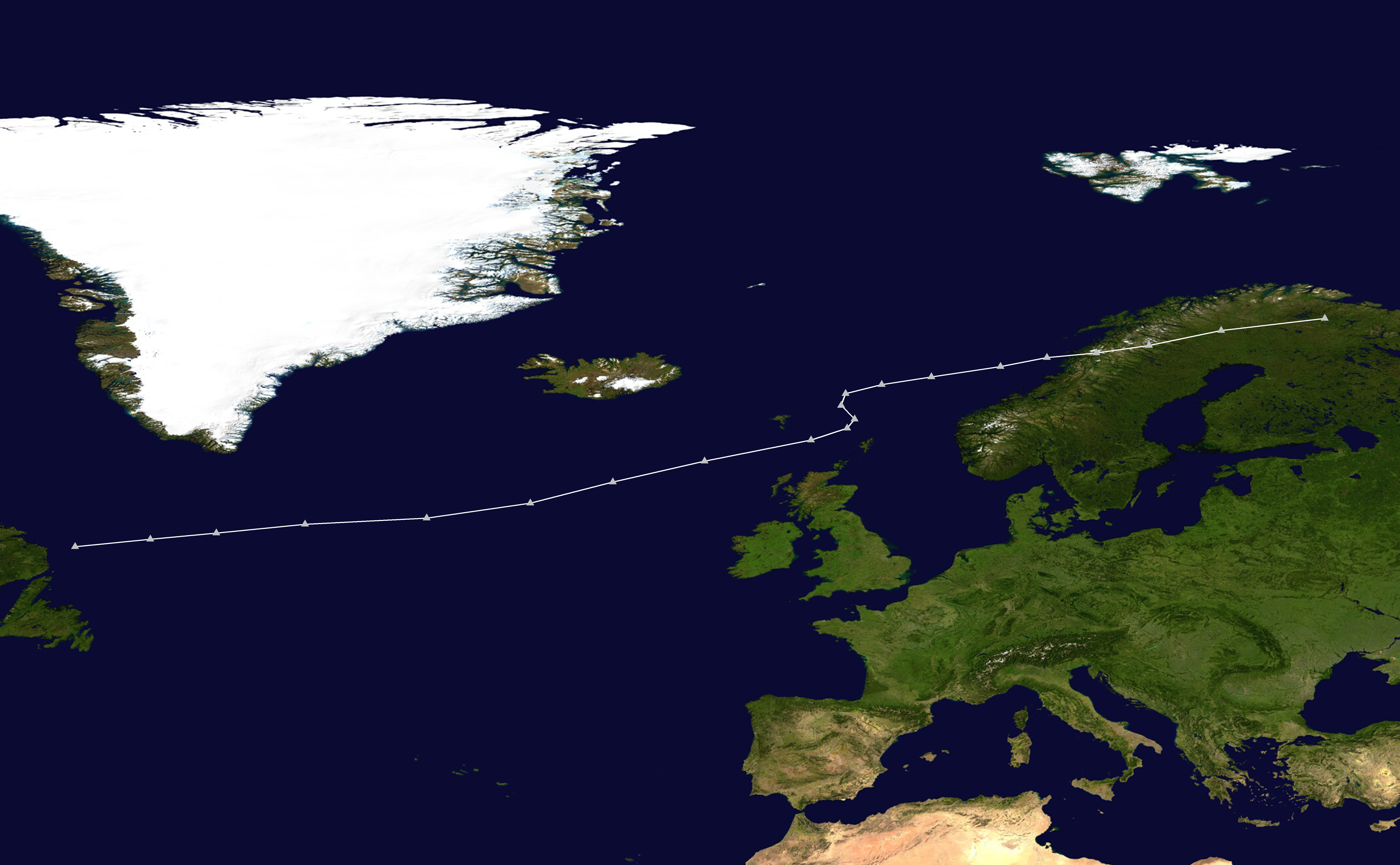
- Track of Storm Marion according to the FUB
- Area affected: British Isles, Norway, Iceland, Sweden, Finland, Russia
- Date of impact: 1 – 8 November
- Lowest pressure: 975 hPa (28.79 inHg)
- Fatalities: None
- Power outages: Unspecified
- Damage: Unspecified

A storm named Marion by the University of Berlin affected the British Isles on Wednesday 2 November and Thursday 3 November. The Met Office issued yellow weather warnings for wind and rain for 2 and 3 November, affecting large parts of Wales, northern England, Scotland and all of Northern Ireland.

=== Storm Eva (Ottilie) ===
Storm Eva (Ottilie)
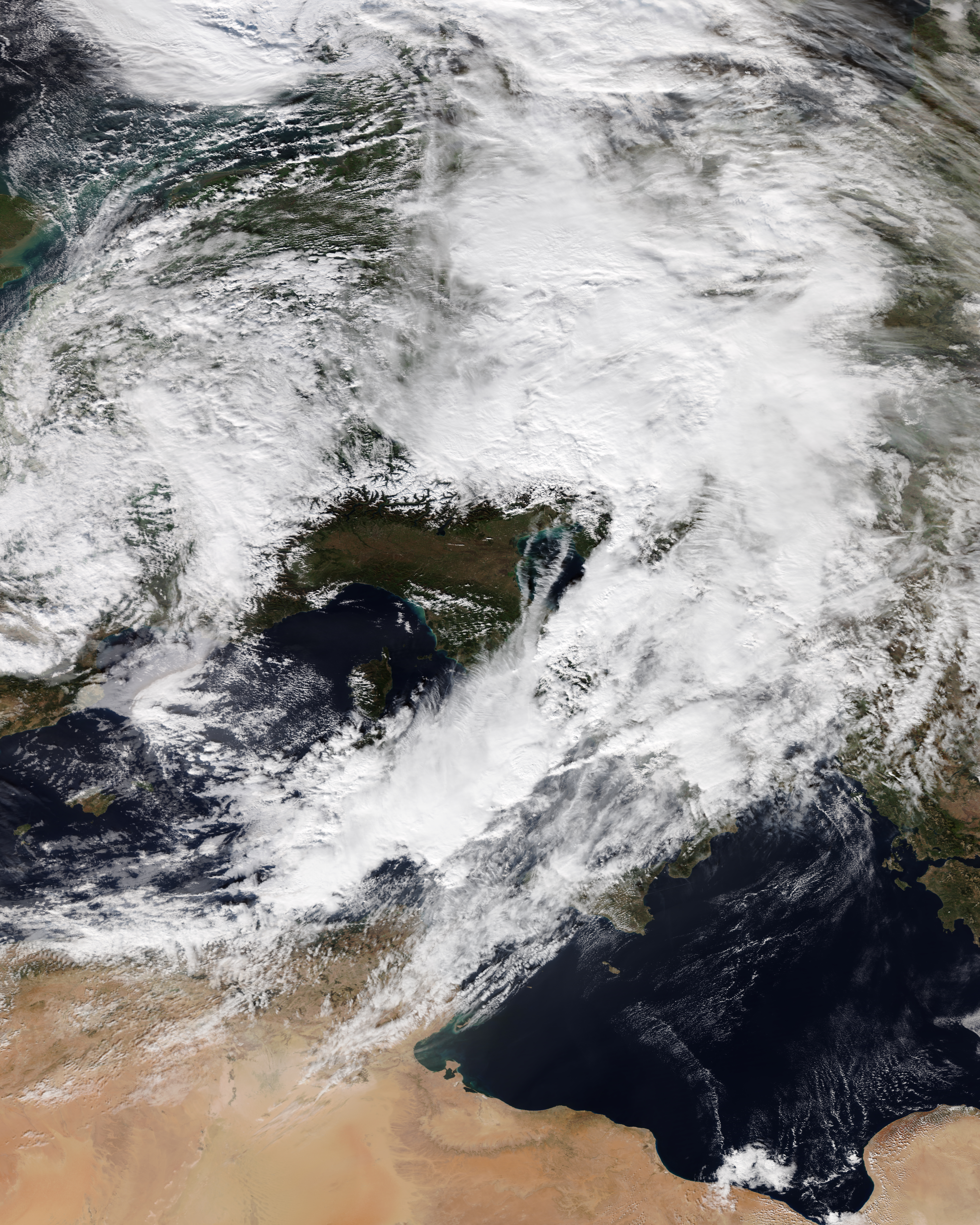
- Storm Eva over the Alps on 4 November 2022

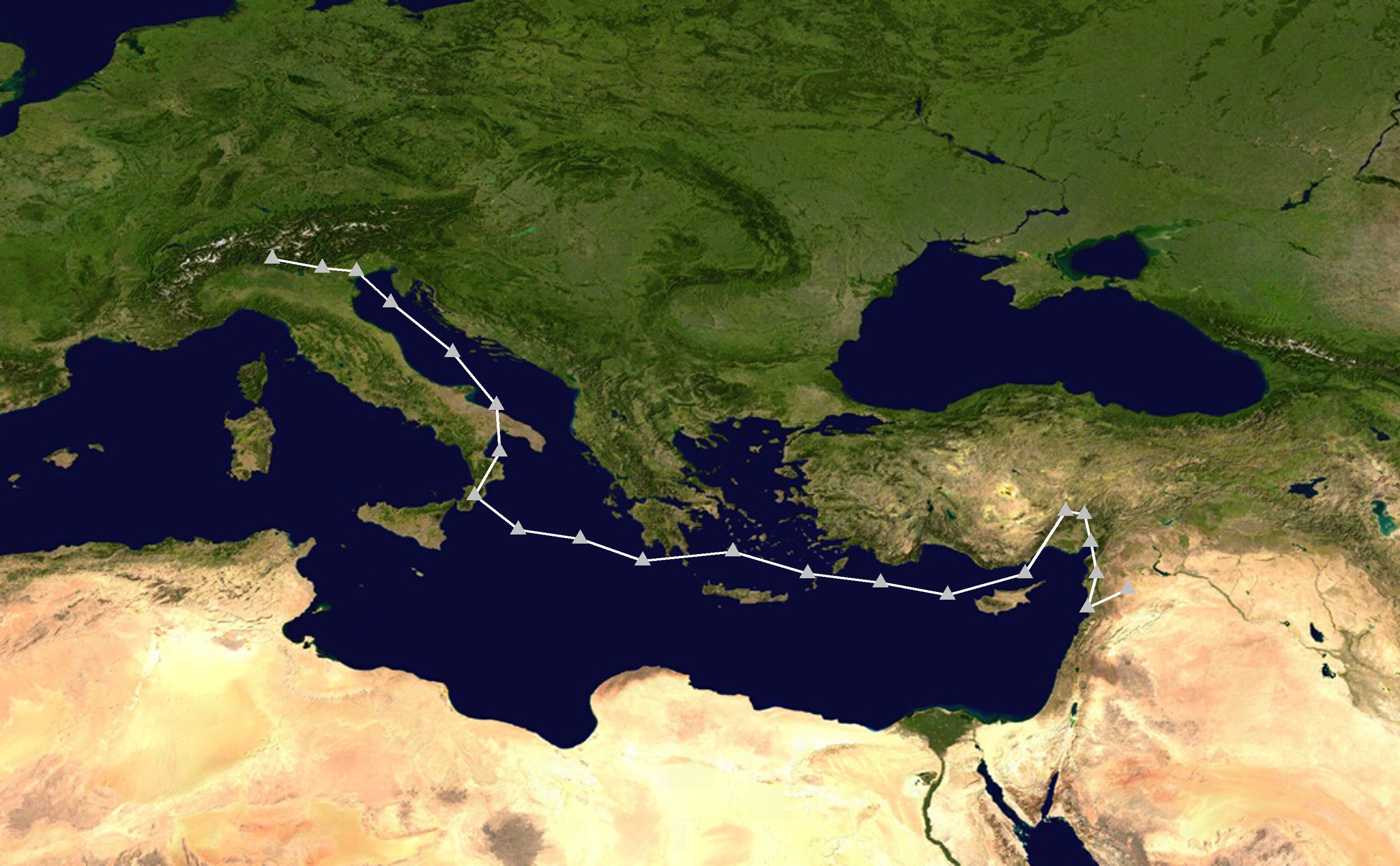
- Track of Storm Eva according to the FUB
- Area affected: Italy, Libya, Albania, Montenegro, Bosnia & Herzegovina, Croatia, Turkey and Greece
- Date of impact: 4–10 November
- Maximum wind gust: 110 km/h (68 mph)
- Lowest pressure: 1,000 hPa (29.53 inHg)
- Fatalities: 0
- Power outages: Unspecified
- Damage: Unspecified

Storm Eva was named on 4 November 2022. Amber warnings were put in place for southern Italy, and red warnings were put in place for Greece.

=== Storm Philomena ===
Storm Philomena
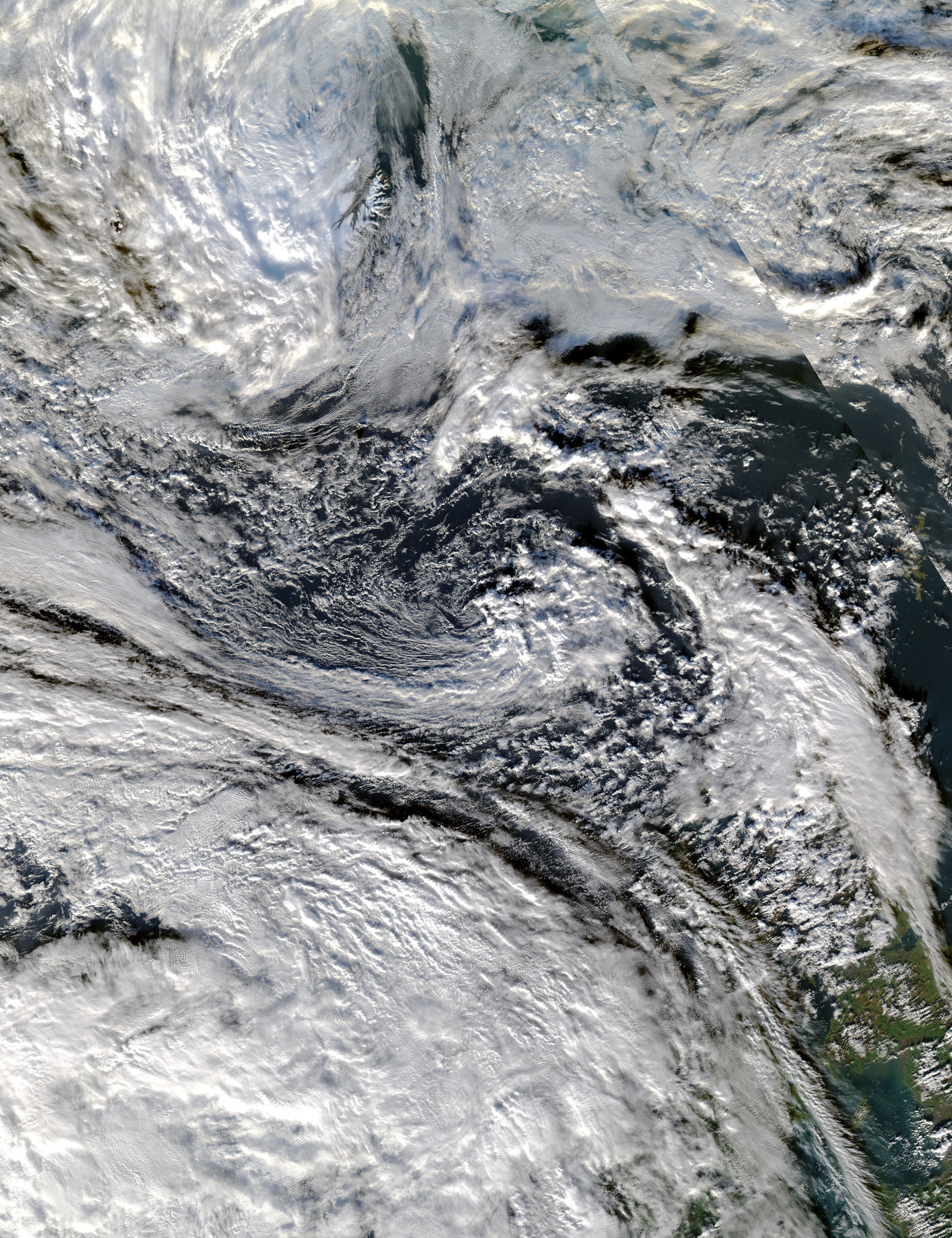
- Storm Philomena near peak intensity while north of Scotland on 9 November

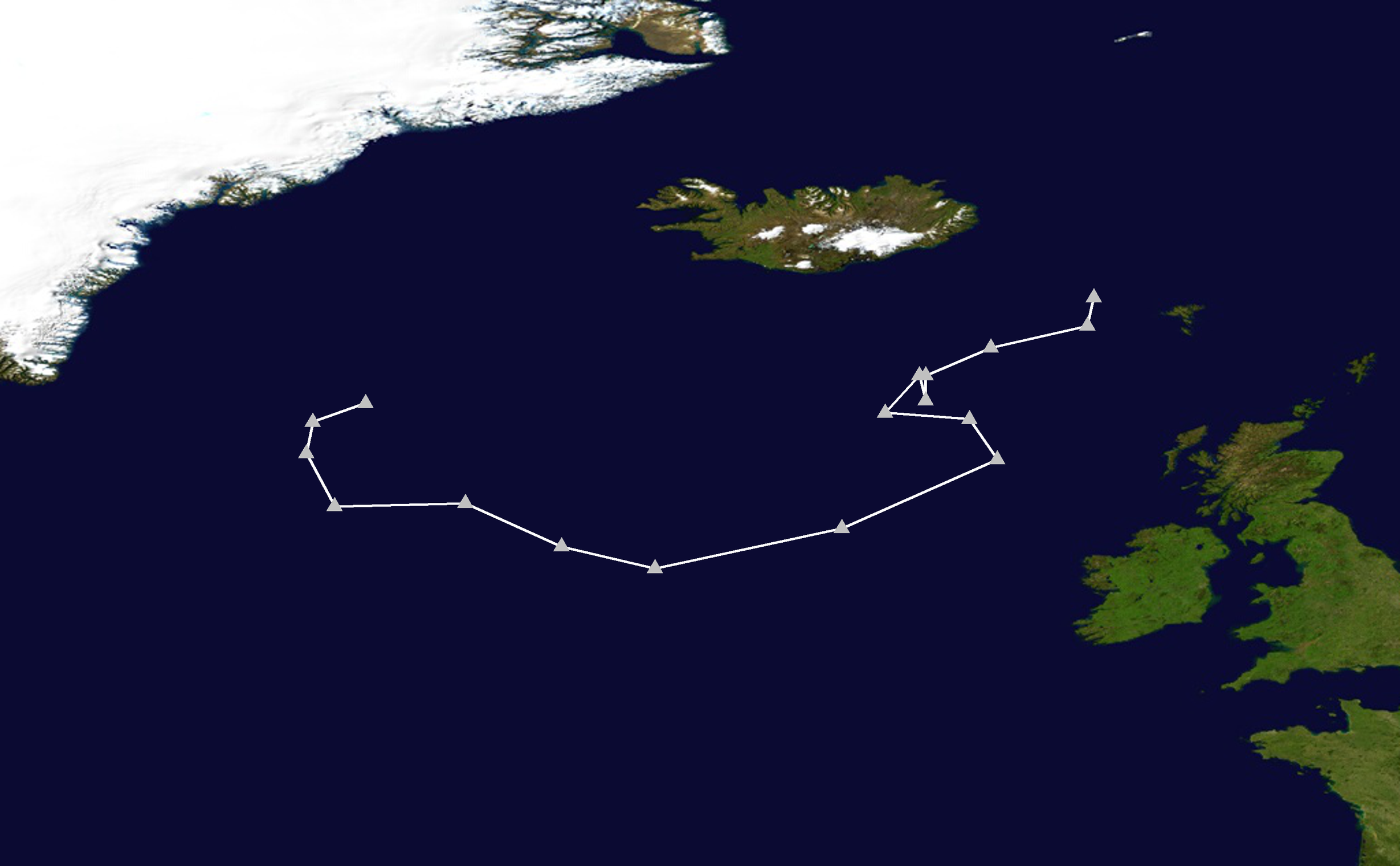
- Track of Storm Philomena according to the FUB
- Area affected: United Kingdom
- Date of impact: 7–10 November 2022
- Maximum wind gust: 110 km/h (68 mph)
- Lowest pressure: 970 hPa (28.64 inHg)
- Fatalities: 0
- Damage: Unspecified

Storm Philomena was named on 7 November 2022. The storm caused wind gusts of over 70 mph (110 km/h) in Cornwall, and on 10 November, the storm entered a dissipation stage for the Storm Quisina.

=== Storm Regina ===
Storm Regina
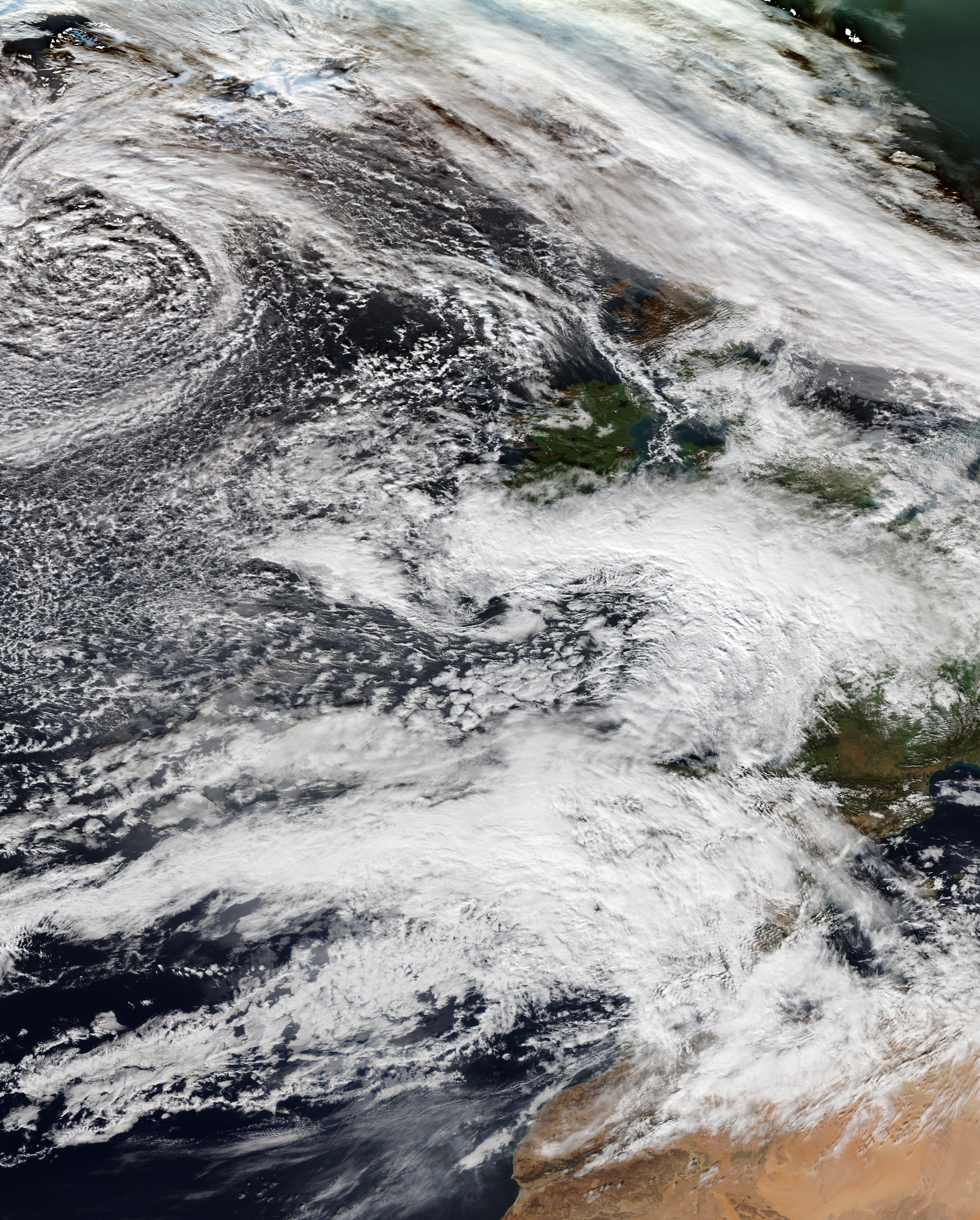
- Storm Regina passing south of Ireland on 16 November

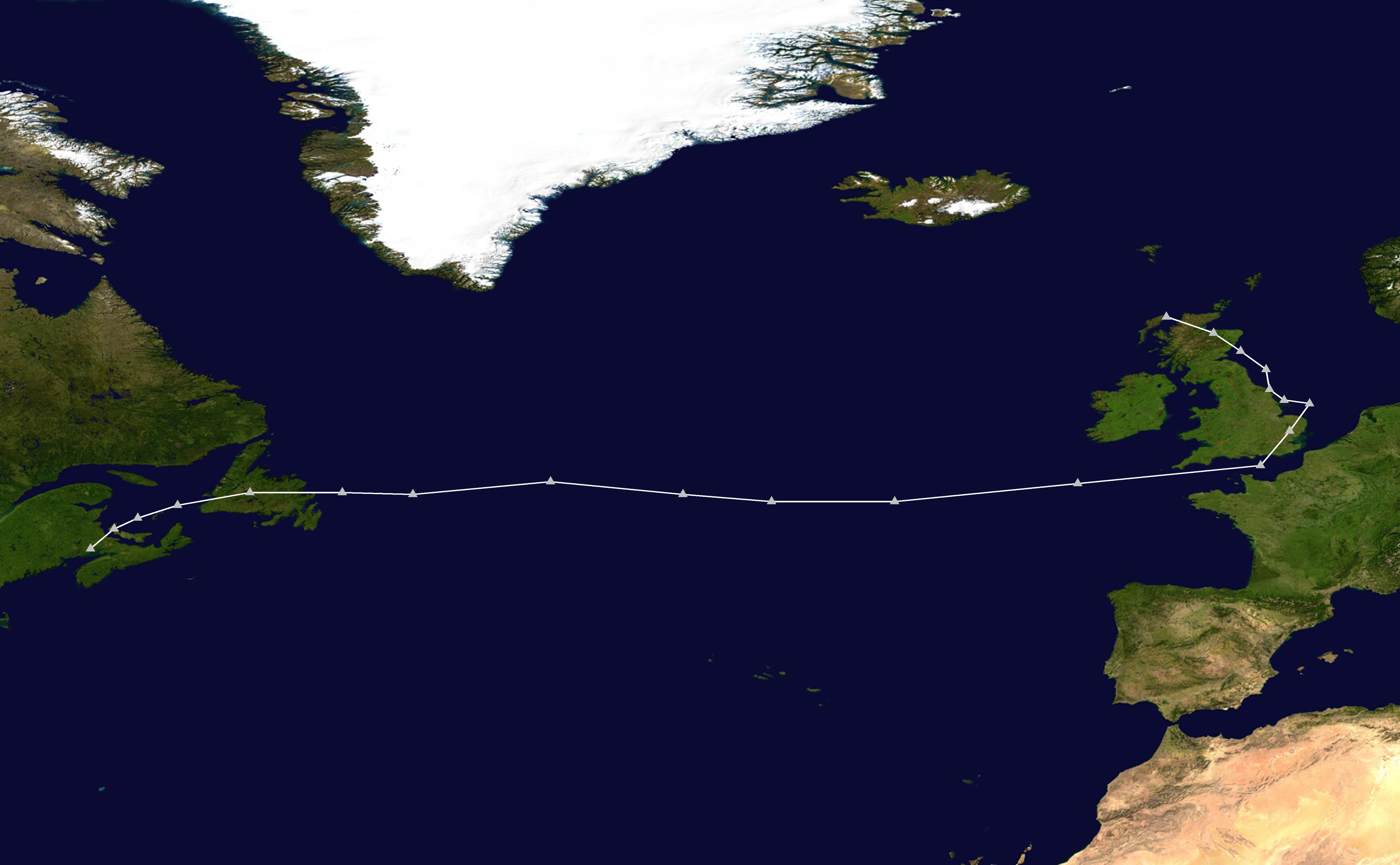
- Track of Storm Regina according to the FUB
- Area affected: British Isles, East Canada, Northern France
- Date of impact: 14 – 21 November 2022
- Lowest pressure: 975 hPa (28.79 inHg)
- Fatalities: None
- Power outages: None
- Damage: Unspecified

Storm Regina was named by the FUB on 14 November 2022. The storm passed through the United Kingdom on 17–18 November. The storm caused heavy rainfall in both Scotland and England.

=== Storm Fobos ===
Storm Fobos
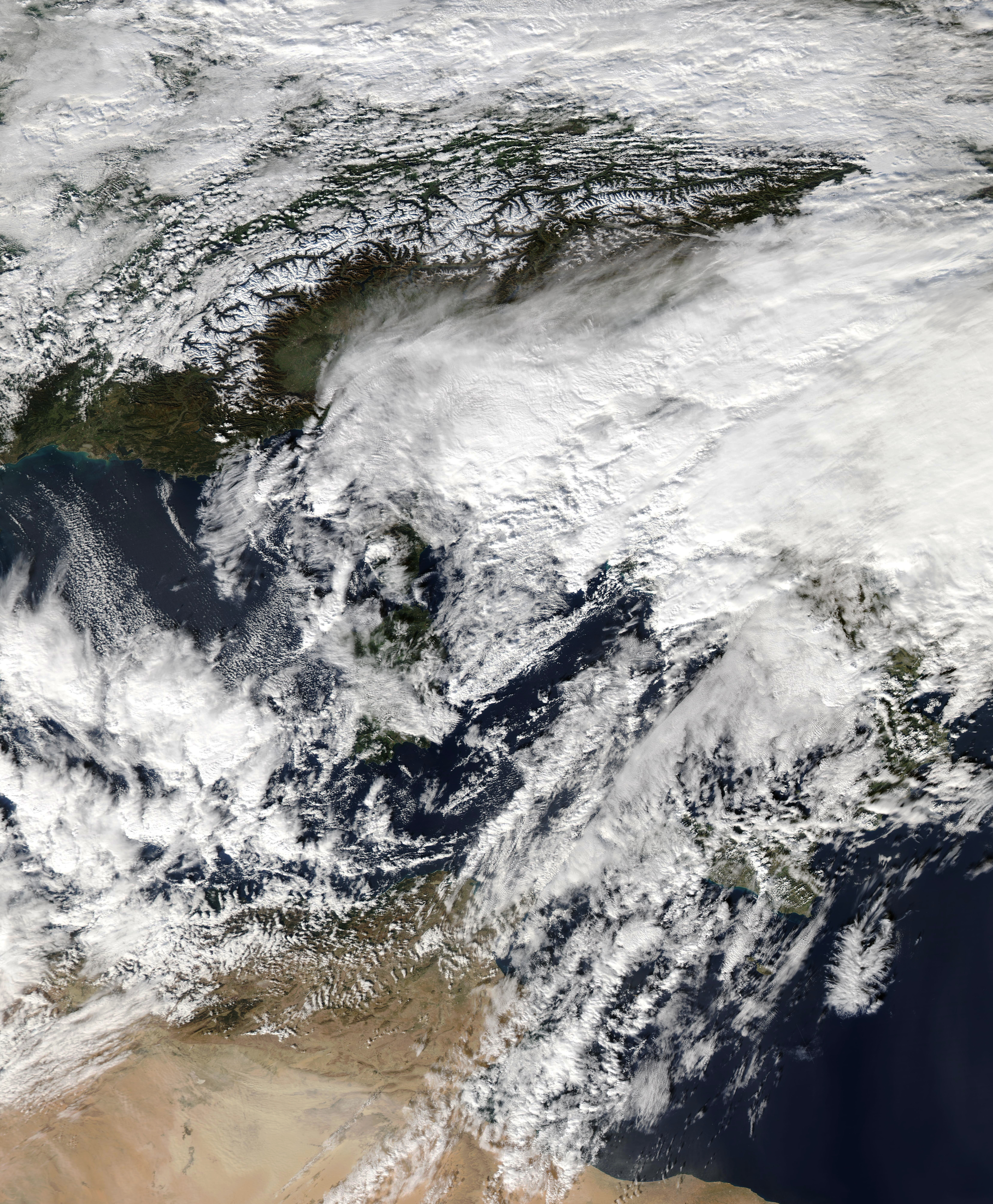
- Storm Fobos near Italy on 19 November

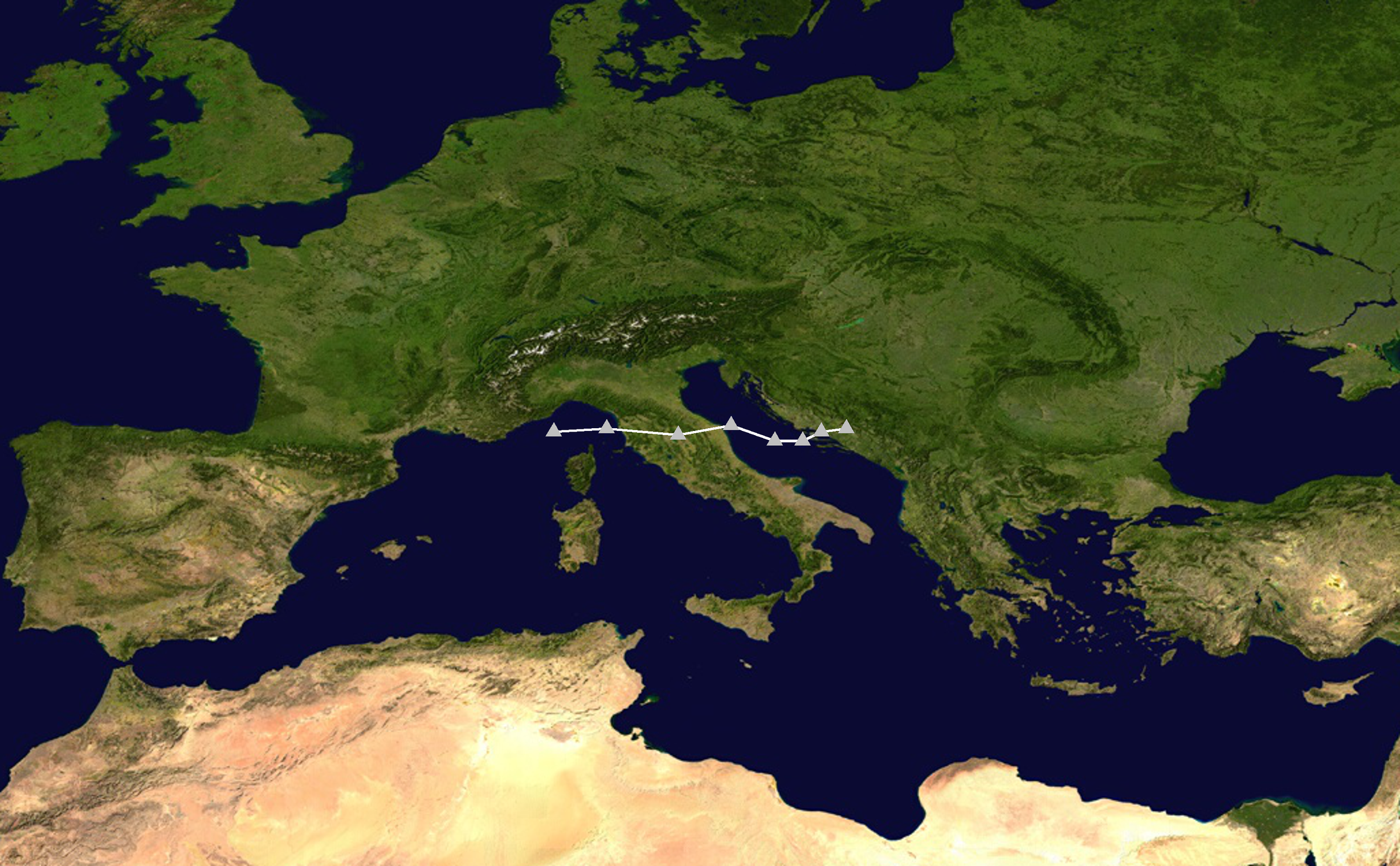
- Track of Storm Fobos according to the University of Berlin
- Area affected: Italy, Montenegro, South East France
- Date of impact: 19 – 24 November 2022
- Lowest pressure: 1,005 hPa (29.68 inHg)
- Fatalities: None
- Power outages: None
- Damage: Unspecified

Storm Fobos was named by the Institute of Hydrometeorology and Seismology of Montenegro on 19 November 2022. The storm dissipated on 24 November.

=== Storm Denise ===
Storm Denise
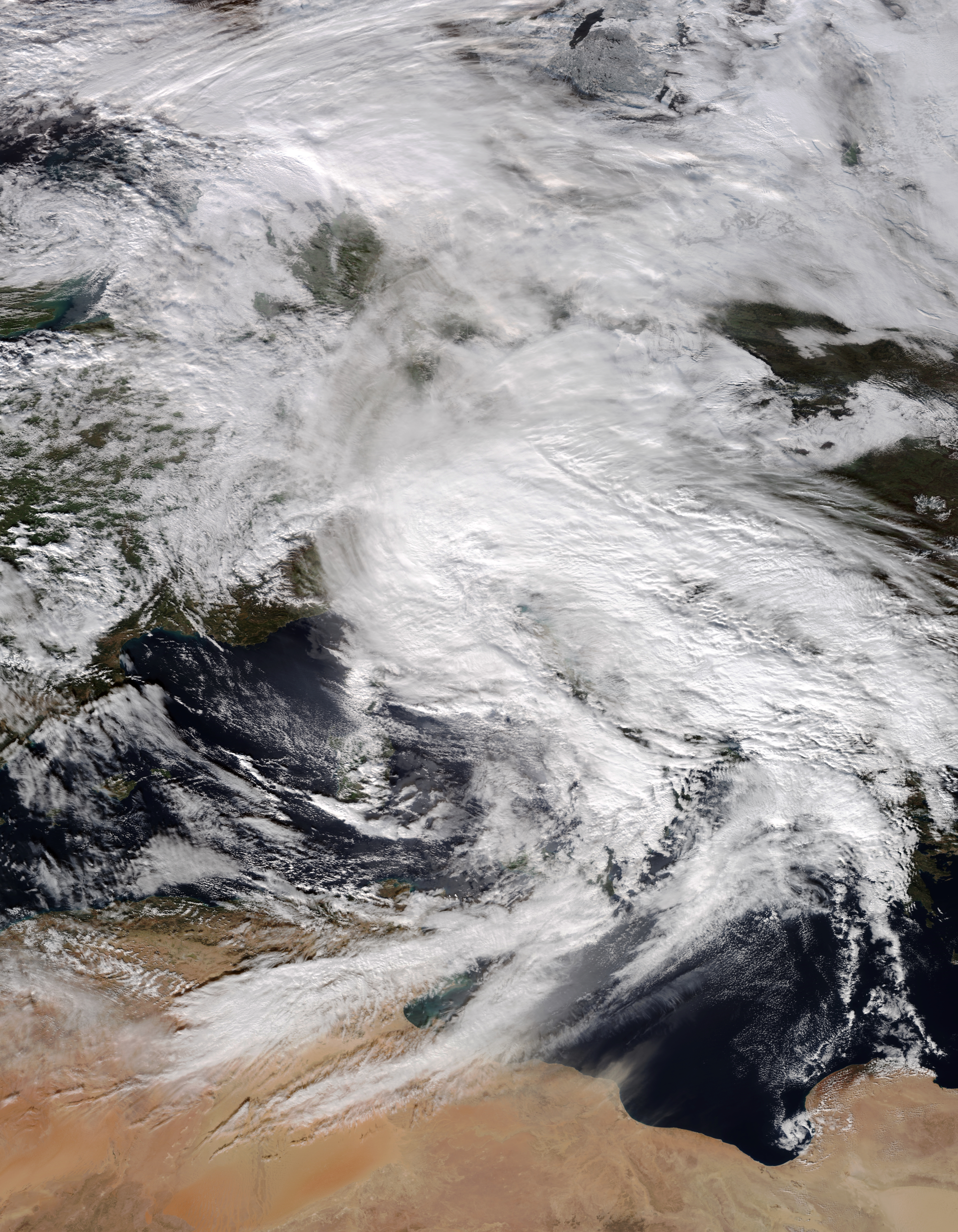
- Storm Denise approaching Italy on 22 November

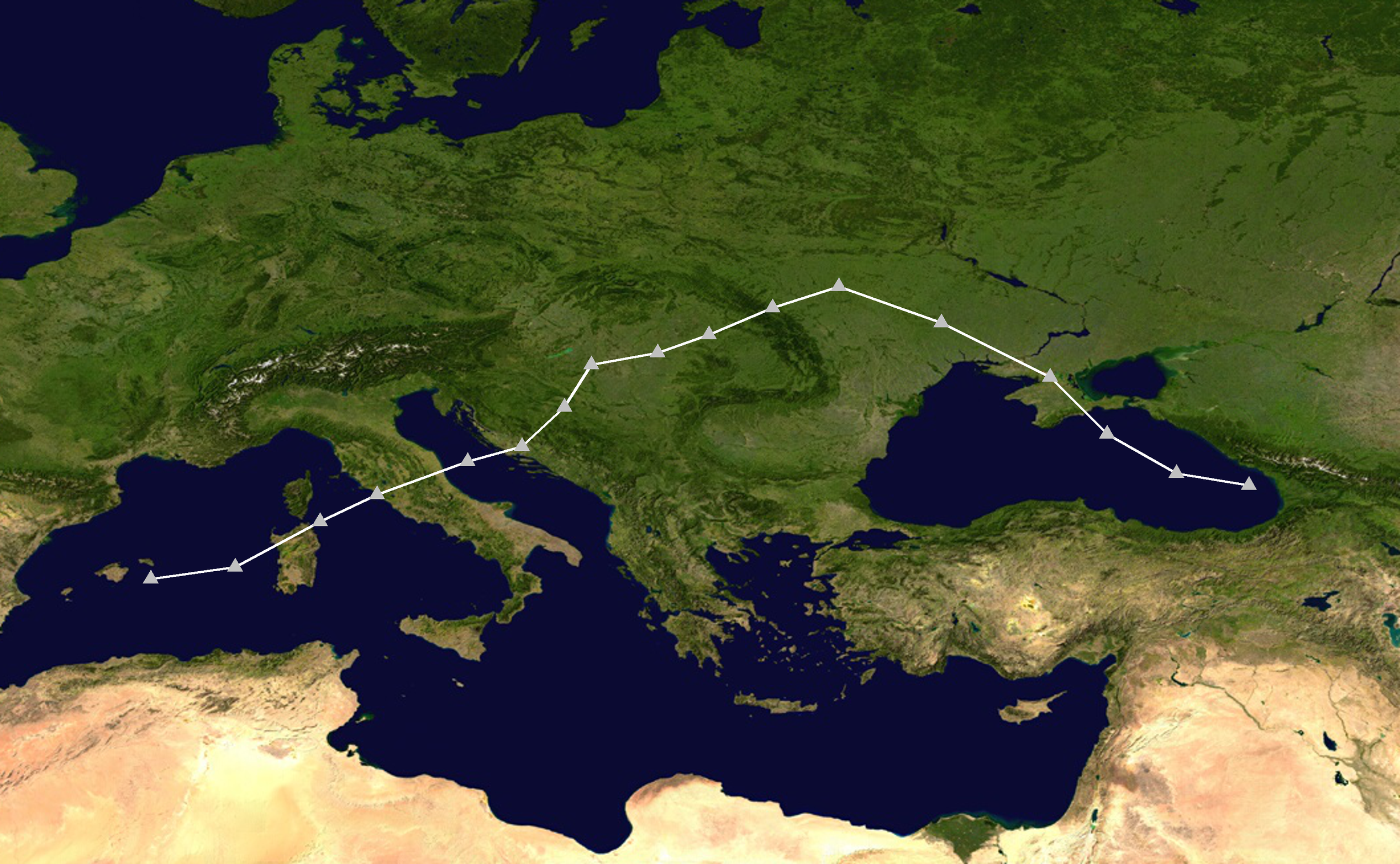
- Track of Storm Denise according to the University of Berlin
- Area affected: Spain, Corsica, Italy, Balkans, Ukraine, Russia
- Date of impact: 21 – 27 November 2022
- Maximum wind gust: 100 kilometres per hour (62 mph)
- Lowest pressure: 990 hPa (29.23 inHg)
- Fatalities: 14 (all in Italy)
- Damage: €2 Million (£1.7 Million)

Storm Denise was named by the AEMET on 21 November 2022. The storm caused wind gusts of more than 100 kilometres per hour (62 mph) winds in Mallorca. In Venice, several schools were closed and water levels rose 170 centimetres (5.6 ft), the third most highest recording since modern records began. In Trieste, winds of more than 100 kilometres per hour (62 mph) were reported by Vigili del Fuoco. Stormy weather and roughs seas also affected areas in Sicily where ferry services were disrupted from the port at Milazzo. Heavy rain caused some flooding in the Province of Oristano in Sardinia on 22 November. Several people were evacuated in the small town of Bosa. Crashing waves, high tides and storm surge flooded shores along Italy's coastline. Coastal flooding was reported in the provinces of Rome and Latina in the Lazio Region. New Agency ANSA reported a tidal barrier was severely damaged in Ostia. Firefighters rescued families trapped in 1 metre deep floods in coastal areas near Anzio. On the Adriatic Coast, storm surge and high seas flooded coastal areas of Emilia-Romagna Region in the provinces of Forlì-Cesana, Ferrara, Rimini and Ravenna. Flooding was also reported in coastal areas of the Marche Region, including Marina di Montemarciano and Senigallia.

On 22 November, the storm made landfall in Italy. On 23 November, the storm made another landfall in the Balkans. On 25 November, the storm entered the Black Sea and the day after, the storm passed close to Ukraine and Russia. Denise dissipated on 27 November.

On 24 November, an Argentine tourist drowned after being swept into the sea in Furore, while a man was struck and killed by lightning on a beach in Vico Equense. The storm also partially triggered a landslide on the Italian Island of Ischia, killing 12 people.

The government has approved a state of emergency, allocating an initial sum of €2m (£1.7m) to help rebuild homes.

=== Storm Ariel (Yuki) ===
Storm Ariel
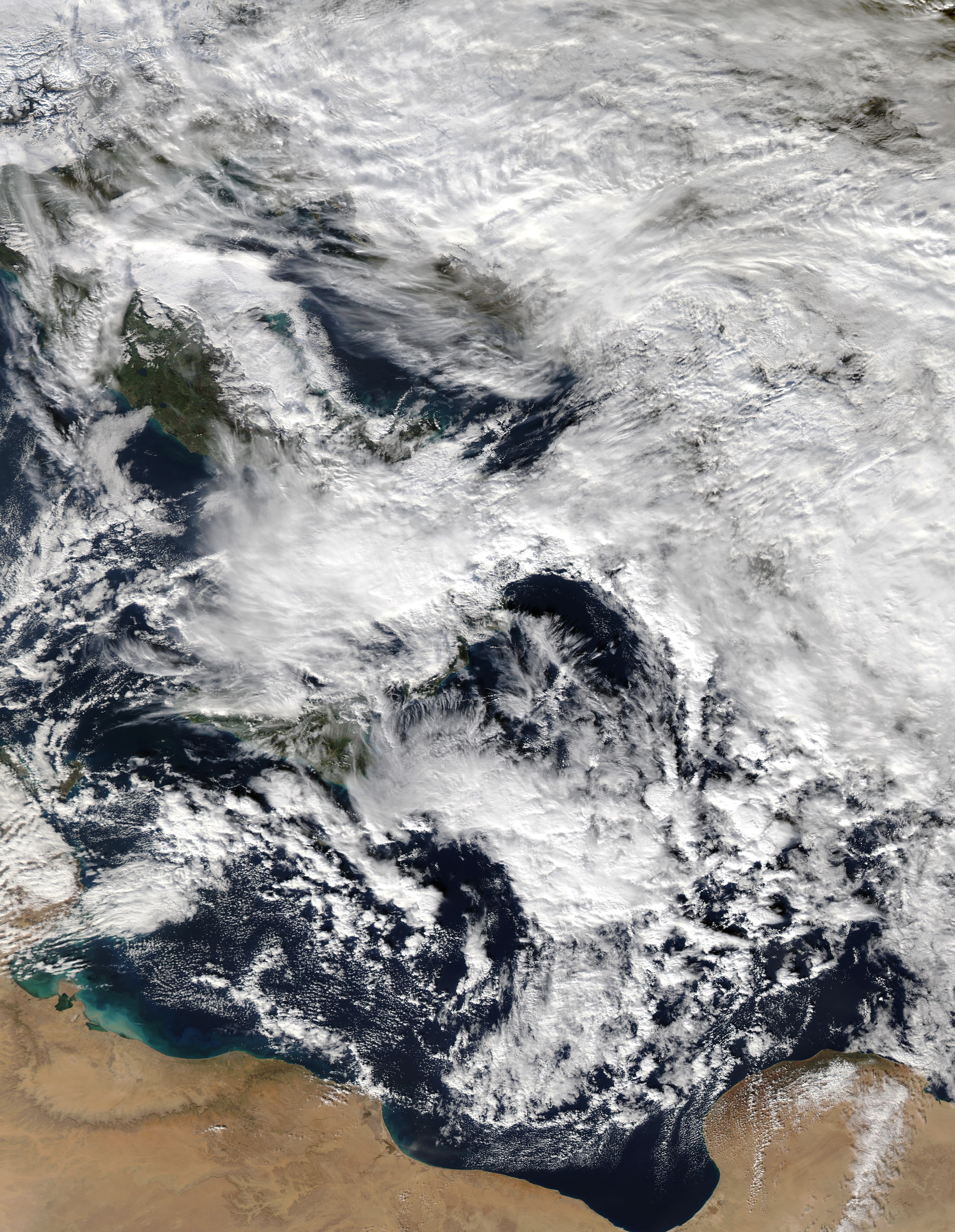
- Storm Ariel on 29 November 2022

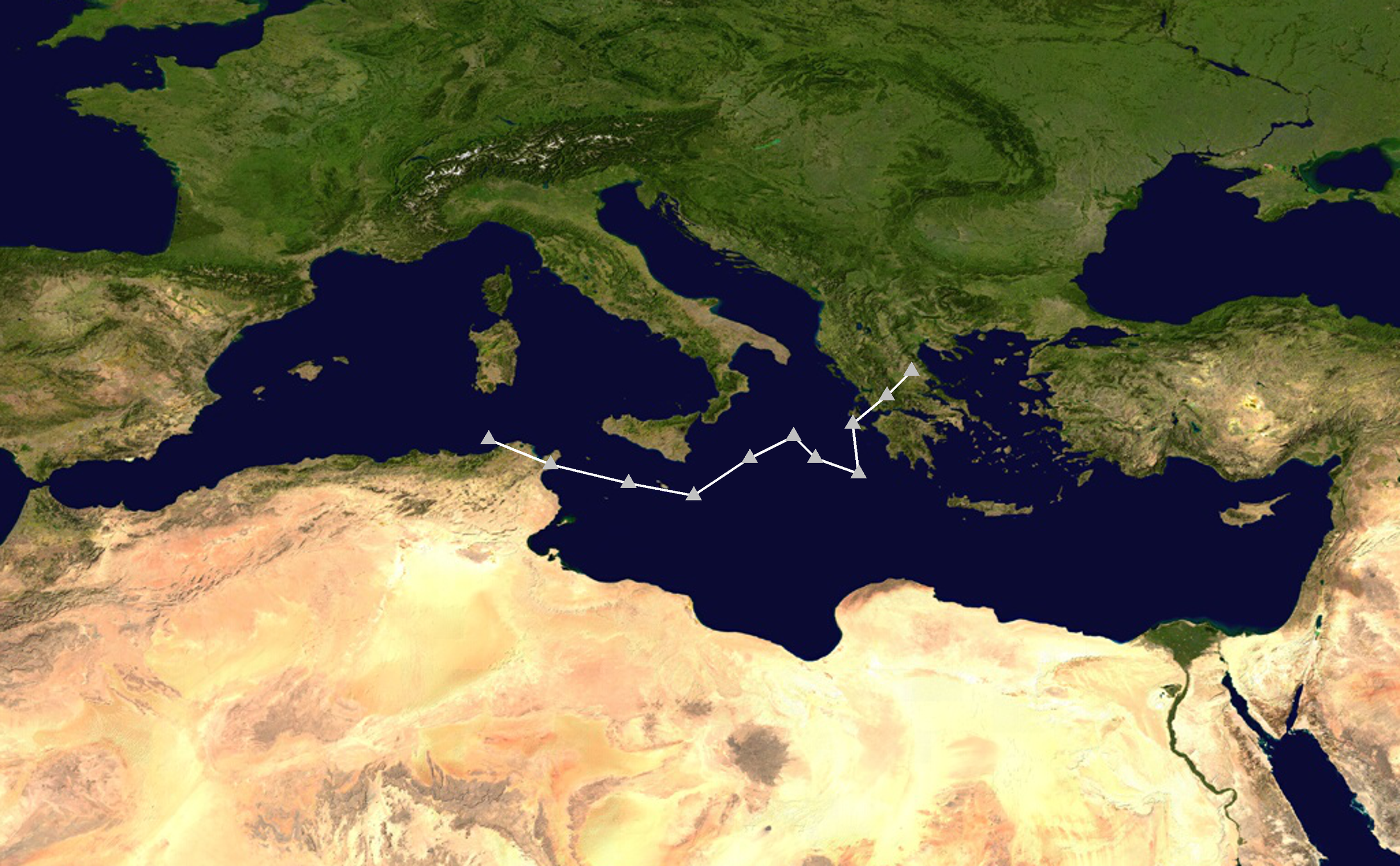
- Track of Storm Ariel according to the University of Berlin
- Area affected: Italy, Greece, Macedonia, Malta, North East Algeria and North West Tunisia
- Date of impact: 29 November – 2 December 2022
- Lowest pressure: 1,005 hPa (29.68 inHg)
- Fatalities: None
- Power outages: Several homes
- Damage: Unspecified

Storm Ariel was named by the Hellenic National Meteorological Service on 29 November 2022. The same system was named as Yuki by Deutscher Wetterdienst. Ariel caused power outages in many cities and islands. Several schools were closed in Skopelos. Ariel dissipated on 2 December 2022.

=== Storm Efraín ===
Storm Efrain
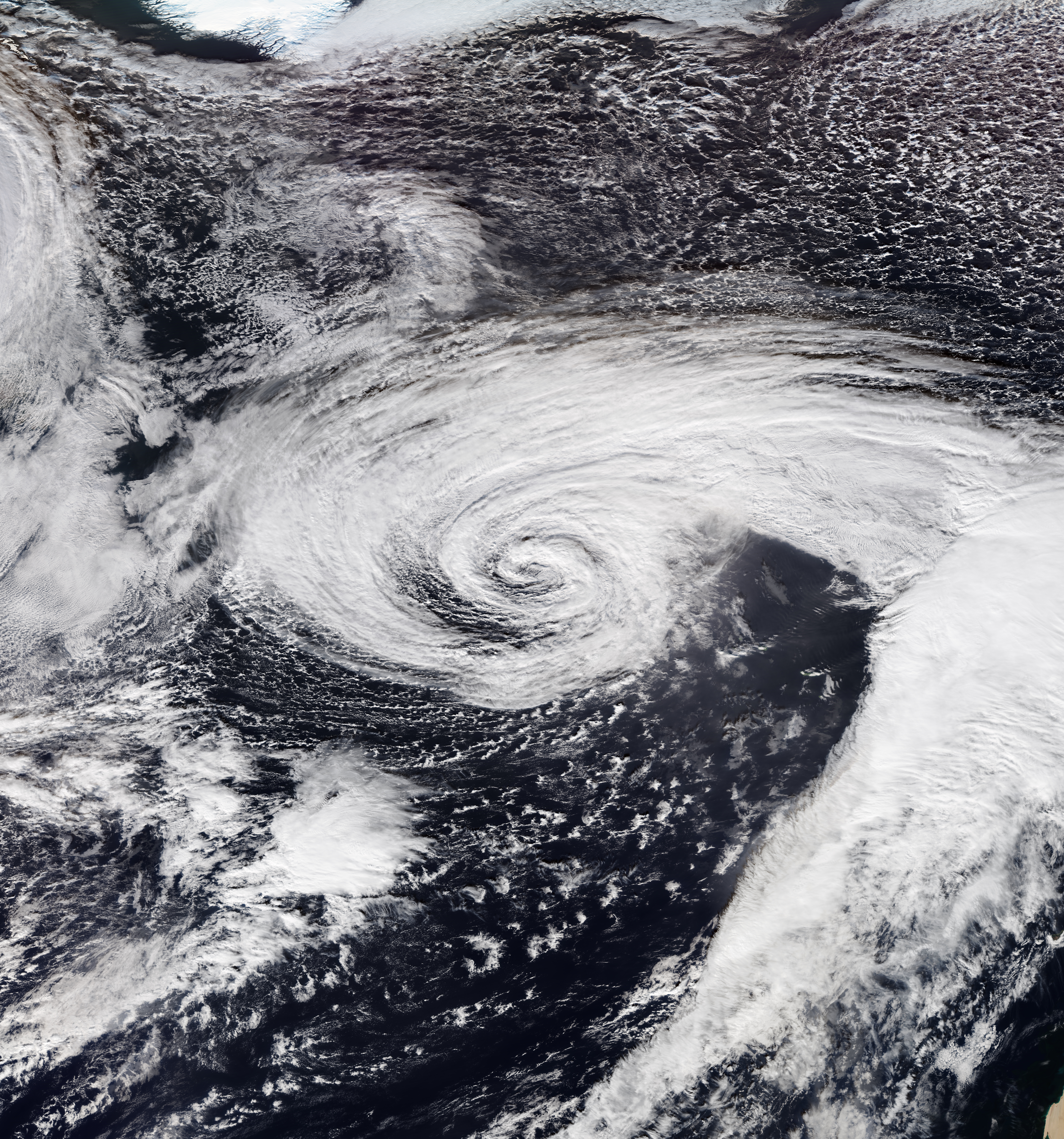
- Storm Efrain on 10 December

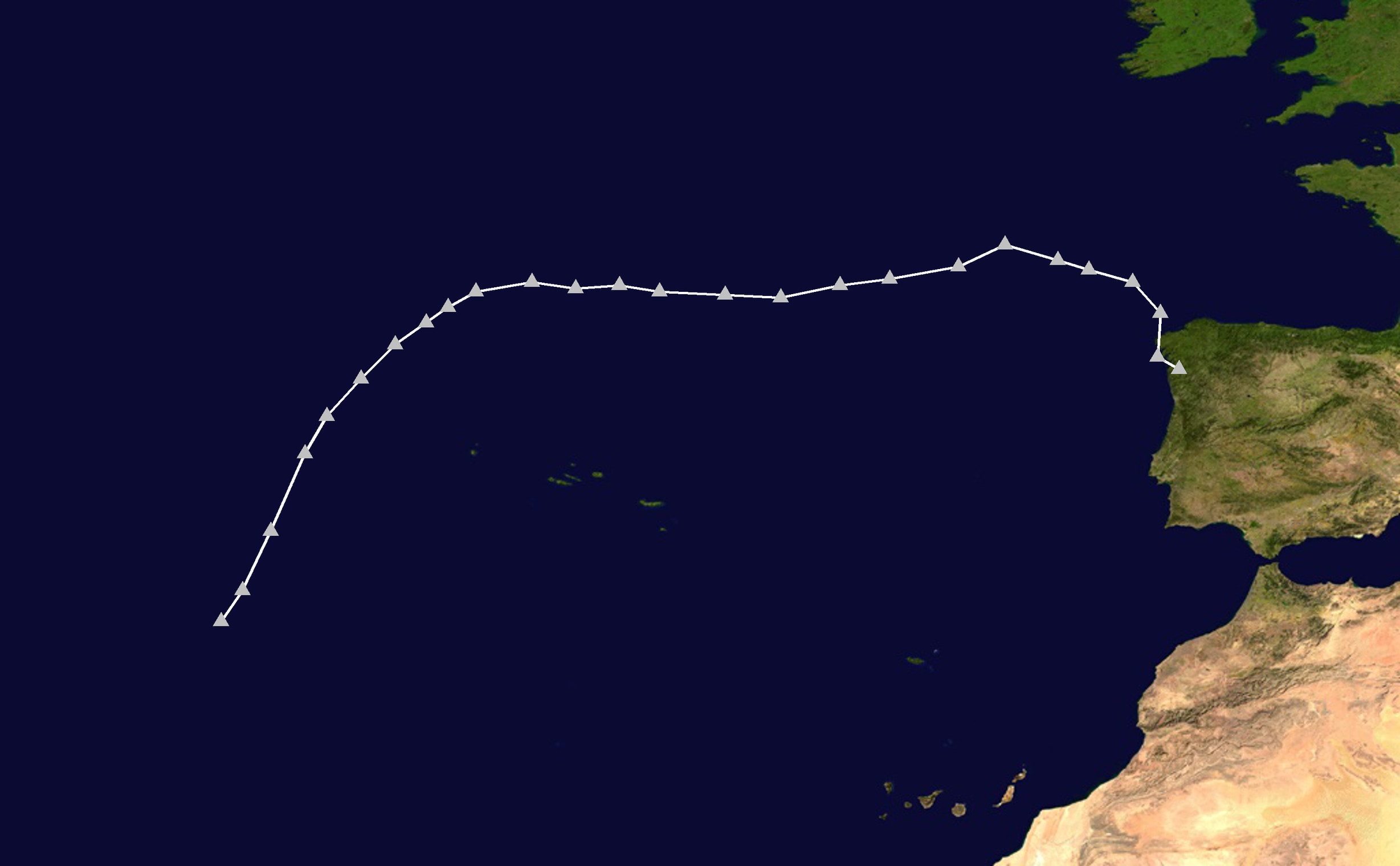
- Track of Storm Efrain according to the University of Berlin
- Area affected: Portugal, France
- Date of impact: 10 December 2022 – 17 December 2022
- Lowest pressure: 955 hPa (28.20 inHg)
- Fatalities: 3 (Indirect)
- Power outages: None
- Damage: Unspecified

Storm Efraín was named on 10 December 2022. Crossing the cold waters heading towards the Azores and the Iberian Peninsula, a powerful anticyclone blocking its path to higher latitudes, the storm quickly intensified thanks to the presence of an atmospheric river of subtropical origin associated with its southern flank. The storm hit the Iberian Peninsula and France from 13 to 16 December before dissipating.

Efraín brought strong winds, heavy rains and rough seas to the Azores. Flooding due to heavy rains affected the provinces of Extremadura and Castilla-La Mancha in Spain. Strong gusts and rain caused landslides on the famous Caminito del Rey in Andalusia. Several stations in Madrid have been forced to close due to flooding. An environmental officer drowned during a flood in Villarino de los Aires (Salamanca).

In Portugal, Efraín caused flooding in the Tagus River basin. According to the Portuguese Civil Protection Agency, a government body, some 5,000 rescue workers were on duty across the country and authorities estimated the damage at millions of euros.

In France, the freezing rain and snow associated with the warm front of the system disrupted transport. Two accidents in Saône-et-Loire caused the death of a motorist on the A39 motorway and two truck drivers on a secondary road. The Minister of Transport, Clément Beaune, announced the cancellation of part of the flights from Orly and Roissy-Charles-de-Gaulle airports. In Lyon, all the buses remained stationary for part of a morning to avoid accidents.

=== Storm Gaia (Birgit) ===
Storm Gaia
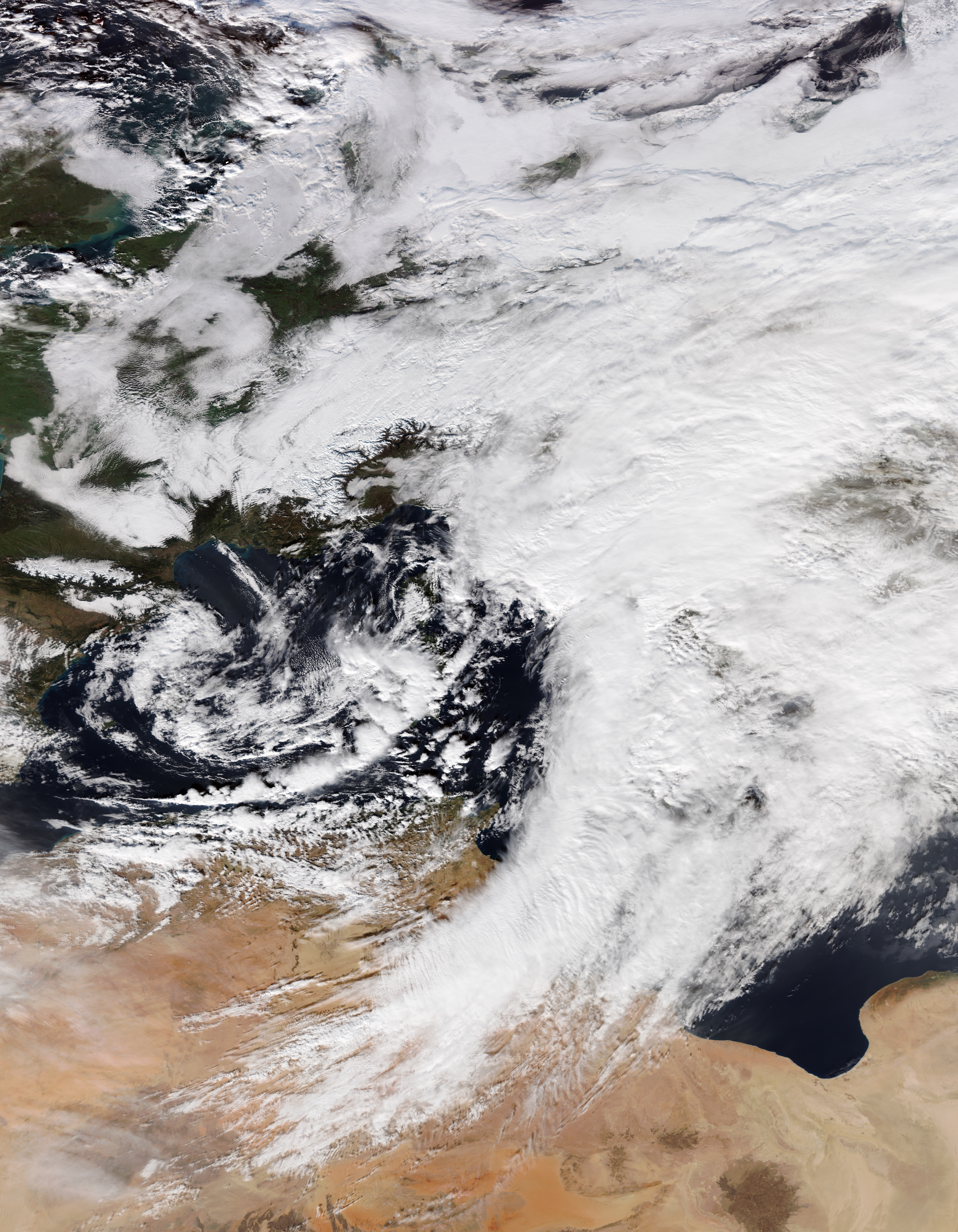
- Storm Gaia on 10 December

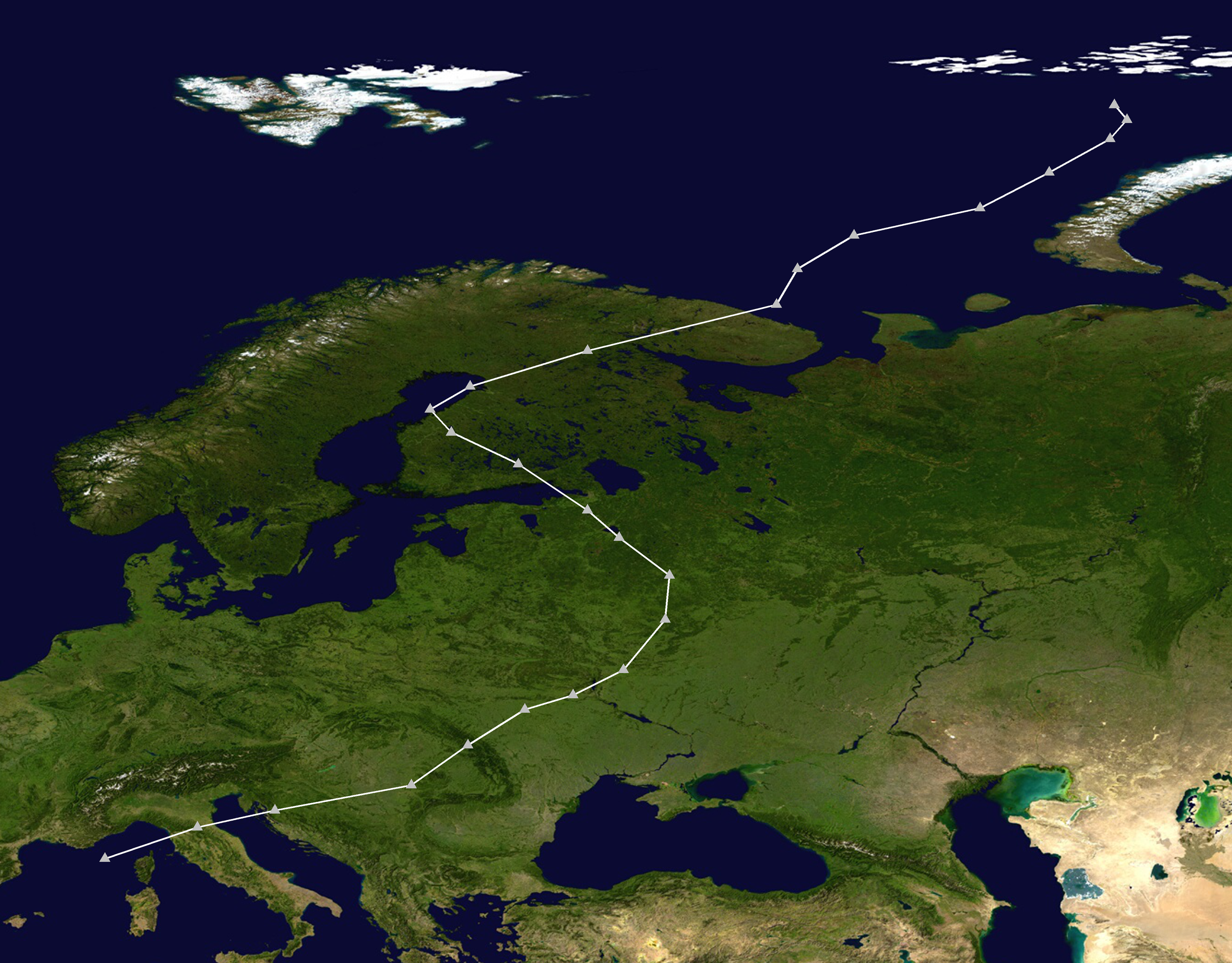
- Track of Storm Gaia according to the University of Berlin
- Area affected: Italy, Slovenia, Croatia, Albania, Greece, Macedonia, Romania, Moldova, Ukraine, Belarus, Russia, Lithuania, Latvia, Estonia and Finland
- Date of impact: 10 December 2022 – 17 December 2022
- Maximum wind gust: 120 km/h (75 mph)
- Lowest pressure: 995 hPa (29.38 inHg)
- Fatalities: None

Storm Gaia was named on 10 December 2022. In preparation, Greece issued warnings as trees fell and flooding caused by heavy rain occurred.

=== Storm Fien (Harto) ===
Storm Fien
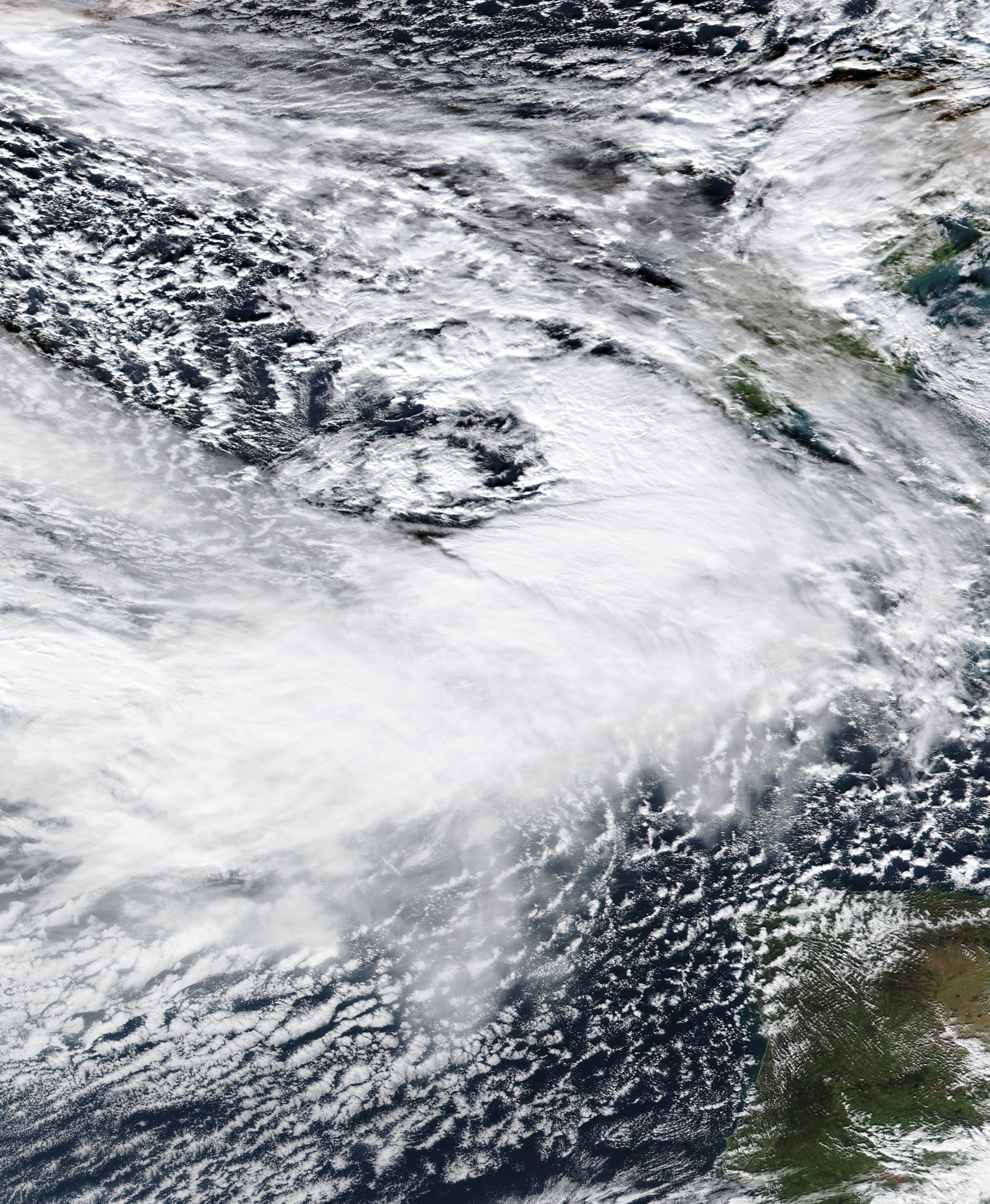
- Area affected: Spain, France, Italy & Central Europe.
- Date of impact: 14–20 January 2023
- Maximum wind gust: 150 km/h (93 mph) (Pyrenees)
- Lowest pressure: Unspecified
- Fatalities: 1

On 14 January 2023, the Spanish State Meteorological Agency (AEMet) assigned the name Fien to the depression then located on Newfoundland. It was moving towards the south of the British Isles. It reached the Bay of Biscay on 17 January. Then crossing into the Mediterranean, it passed over northern Italy on the 18th and turned northward to end up in the Baltic countries the following day. At 0:00 UTC on 20 January, Fien reached northwestern Russia.

Consequently, Orange marine weather warnings for high winds were issued by AEMET for 15 January for north-western Galicia province, with yellow marine wind warnings stretching all the way to the border with France in Basque.

In France, the southwest was affected during the night of 16 to 17 January. Winds of up to 150 km/h (93 mph) were recorded in the Pyrenees, toppling trees and cutting off electricity to 15,000 customers in Nouvelle-Aquitaine and Occitania but without major damage or casualties. According to Météo-France, 30 to 40 mm (1.2 to 1.6 in) of rain fell in the Landes and Pyrénées-Atlantiques, and up to 55 mm (2.2 in) in Tarbes, while above a certain altitude the rain changed to snow. The rain caused flooding in places. Snow in Auvergne-Rhône-Alpes, Haute-Savoie and the Massif Central caused difficulties on the roads and forced the closure of schools. In Corsica, a landslide disrupted trains between Ajaccio and Bastia and ferries were canceled by Corsica Linea.

In Spain, almost the entire country has been put on high alert for high winds, heavy rain and snow, depending on altitude, as well as rough seas. In the north, rivers approached overflow level. An 80-year-old man who disappeared during the storm has been found dead in the port of the Basque town of Bermeo. In Sondika, emergency services rescued a bus full of children stuck on a flooded road. Winds of up to 90 km/h (56 mph) in Barcelona caused damage. After its passage, arctic air gave way to very cold temperatures.

=== Storm Gérard (Gero) ===
Storm Gérard
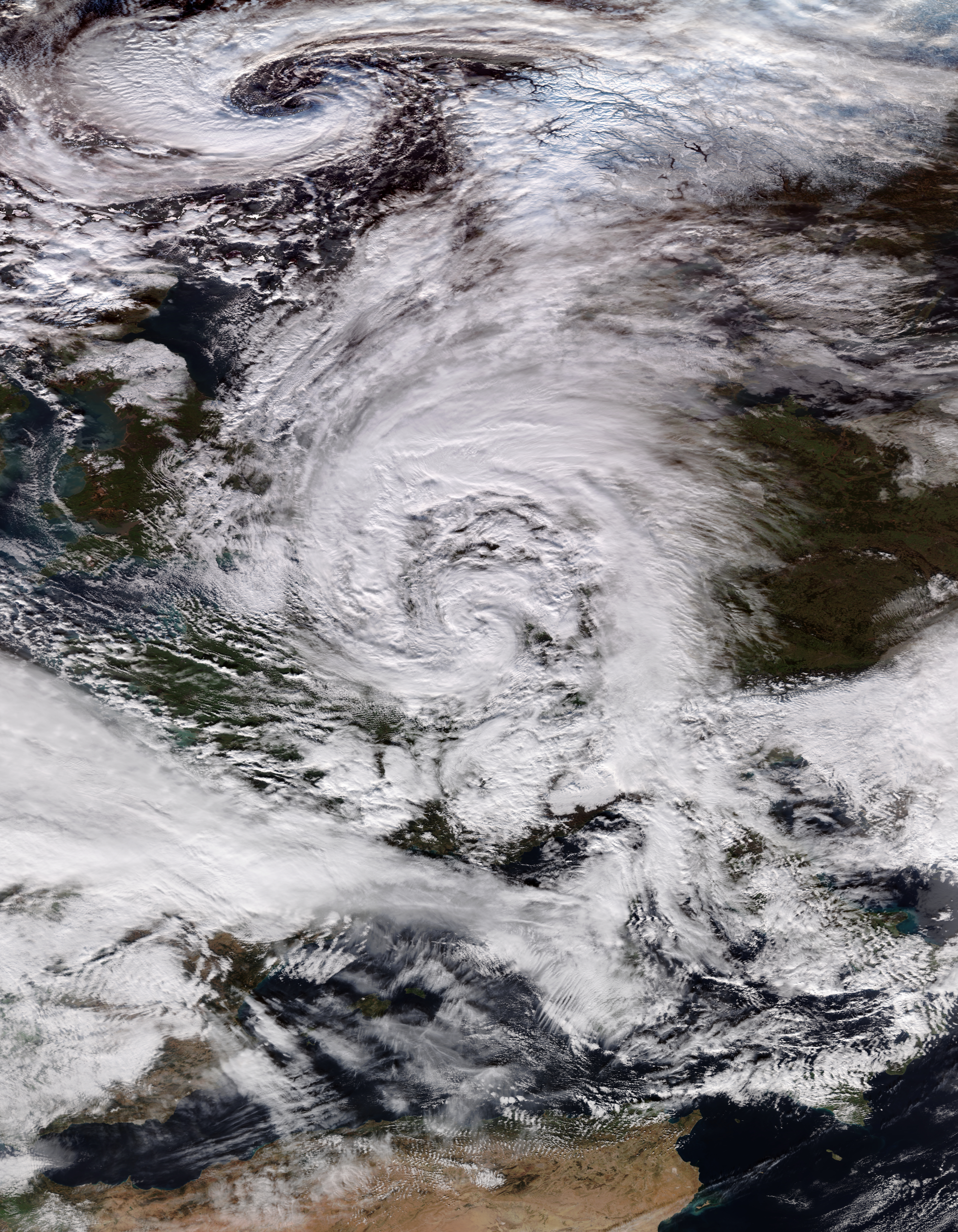
- Storm Gérard over eastern France on 16 January 2023

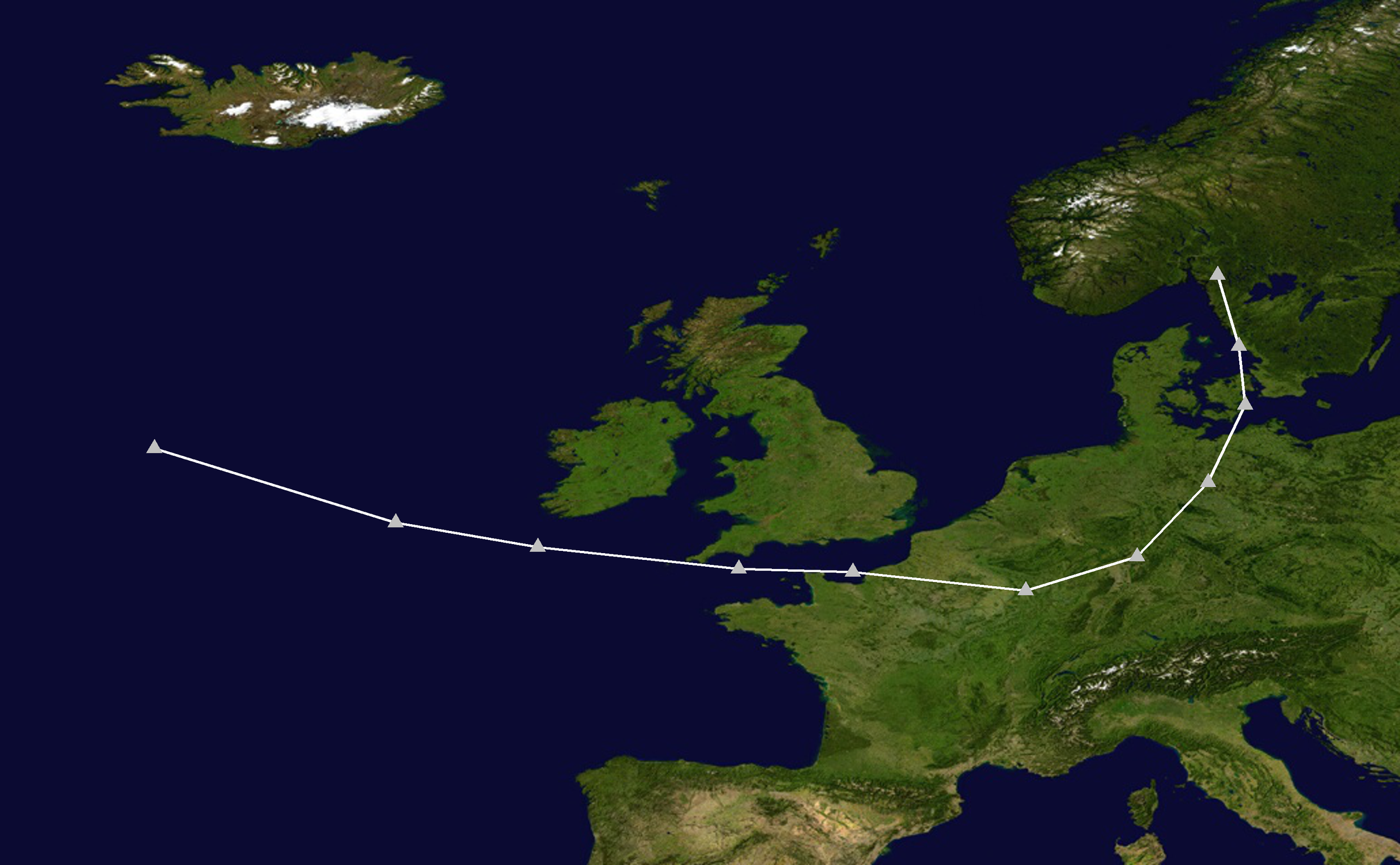
- Track of storm Gérard according to the University of Berlin
- Area affected: United Kingdom, France, Germany, Denmark, Netherlands, Ireland, Belgium, Luxembourg and West Scandinavia
- Date of impact: 15–17 January 2023
- Maximum wind gust: 163 km/h (101 mph) at Brittany coast
- Lowest pressure: 973 hPa (28.73 inHg)
- Fatalities: None
- Power outages: 75,000 customers

Storm Gérard was named on 15 January 2023.

The storm brought strong wind gusts, sleet showers, snow showers, and abundant rainfall across the United Kingdom, Ireland, and Western Europe. Gérard caused strong winds and left at least 75,000 customers without electricity.

The strongest winds of up to 163 km/h (101 mph) were recorded on the Normandy coastline at Carteret, and wind gusts of 158 km/h (98 mph) were recorded on the Brittany coast at Pointe du Raz, while a gust of 132 km/h (82 mph) was recorded on top of the Eiffel Tower, Paris on Sunday night. The minimum central pressure within Gérard was around 973 hPa (28.7 inHg).

Strongest wind gusts registered from Storm Gérard in France
Location	Wind gust	1-minute sustained windspeed	Time (local – GMT+1)
Carteret, Normandy	163 km/h (101 mph)	112 km/h (70 mph)	06h-07h, 16 January 2023
Pointe du Raz, Brittany	158 km/h (98 mph)	109 km/h (68 mph)	03h-04h, 16 January 2023
Ile de Groix, Brittany	154 km/h (96 mph)	102 km/h (63 mph)	03h-04h, 16 January 2023
Belle Ile, Brittany	150 km/h (93 mph)	90 km/h (56 mph)	03h-04h, 16 January 2023
Pointe du Roc, Normandy	144 km/h (89 mph)	102 km/h (63 mph)	06h-07h, 16 January 2023
Vigie du Homet, Normandy	141 km/h (88 mph)	95 km/h (59 mph)	05h-06h, 16 January 2023
Pointe du Chemoulin, Pays de la Loire	137 km/h (85 mph)	94 km/h (58 mph)	03h-04h, 16 January 2023
Ushant (Ouessant), Brittany	137 km/h (85 mph)	93 km/h (58 mph)	02h-03h, 16 January 2023

=== Cyclone Hannelore (Jan) ===
Cyclone Hannelore
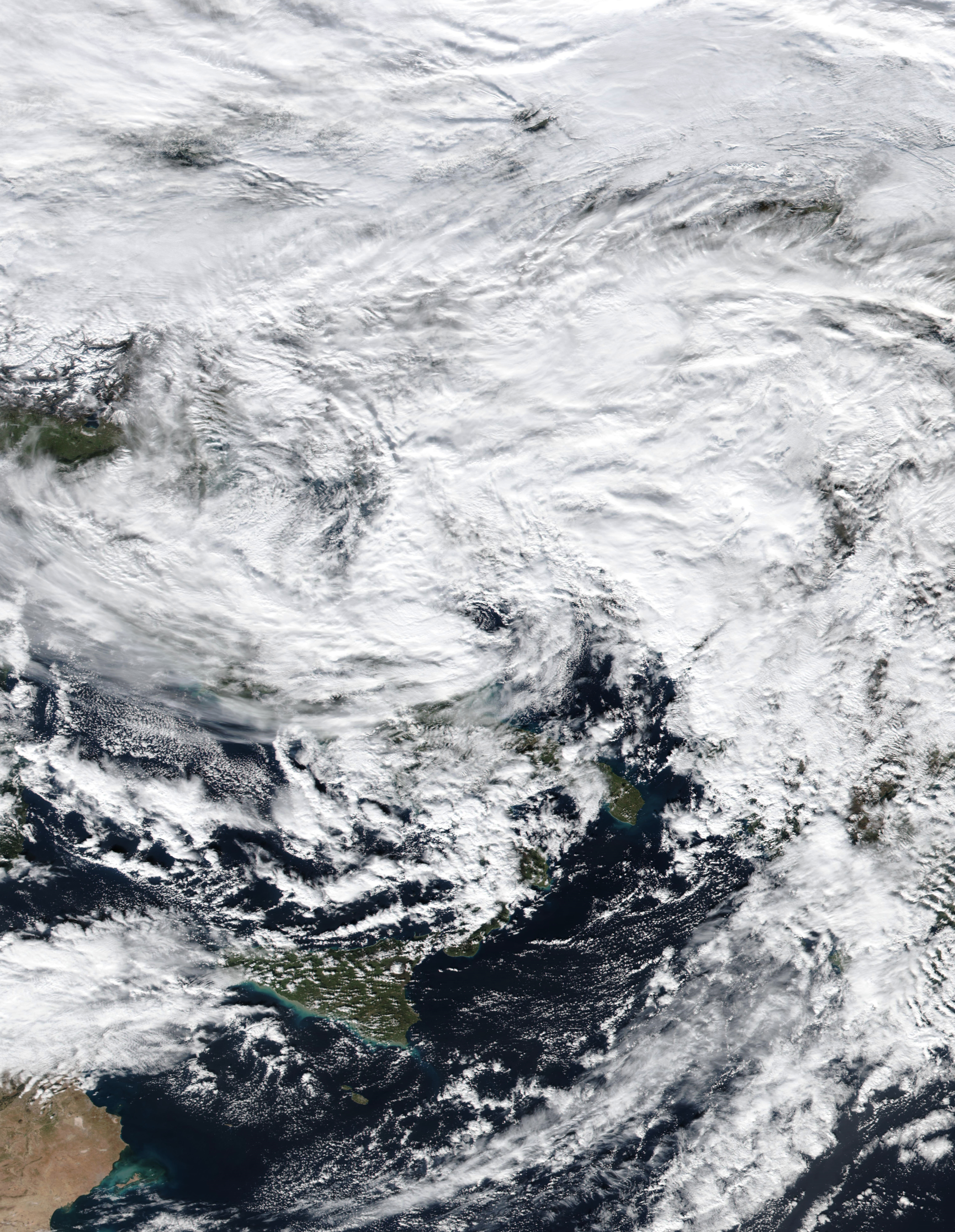
- Cyclone Hannelore on 21 January 2023

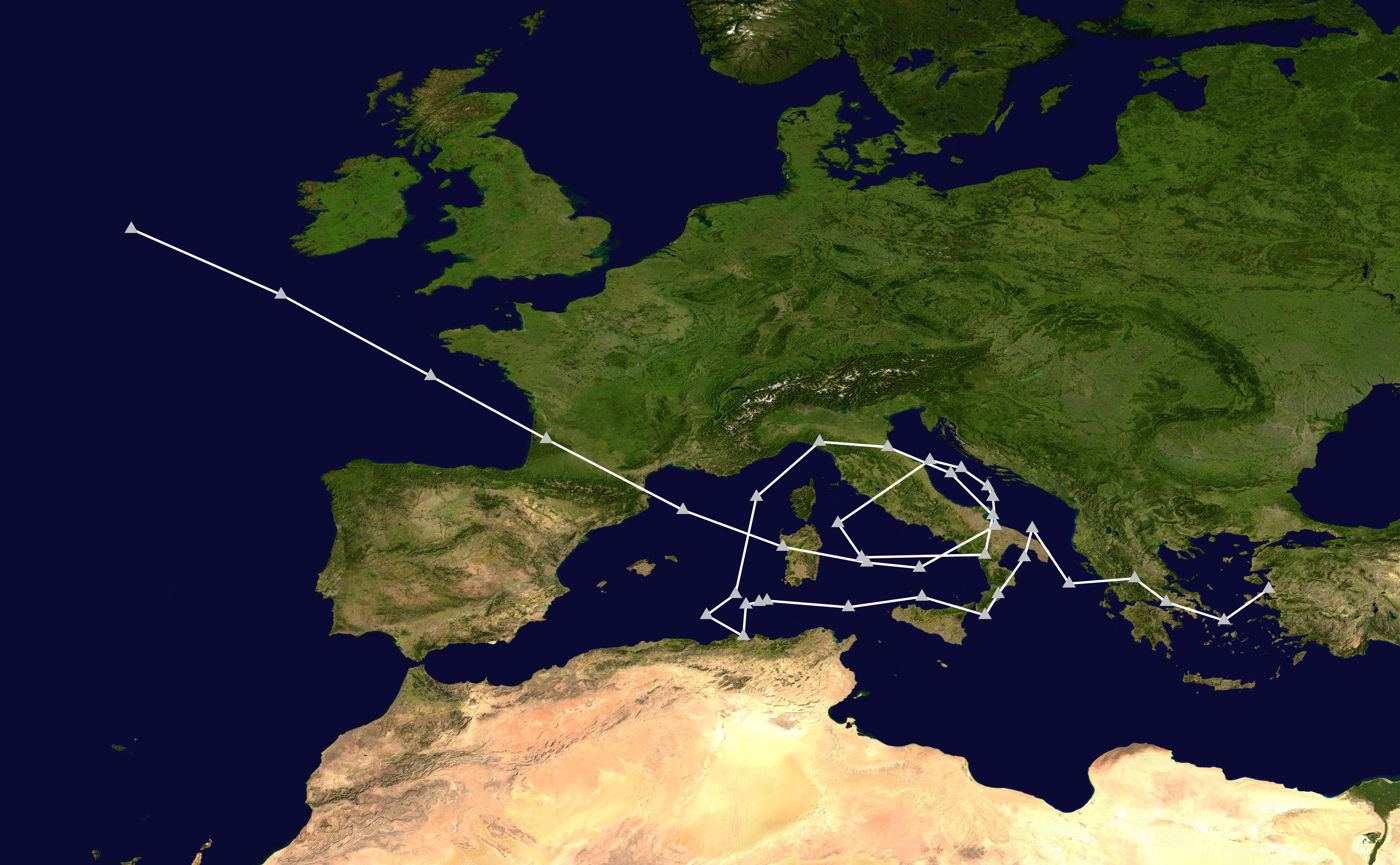
- Track of Cyclone Hannelore according to the University of Berlin
- Area affected: France, Spain, Italy, Croatia, Slovenia, Greece & Turkey
- Date of impact: 19 January 2023 – 28 January 2023
- Maximum wind gust: 151 km/h (94 mph) in Cap Béar (France)
- Lowest pressure: 992 hPa (29.29 inHg)
- Damage: Unspecified

Cyclone Hannelore was named on 19 January 2023. The storm was last noted on 28 January. According to the EUMETSAT, Hannelore was a Medicane. Météo-France has put 9 departments on orange alert in the south of the country, including Landes for "floods", and Dordogne, Lot, Tarn-et-Garonne, Aveyron, Tarn, Hérault, Aude and the Pyrénées-Orientales for "snow-ice". A Tramontana wind blew on the Mediterranean coast after its passage, with gusts of up to 106 km/h at Istres and 114 km/h at Cap Béar on 19 January. The winds continued over the following days, reaching peaks of 151 km/h at Cap Béar on 22 January. In the north-east of Spain subject to the same winds, the gusts reached 130 to 135 km/h from Huesca to the Balearic Islands.

Over northern Spain and in France, behind Hannelore, the arrival of a very cold and dry air mass from northern Europe caused minimum temperatures to drop well below freezing. A yellow vigilance "extreme cold" has even been launched for 72 departments in France and from yellow to orange for a good number of provinces in the north of Spain.

In Italy, heavy snow fell in the north of the country above 300 m altitude, accompanied by strong winds. Winds and snow also affected the Balkans.

=== Storm Barbara ===
Storm Barbara
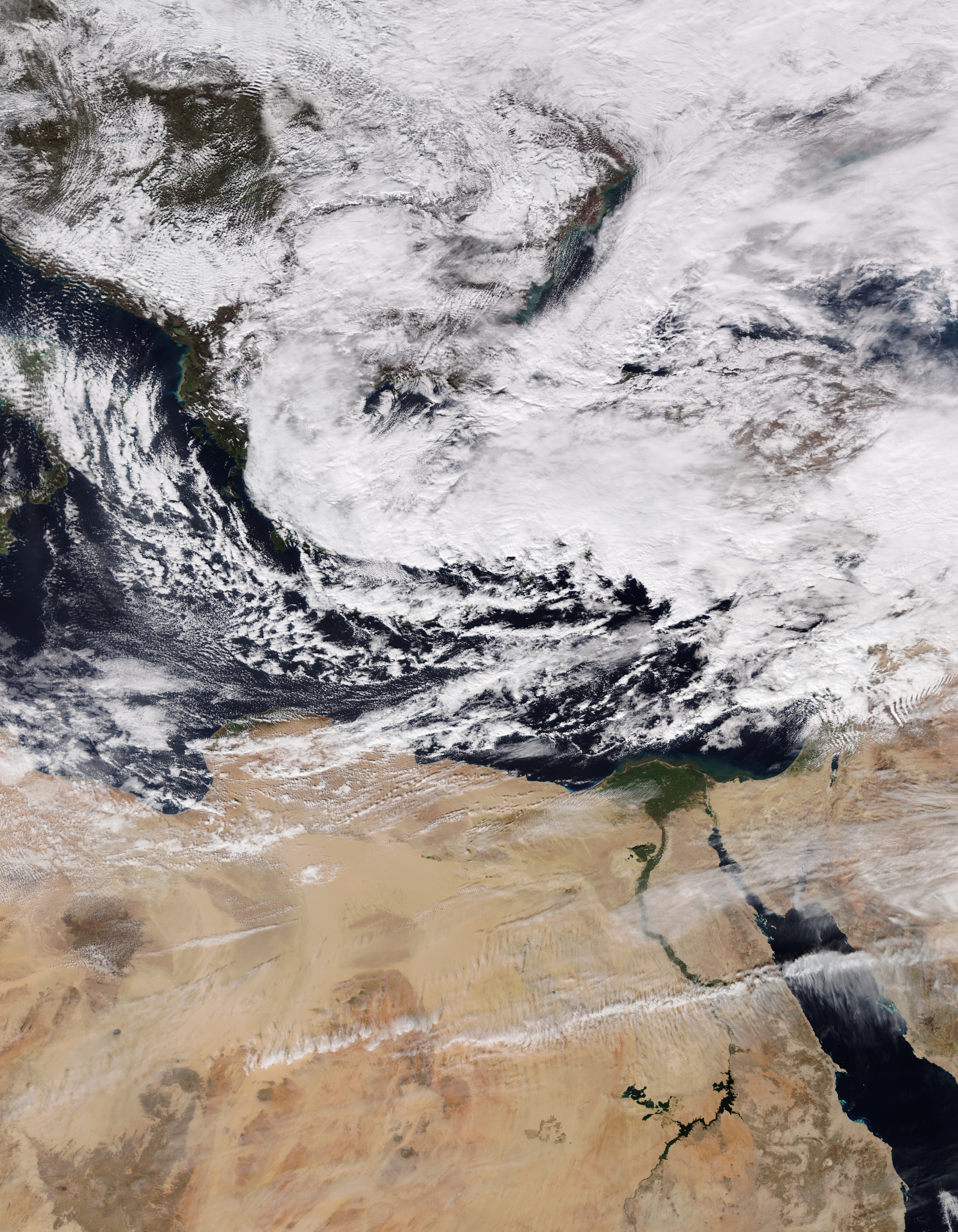
- Storm Barbara approaching Turkey on 5 February 2023

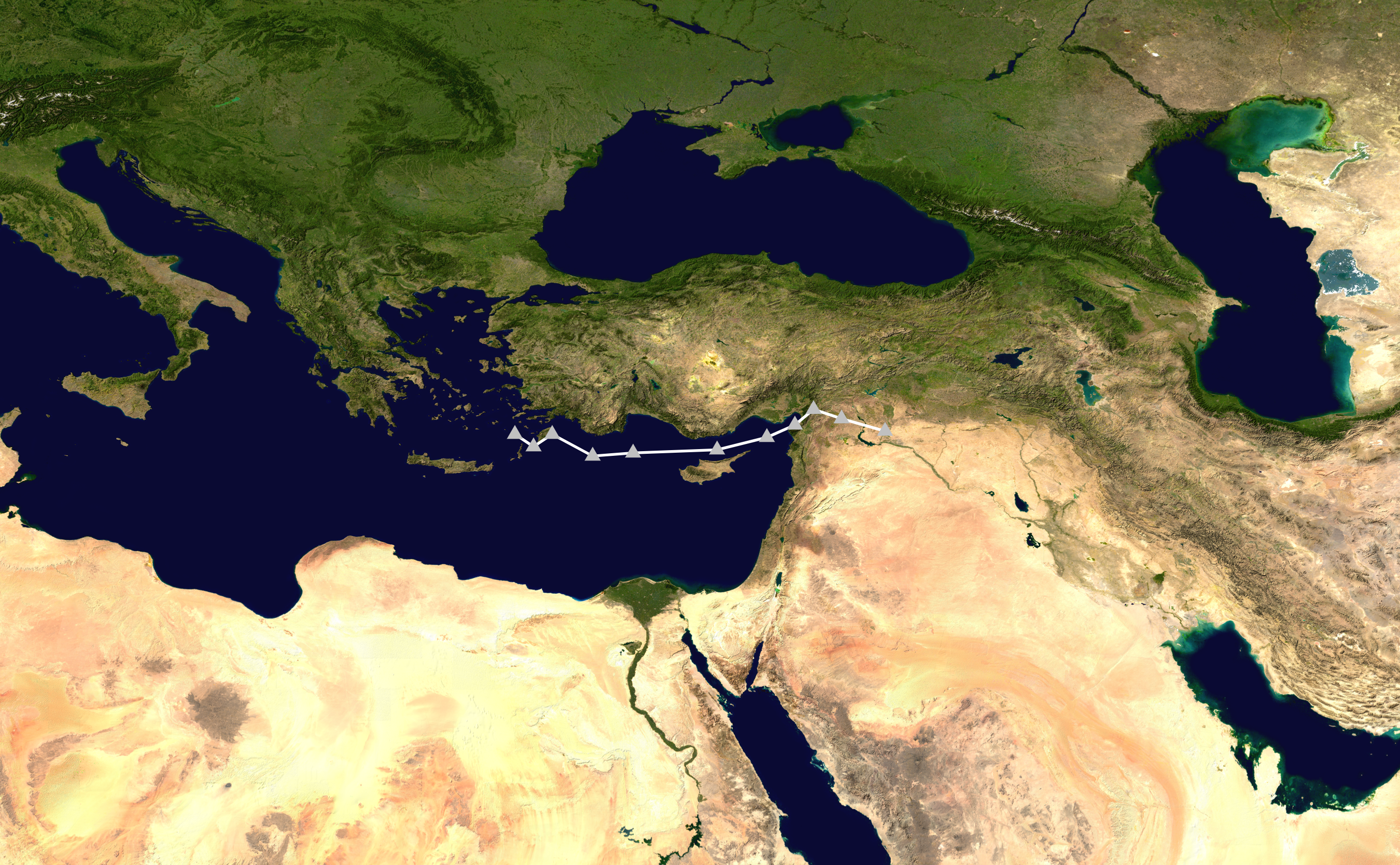
- Track of Storm Barbara according to the University of Berlin
- Area affected: Israel, Greece, Cyprus, Turkey & Syria
- Date of impact: 5–8 February 2023
- Maximum wind gust: Unspecified
- Lowest pressure: Unspecified
- Fatalities: 1
- Damage: Unspecified

Storm Barbara caused high winds in Israel that lasted until 8 February 2023, uprooting trees and sent flying debris, causing damage to buildings and cars. 1 fatality occurred when a 20-year-old construction worker was killed when scaffolding collapsed in Ashdod. In addition to the fatality, 5 injuries were also attributed to the storm.

The storm also hampered rescue efforts after the 2023 Turkey-Syria earthquake. The storm dissipated on 8 February 2023.

=== Storm Isaack ===
Storm Isaack
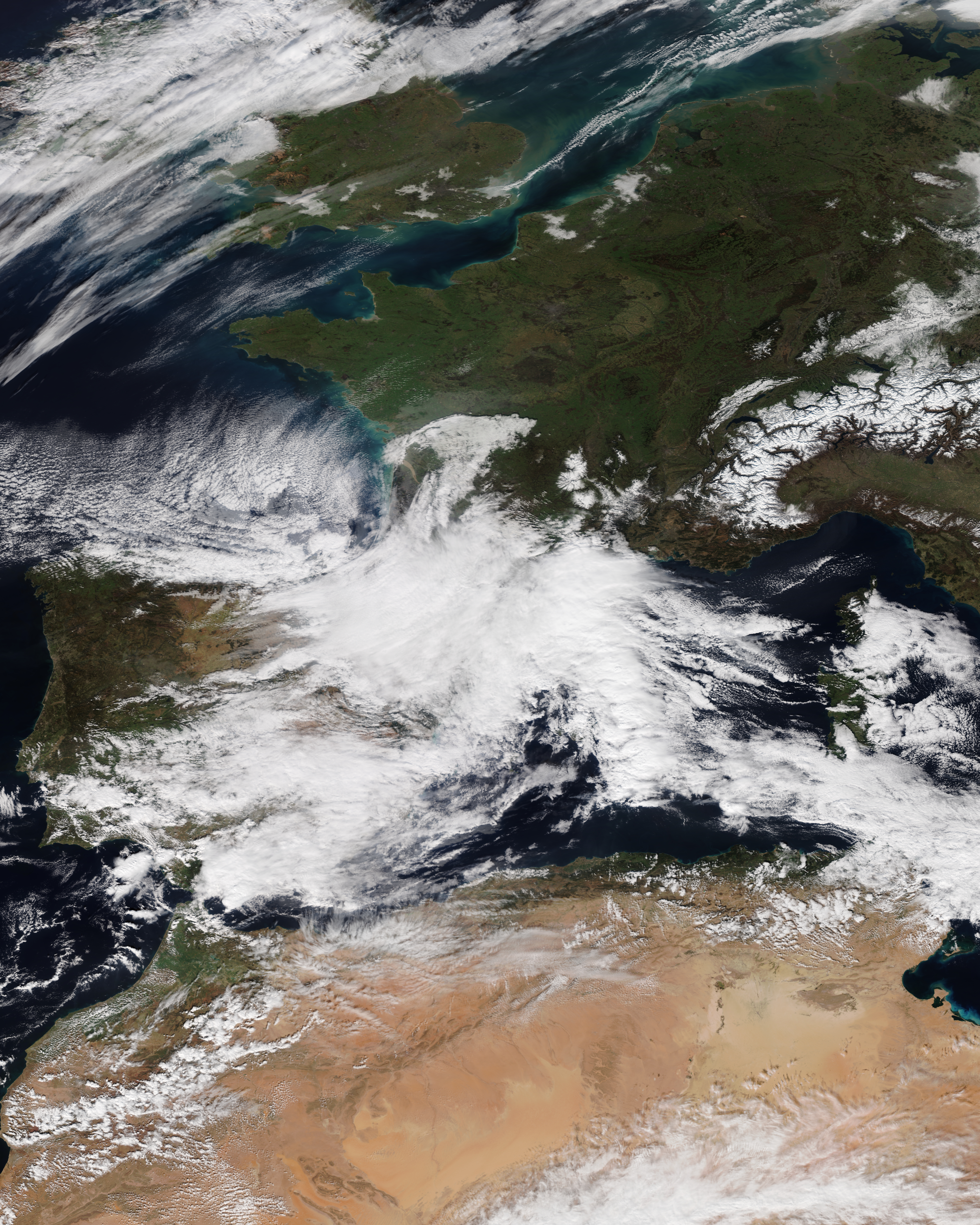
- Storm Issack on 7 February 2023

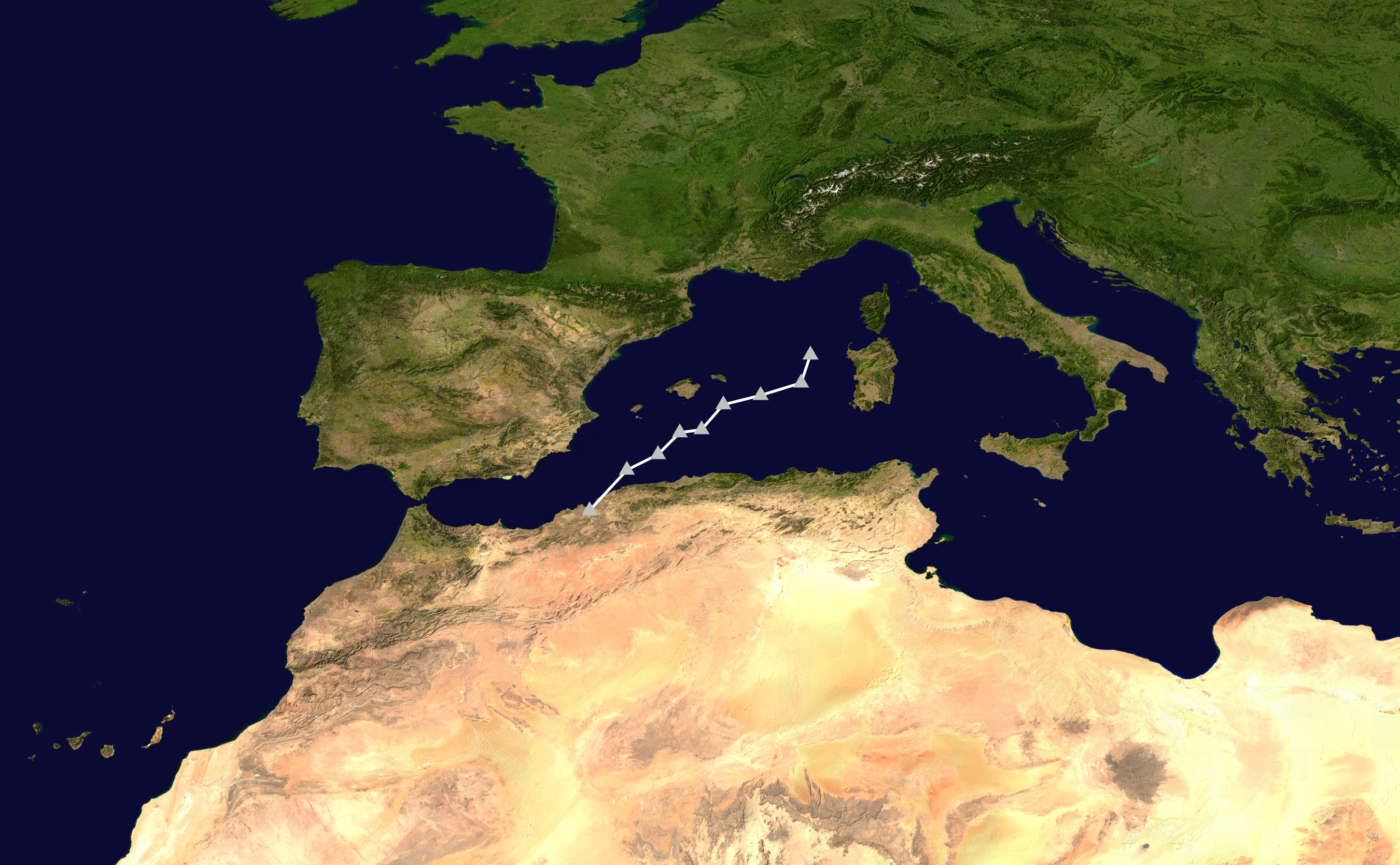
- Track of Storm Isaack according to the University of Berlin
- Area affected: Spain
- Date of impact: 6–8 February 2023
- Maximum wind gust: Unspecified
- Lowest pressure: Unspecified
- Fatalities: None
- Damage: Unspecified

Storm Isaack was named on 6 February 2023 by the AEMET. The storm dissipated on 8 February 2023.

=== Cyclone Helios ===
Cyclone Helios
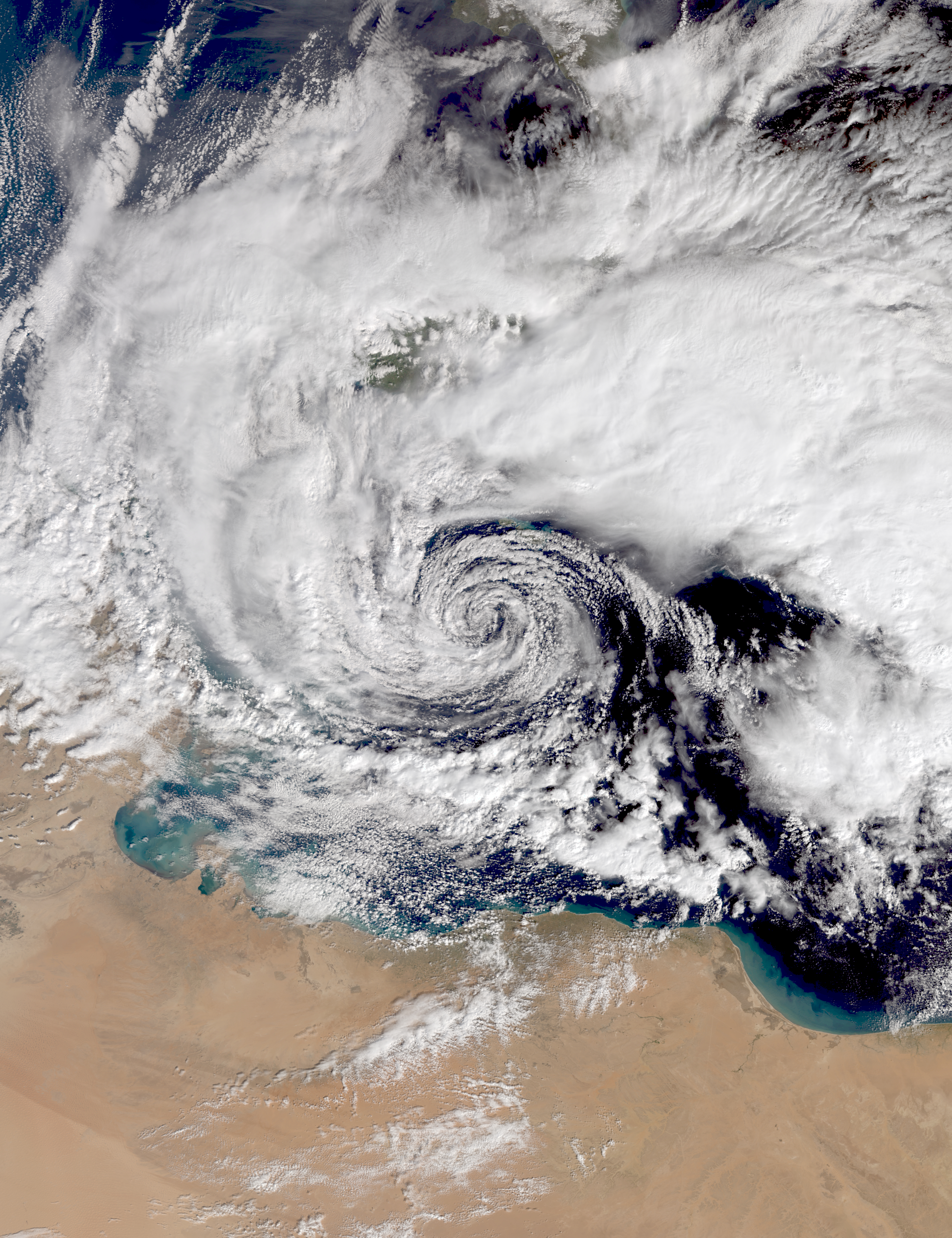
- Cyclone Helios on 10 February 2023

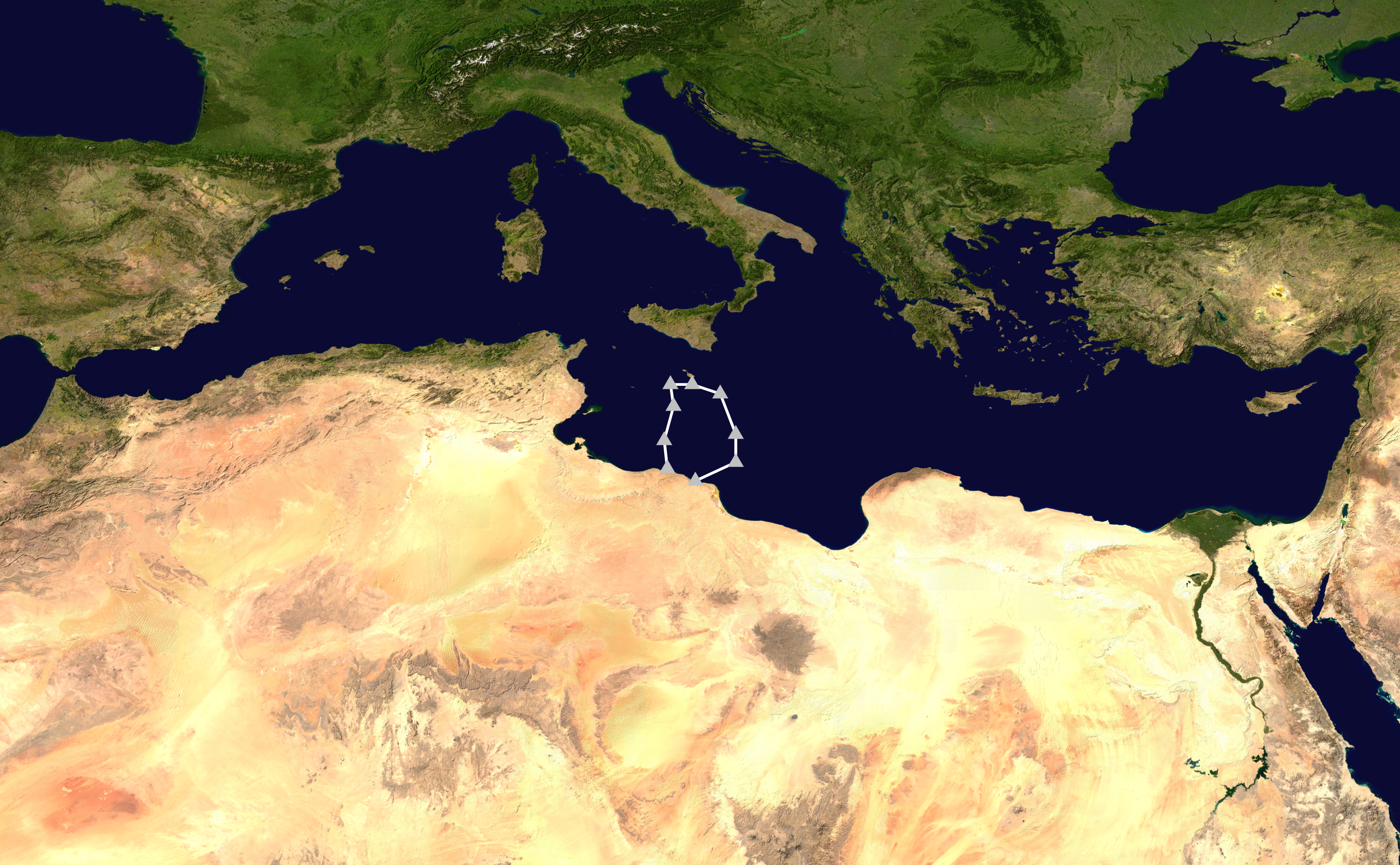
- Track of Storm Helios according to the University of Berlin
- Area affected: Sicily, Malta & Tunisia.
- Date of impact: 9–11 February 2023
- Maximum wind gust: Unspecified
- Lowest pressure: Unspecified
- Fatalities: None
- Damage: Moderate

Cyclone Helios was named by the Malta Meteorological Office on 9 February 2023. The storm also impacted Sicily, where it led to the closure of Catania–Fontanarossa Airport. Yellow weather warnings were issued for Malta. As a result, people in Malta were advised to avoid the coasts as a result.

The storm caused flooding and it led to property damage throughout the Maltese Islands, including the collapse of a false ceiling at the Malta International Airport and a structure at Popeye Village being destroyed by a dislodged boulder. During the heavy rain, walls collapsed, damaging parked cars at Għarb and St. Paul's Bay, while the 17th-century Għajn Tuffieħa Tower was also damaged. Some boats capsized and a yacht ran aground at Mistra Bay. One minor injury was reported when an airport ceiling collapsed.

On 10 February 2023, Malta experienced its wettest February-day since 1938. A total of 140.4 millimeters was measured at Luqa.

The cyclone dissipated on 11 February.

=== Storm Otto (Ulf) ===
Storm Otto
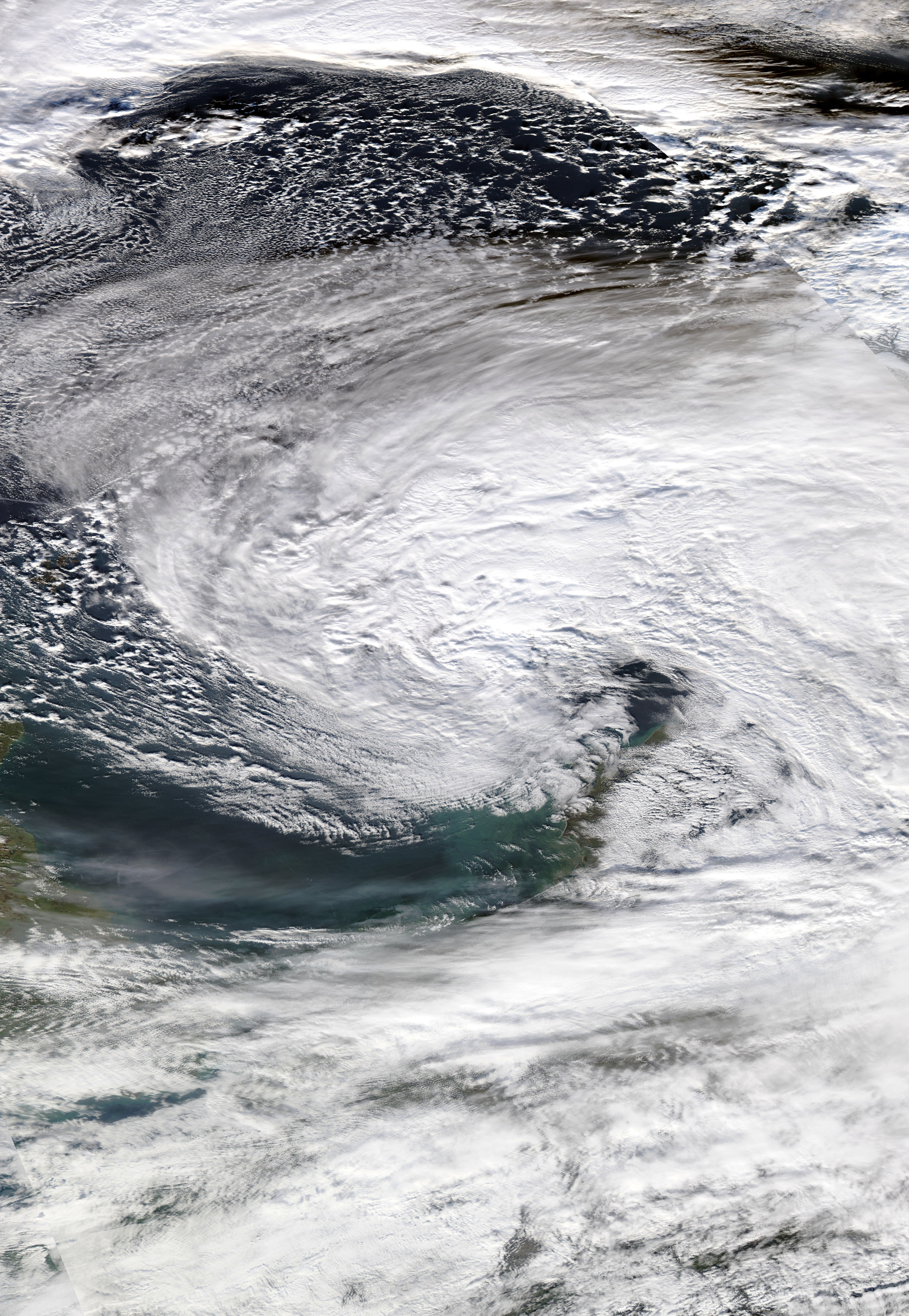
- Storm Otto impacting Norway on 17 February 2023

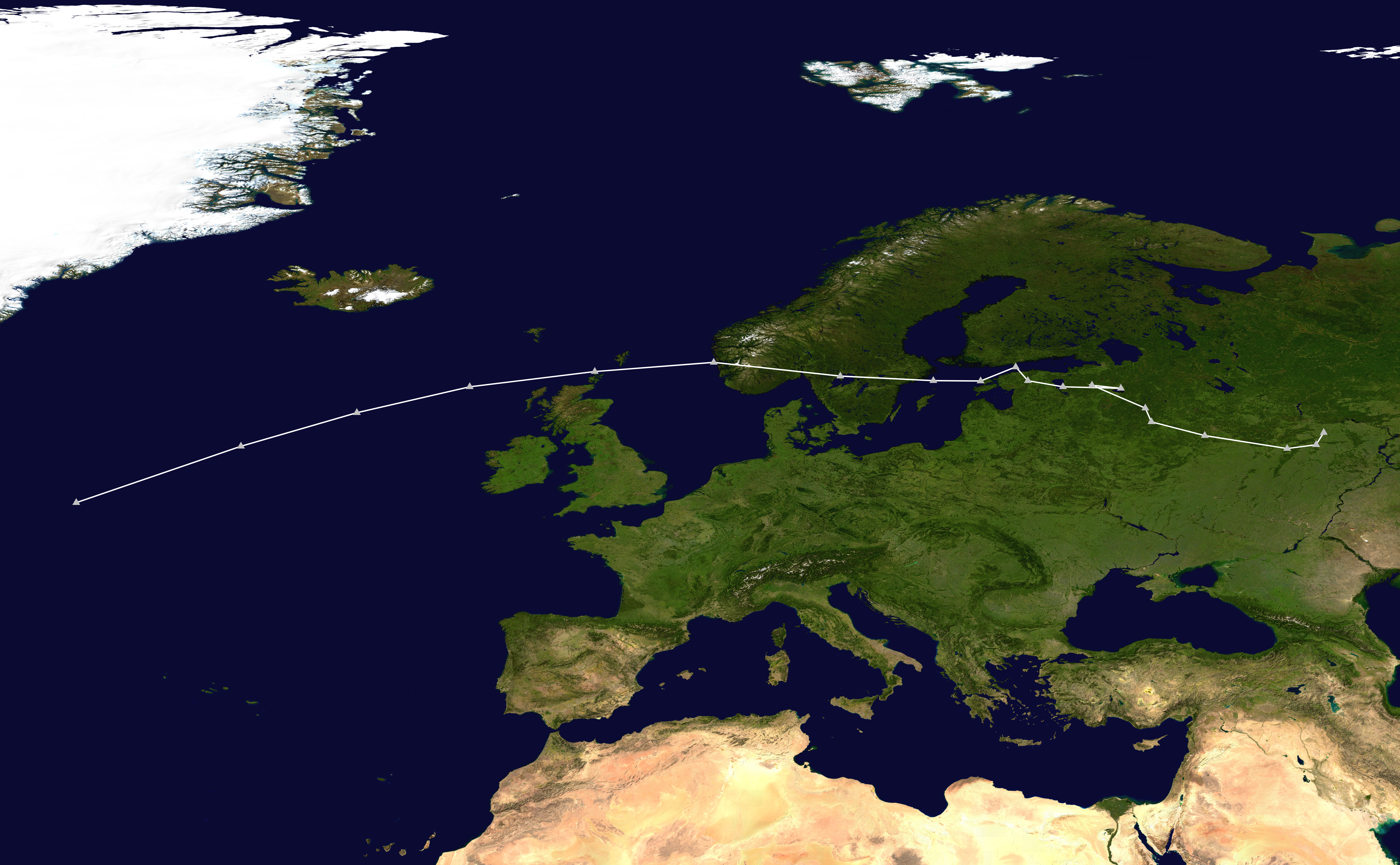
- Track of Storm Otto according to the University of Berlin
- Area affected: United Kingdom, Norway, Denmark, Faroe Islands, Sweden, Poland, Lithuania, Latvia, Finland, Estonia, Russia.
- Date of impact: 16–21 February 2023
- Maximum wind gust: 193 km/h (120 mph) at Cairngorms
- Lowest pressure: 977 hPa (28.9 inHg)
- Fatalities: None
- Power outages: 30,000 homes

Storm Otto was named by the Danish Meteorological Institute on 16 February 2023 and the UK's Met Office issued yellow warnings of wind in northern Scotland. Later, on 17 February 2023, the UK's yellow warning had been extended for the Borders and northeast England.

On 16 February, the Danish Meteorological Institute warned that Denmark could experience hurricane-force winds, and gusts of over 39 m/s (140 km/h).

On 17 February, wind gusts as high as 106 mph (171 km/h) were recorded on the north coast of Aberdeenshire. At higher elevations, a wind gust of 120 mph (190 km/h) was recorded on top of Cairngorm. The most severe conditions occurred northern Scotland, where a yellow wind warning was in place. The storm dissipated on 21 February.

Maximum wind gusts recorded during Windstorm Otto
Location	Wind gust	Elevation
Cairngorms, UK	193 km/h (120 mph); 53.6 m/s)	1,244 m (4,081 ft)
Aonach Mòr, UK	174 km/h (108 mph); 48.3 m/s)	1,221 m (4,006 ft)
Banff, UK	171 km/h (106 mph); 47.5 m/s)	47 m (154 ft)
Invergordon, UK	163 km/h (101 mph); 45.3 m/s)	4 m (13 ft)
Roeldalsfjellet, Norway	156 km/h (97 mph); 43.3 m/s)	1,006 m (3,301 ft)
Bealach na Bà, UK	154 km/h (96 mph); 42.8 m/s)	626 m (2,054 ft)
Elgol, UK	152 km/h (94 mph); 42.2 m/s)	104 m (341 ft)
Viewfield, UK	150 km/h (93 mph); 41.6 m/s)	18 metres (59 feet)
Eigerøya, Norway	146 km/h (91 mph); 40.5 m/s)	49 m (161 ft)
Brocken, Germany	137 km/h (85 mph); 38.1 m/s)	1,135 m (3,724 ft)
Lindesnes Fyr, Norway	133 km/h (83 mph); 36.9 m/s)	16 m (52 ft)
Kap Arkona, Germany	120 km/h (75 mph); 33.3 m/s)	42 m (138 ft)

=== Cyclone Juliette (Zakariyya) ===
Cyclone Juliette
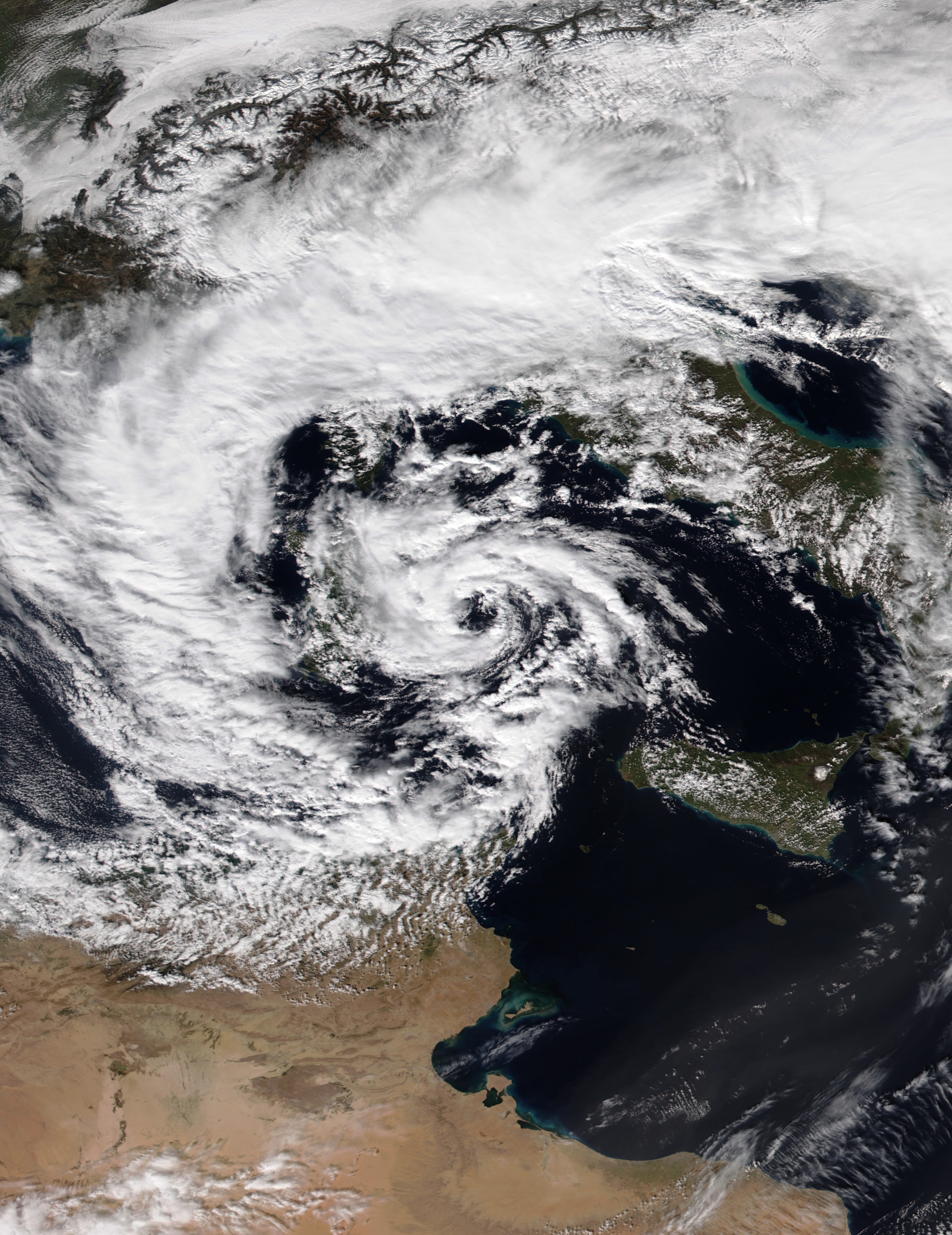
- Storm Juliette on 1 March 2023

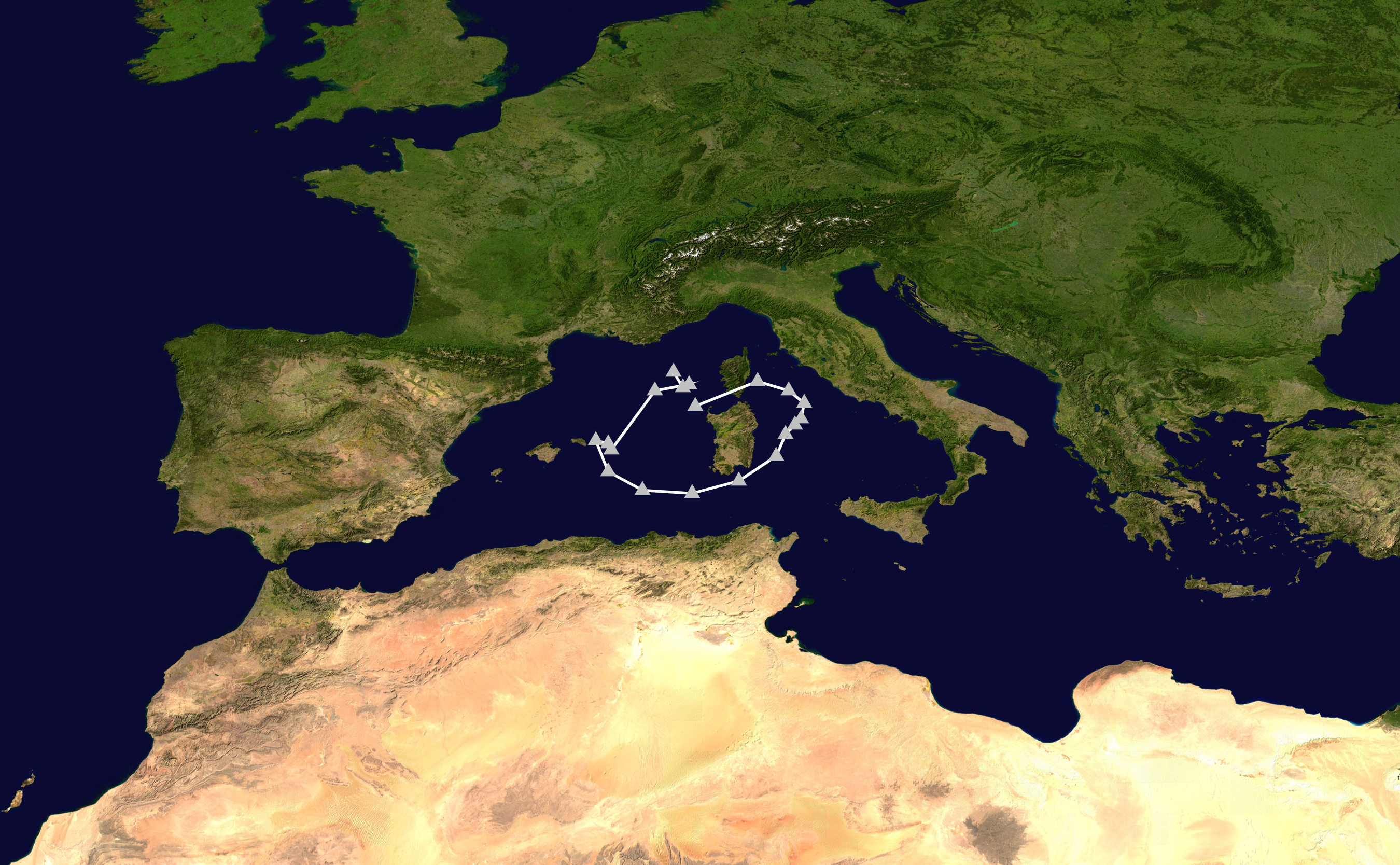
- Track of Storm Juliette according to University of Berlin
- Area affected: Italy, Spain, France
- Date of impact: 27 February 2023 – 4 March 2023
- Maximum wind gust: 114 km/h (71 mph) in S'Algar on 2 March
- Lowest pressure: Unspecified
- Fatalities: None
- Damage: Unspecified

Cyclone Juliette was named on 27 February 2023.

Heavy snow and large waves occurred in parts of Italy, Spain, and France, primarily Mallorca and the Belearic Islands.

It was also named Zakariyya.

=== Storm Kamiel ===
Storm Kamiel
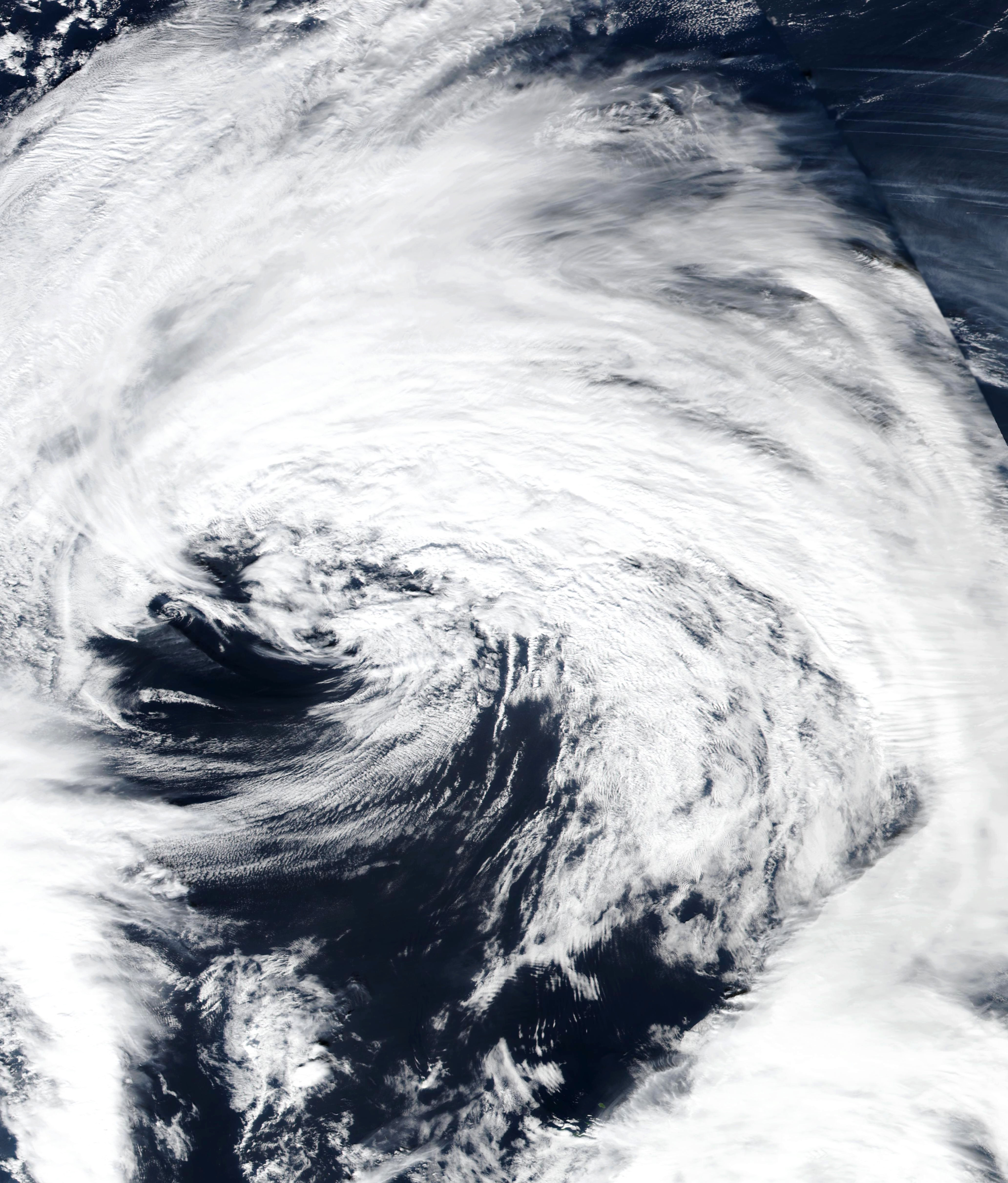
- Area affected: The Azores
- Date of impact: 27 February 2023 – 4 March 2023
- Maximum wind gust: Unspecified
- Lowest pressure: 967 hPa (28.56 inHg)
- Fatalities: None
- Power outages: Unspecified
- Damage: Unspecified

Storm Kamiel was named on 27 February 2023 by the IPMA.

=== Storm Larisa ===
Storm Larisa
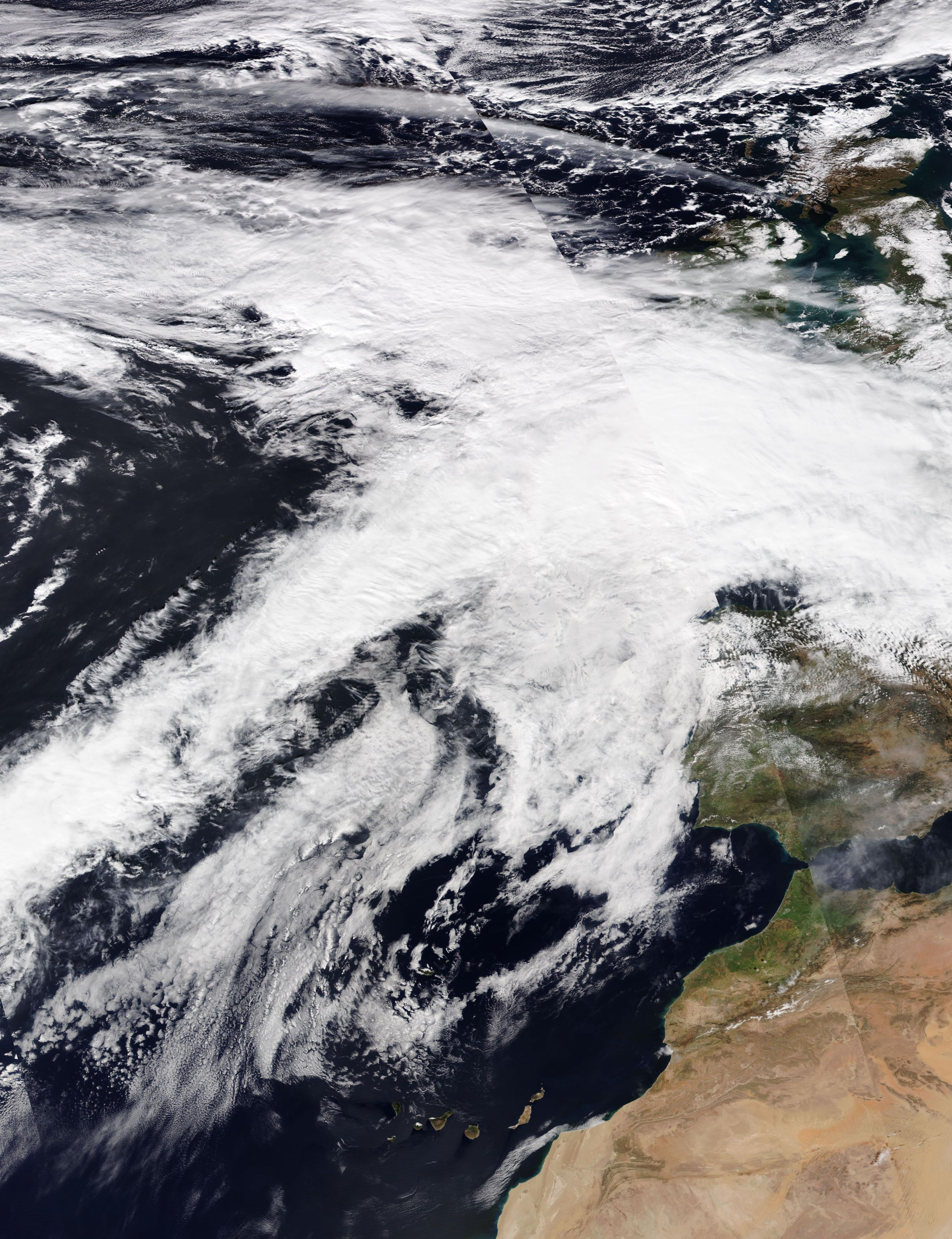
- Storm Larisa on March 10, 2023
- Area affected: France, Ireland, United Kingdom, Germany, Benelux.
- Date of impact: 8 March 2023 – 15 March 2023
- Maximum wind gust: 192 km/h (Cagnano, Corsica, France)
- Lowest pressure: 970 hPa (28.64 inHg)
- Fatalities: 0
- Power outages: Unspecified
- Damage: Moderate

On 7 March, the Free University of Berlin began tracking a major low pressure system in the middle of the North Atlantic called Diethelm. Its development took place along the polar front, within a barometric trough aloft. Its central pressure was around 970 hPa on 8 March. On 9 March, Météo-France officially gave it the name Larisa as it approached Ireland while extending a warm front towards Benelux. It passed over England and at 00:00 UTC on 10 March, the center of Larisa was over the English Channel, extending an intense pressure gradient over all of France and the Cantabrian Sea. Larisa then traveled through northern France, Benelux and Germany before arriving in central Europe on 11 March. The following day, the storm reached Finland and northwestern Russia before entering the Barents Sea on 13 March.

In France, eleven departments were placed on orange alert. Strong winds blew, in particular on the northern coasts, on the Massif Central and the Mediterranean coast. On 10 March, Météo-France reported gusts of 100 to 120 km/h over the country with gusts of up to 150 km/h in the Corbières. Keraunos, the French thunderstorm and tornado observatory, and Météo-France reported gusts of 146 to 150 km/h in Saint-Paul-de-Fenouillet (Pyrénées-Orientales) and 125 km/h in Mouthoumet in the Aude. Winds reached 130 km/h in Saint-Malo, and waves in Porspoder (Finistère) reached more than 16 meters. Up to 4,600 households were deprived of electricity in Brittany. Gusts of more than 100 km/h were also reported in Corsica, and up to 192 km/h in Cagnano and 154 km/h in Cap Sagro. Major wind damage was also reported in areas of maximum winds and the collapse of a wall in the commercial area of Dury, near Amiens in the Somme, injured two people.

In the United Kingdom, the Met Office issued a number of weather warnings for heavy snow followed by very cold temperatures. Snowfall of up to 24 cm was reported at Leek Thorncliffe, 14 cm at Bingley in northern England, and 16 cm at Lake Vyrnwy in Wales. A village on the outskirts of Buxton (Derbyshire) received at least 30 cm of snow according to an unofficial source. The winds also caused blizzard conditions causing widespread disruption to road and rail traffic as well as the closure of hundreds of schools. On the British M62 motorway, between Manchester and Leeds, motorists were stranded requiring the use of mountain rescue teams. Many flight delays and cancellations to clear snow from runways were reported at airports.

In Ireland, a warning was issued by Met Éireann for much of the country for freezing temperatures, widespread freezing on the roads, as well as a snowfall warning. In Northern Ireland, more than 180 schools closed, mainly in Belfast and counties Antrim, Armagh and Down.

Storm Larisa brought snowfall to Belgium and Netherlands between 8–10 March 2023, with layers of snow up to 10 centimeters.

In Spain on 8 March, warnings were issued for the Galician coast, predicting waves between 5 and 7 m in height. Warnings were extended until 10 March for the eastern Cantabrian Sea. The strongest gusts hit the Cantabrian coast, as well as mountainous areas in the north. The highest gust of 113 km/h was recorded at the Punta de Estaca de Bares, province of A Coruña, on 10 March. Rainfall was significant in the province of Cáceres, with a maximum of 59 mm in Piornal in 24 hours.

=== Storm Mathis (Markus) ===
Storm Mathis
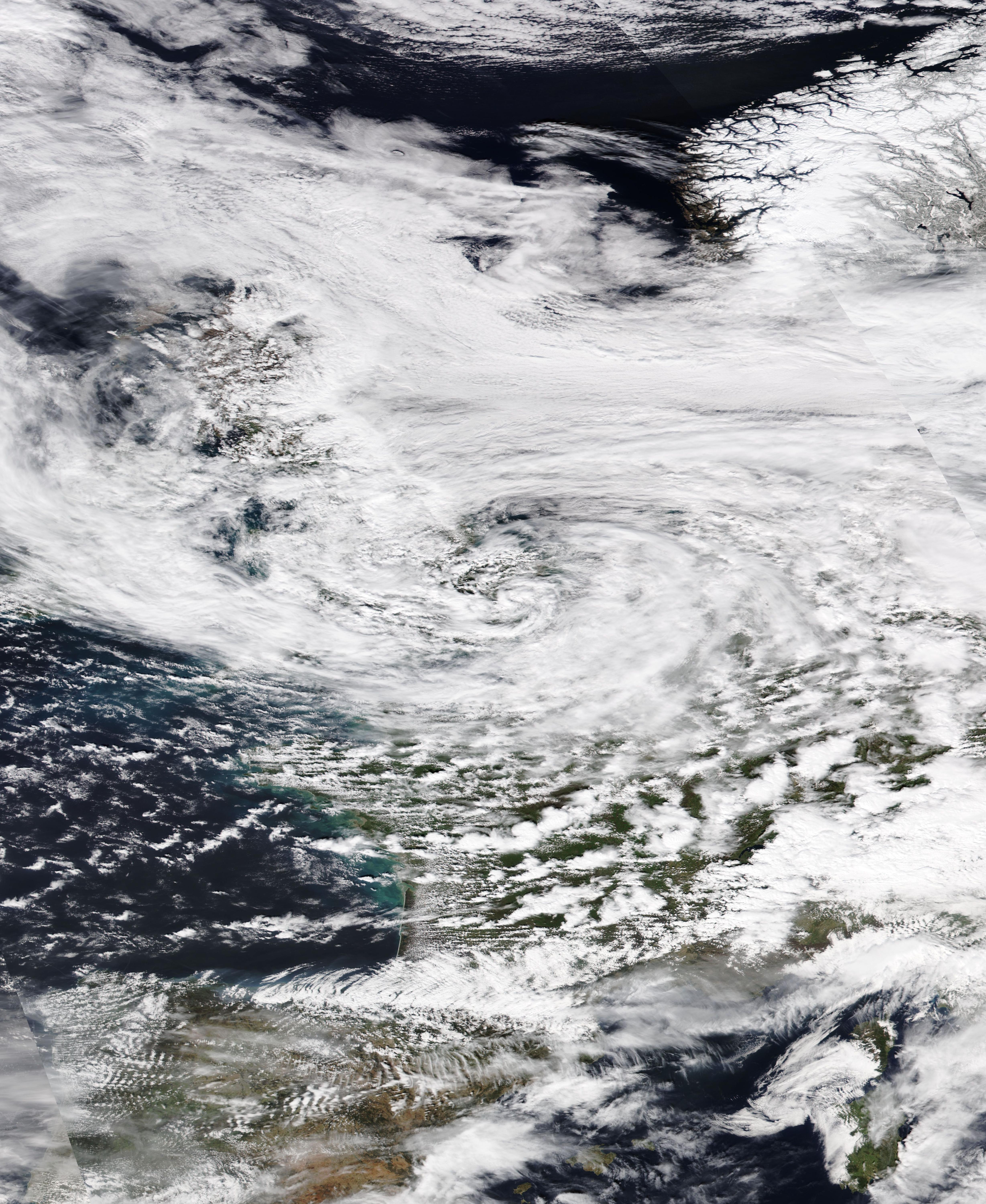
- Storm Mathis on 31 March 2023
- Area affected: France, United Kingdom
- Date of impact: March 30–2 April 2023
- Maximum wind gust: 150 km/h (93 mph)
- Lowest pressure: 979 hPa (28.91 inHg)
- Fatalities: 1
- Power outages: 500+
- Damage: Unspecified

Storm Mathis was named on 30 March 2023 by Météo France. Yellow wind and rain warnings were issued for southern England by the Met Office. Météo France issued yellow and orange storm alerts in 80 departments across the country.

On 31 March, a Welsh station recorded an onshore central pressure of 979 hPa (28.91 inHg). A gust of 93 mph (150 km/h) was also recorded at Gwennap Head in Cornwall. Over 500 properties were also left without power across the county. In Devon there were many flooded roads, with rivers and streams "reaching high levels". A man was killed by a falling tree in Senones, northern France. Two tornadoes were reported, one in Buzançais and another in Saint-Jean-de-Sauves, but no injuries were reported.

=== Storm Ilina (Norbert) ===
Storm Ilina
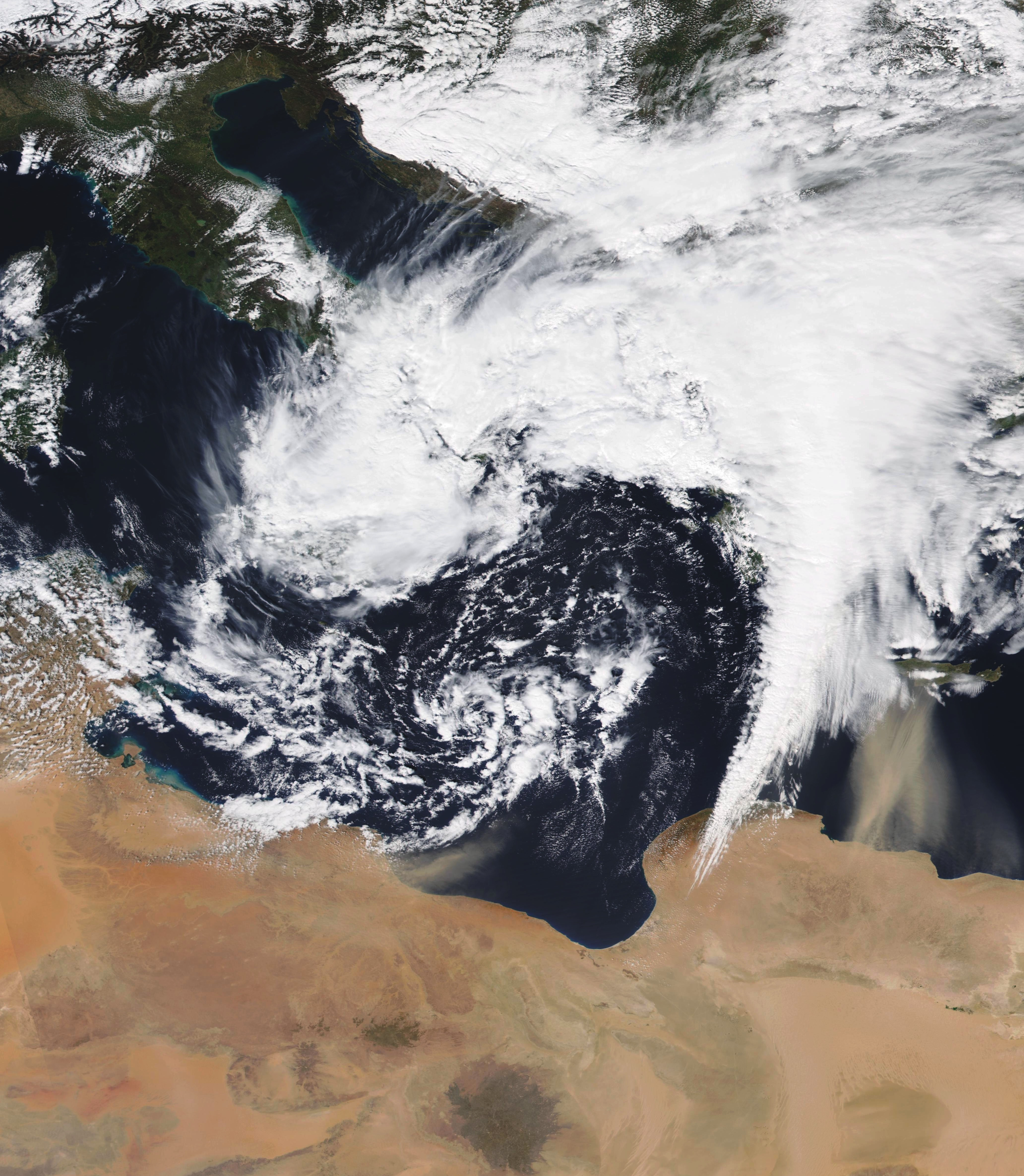
- Area affected: Italy, the Balkans, Poland
- Date of impact: 2 April 2023 – 8 April 2023
- Maximum wind gust: Unspecified
- Lowest pressure: 993 hPa (29.32 inHg)
- Fatalities: 0
- Power outages: Unspecified
- Damage: Unspecified

Storm Ilina was named on 2 April 2023.

=== Storm Noa (Quax) ===
Storm Noa
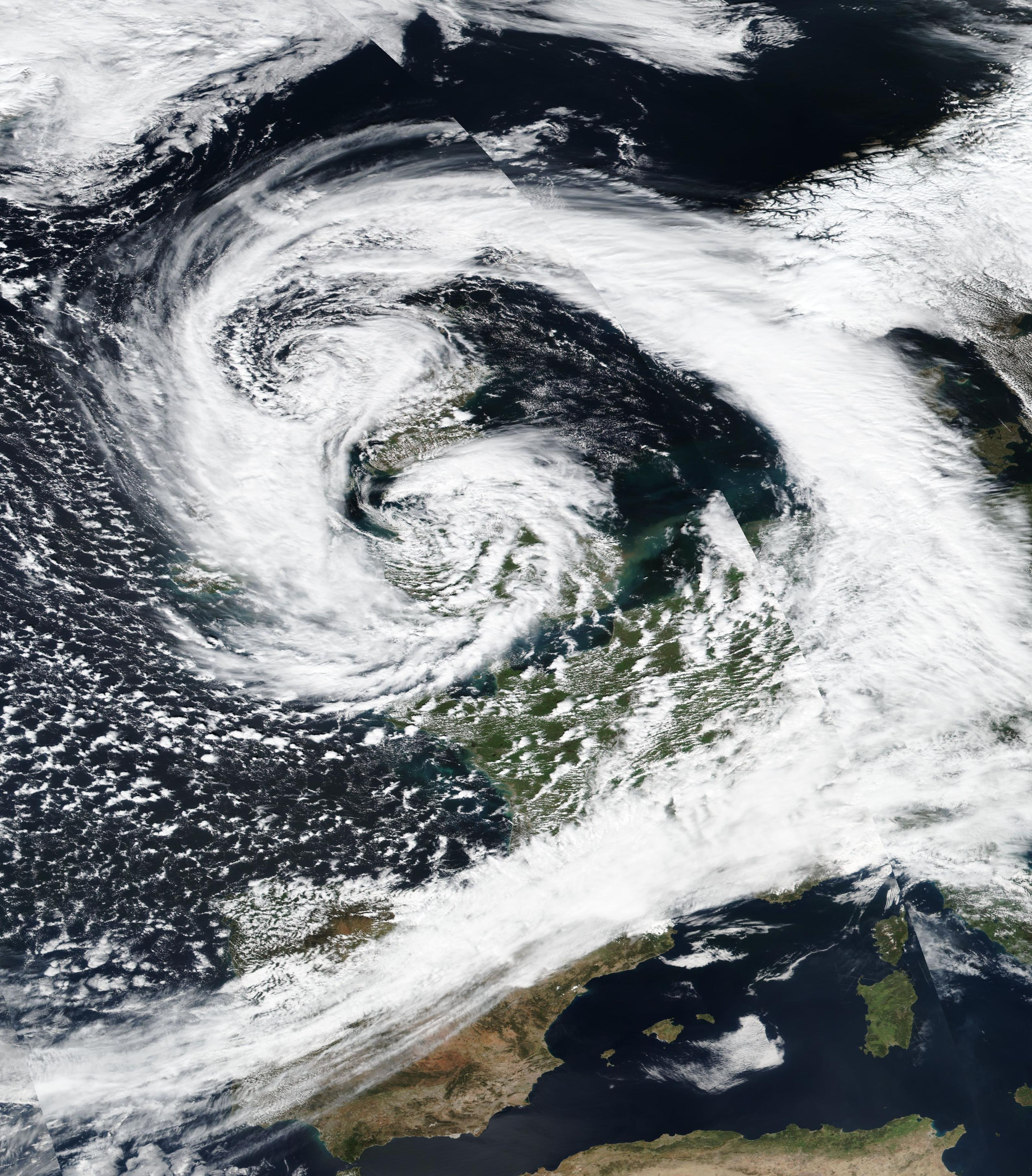

- Area affected: Benelux, France, Ireland, United Kingdom
- Date of impact: 11 April 2023 – 15 April 2023
- Maximum wind gust: 156 km/h (97 mph)
- Lowest pressure: 973 hPa (28.73 inHg)
- Fatalities: 2
- Power outages: Unspecified
- Damage: Unspecified

Storm Noa was named on 12 April 2023 by Météo France. Yellow wind warnings were issued for southern England and Northern Ireland by the Met Office, as well as Yellow and Orange warnings for wind in Ireland by Met Éireann. Furthermore, Météo France placed 3 departments in status orange for wind, as well as a status yellow wind warning for much of northern France – forecasting winds of up to 120 km/h (75 mph) in coastal regions of the Channel.

On 11 April, a woman died after being spotted in the sea off Brighton beach. On 13 April, the body of a 21-year-old man was recovered from Saltdean beach by the RNLI following an extensive search, which was prompted by the sighting of a person in the water near a groyne next to Brighton Pier. A woman was badly injured after scaffolding collapsed onto a street in Fareham. Waves of water also hit Cornwall.

Maximum wind gusts recorded during Windstorm Noa
Location	Wind gust	Elevation
Needles Old Battery, Isle of Wight, UK	156 km/h (97 mph)	120 m (390 ft)
Gwennap Head, Cornwall, UK	148 km/h (92 mph)	66 m (217 ft)
Prawle Point, Devon, UK	137 km/h (85 mph)	61 m (200 ft)
Isle of Portland, Dorset, UK	119 km/h (74 mph)	82 m (269 ft)

=== Storm Leon ===
Storm Leon
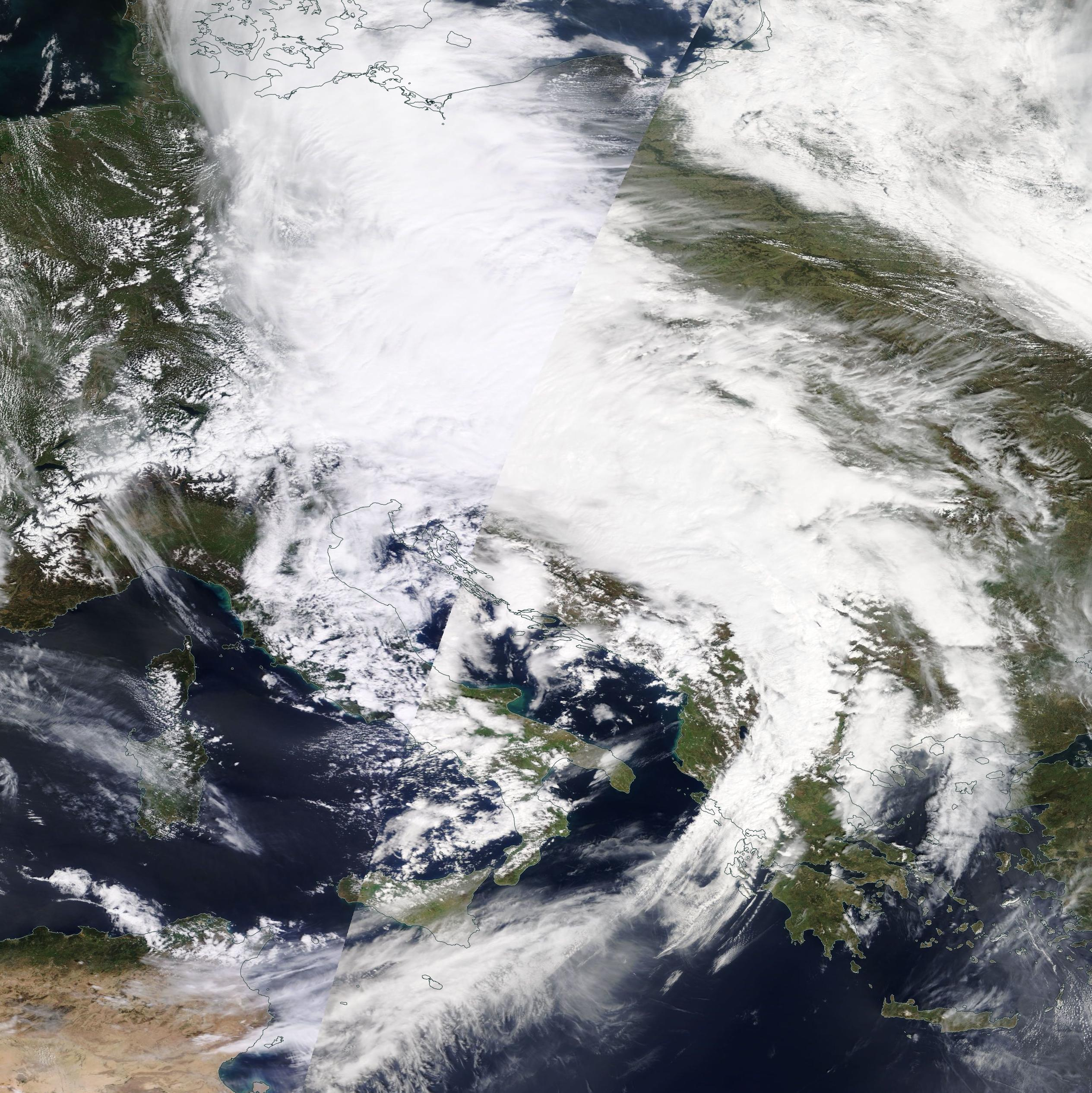
- Leon on April 14 at 0000 UTC
- Area affected: Italy, the Balkans, Poland, Germany
- Date of impact: 13 April 2023 – 16 April 2023
- Maximum wind gust: Unspecified
- Lowest pressure: 998 hPa (29.47 inHg)
- Fatalities: 0
- Power outages: Unspecified
- Damage: Unspecified

Storm Leon was named on 13 April 2023.

=== Storm Minerva (Chappu) ===
Storm Minerva (Chappu)
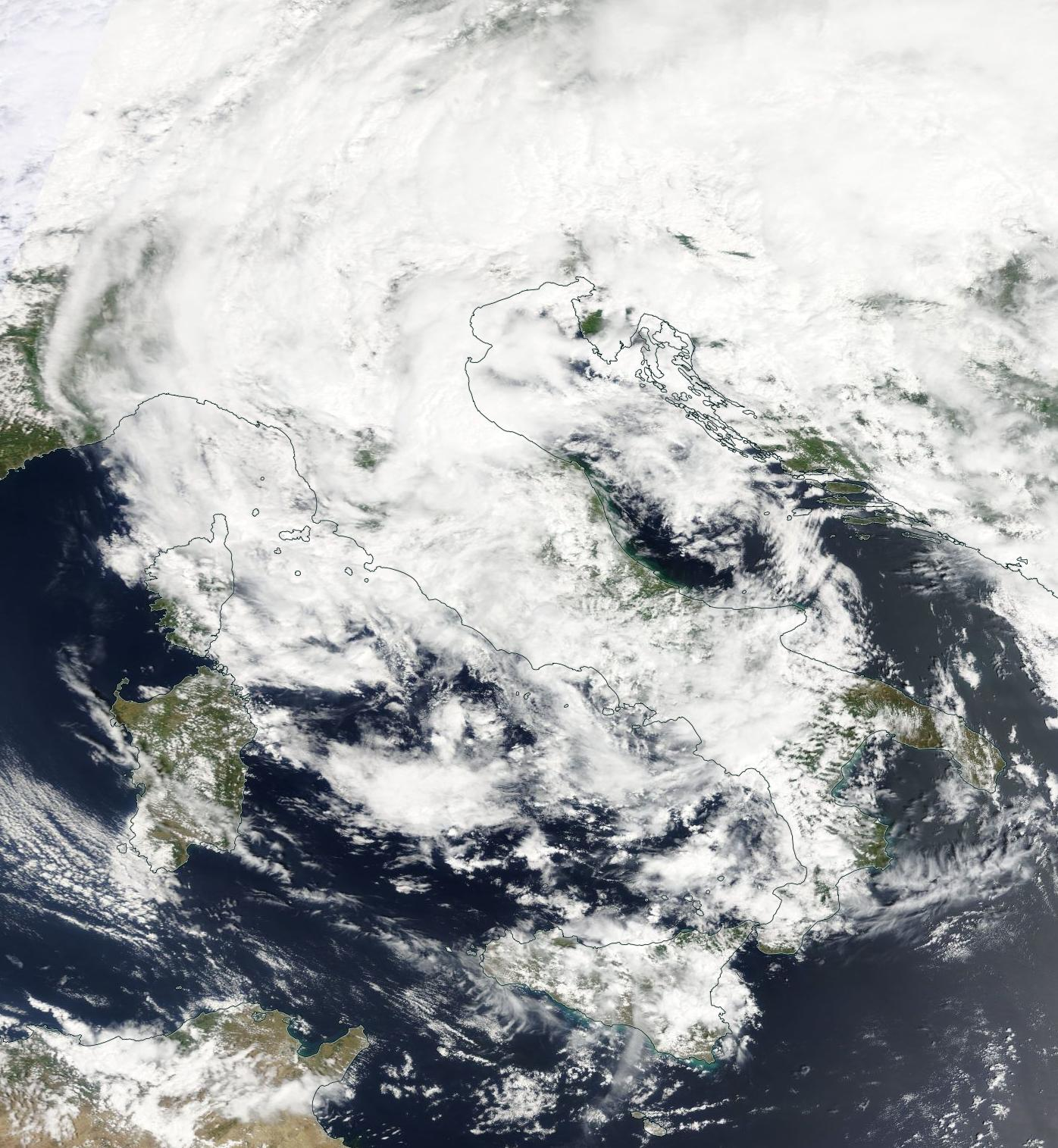
- Minerva over Italy on 16 May
- Area affected: Italy
- Date of impact: 15 May 2023 – 18 May 2023
- Maximum wind gust: Unspecified
- Lowest pressure: 994 hPa (29.35 inHg)
- Fatalities: 15
- Power outages: 50,000
- Damage: €10+ billion

Storm Minerva was named on 15 May 2023 by the Operational Center for Meteorology of the Italian Air Force. Also named Chappu by the Deutsche Wetterdienst and the Free University of Berlin, it was responsible for at least fifteen flood-related fatalities in the Emilia-Romagna region of Italy, with the worst affected areas being Forlì, Cesena, Faenza, Ravenna, Bologna and Rimini. The storm also forced the cancellation of the 2023 Emilia Romagna Grand Prix on 17 May.

=== Storm Nino ===
Storm Nino
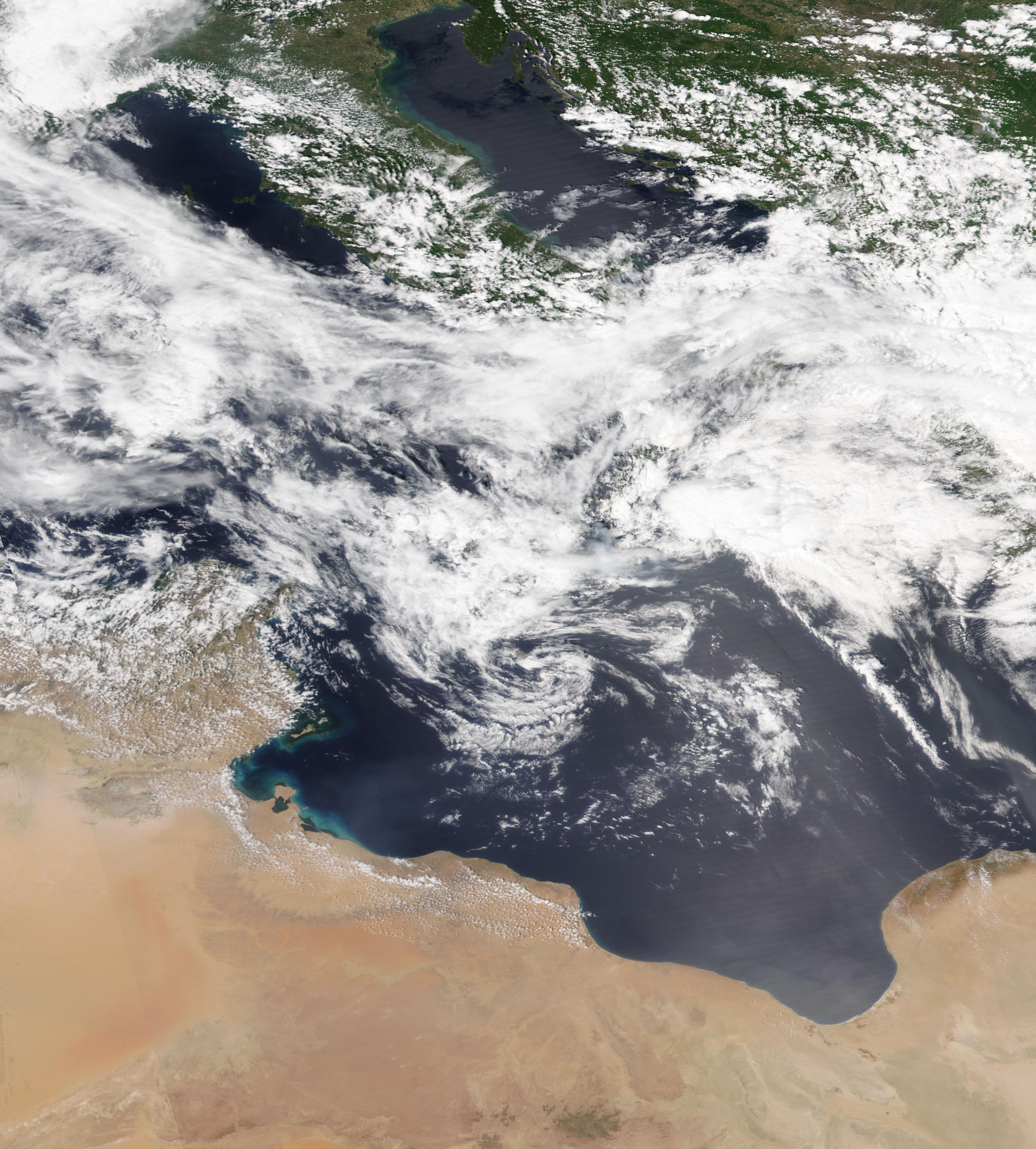
- Area affected: Italy, Tunisia, Malta, Algeria
- Date of impact: 18 May 2023 – 22 May 2023
- Maximum wind gust: 116 km/h (72 mph)
- Lowest pressure: 992 hPa (29.29 inHg)
- Fatalities: 1
- Power outages: Unspecified
- Damage: Unspecified

A weather station off the coast of Tunisia recorded a sea level pressure of 991.9 hPa (29.29 inHg) early on 19 May.

=== Storm Oscar ===
Storm Oscar
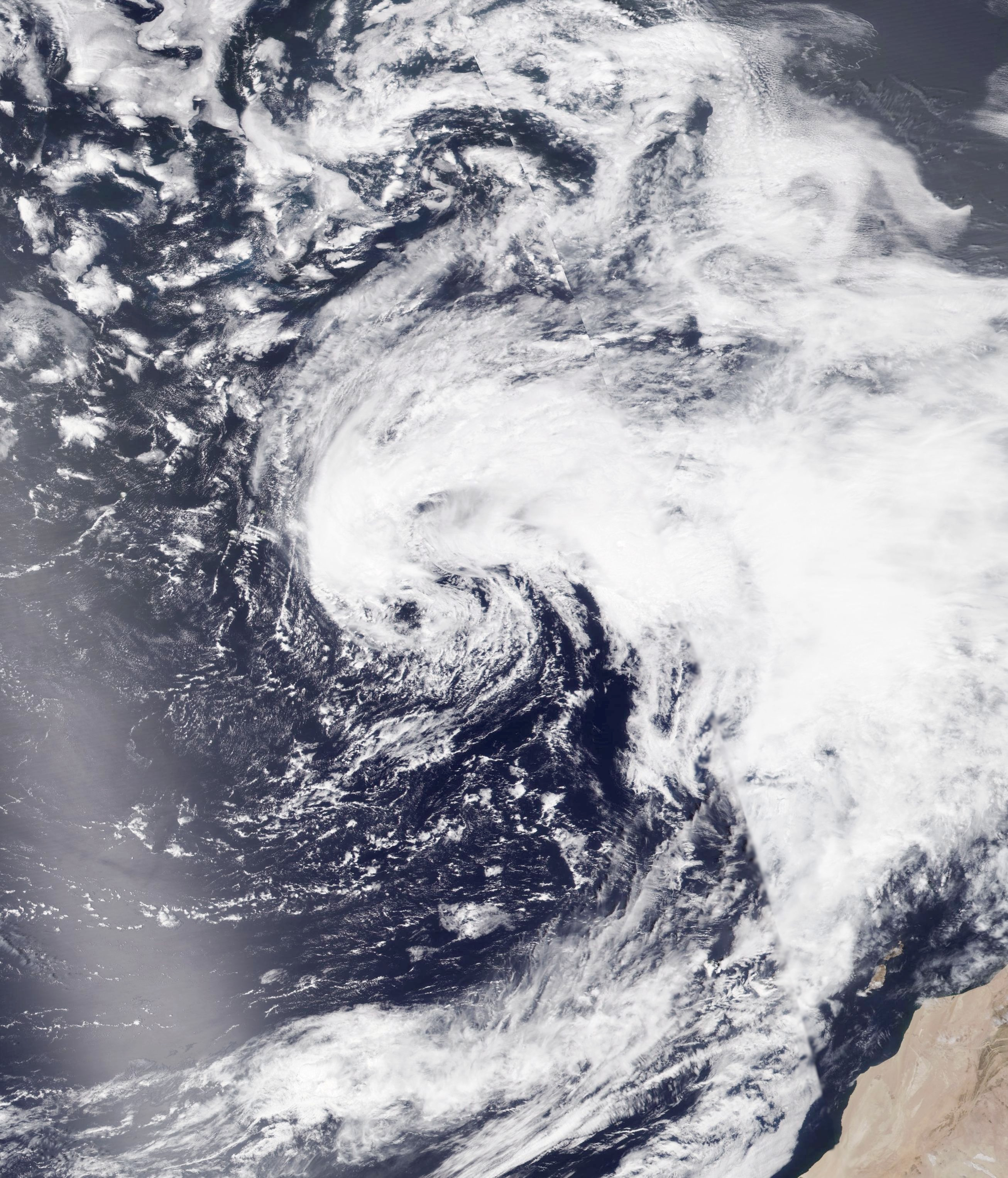
- Oscar on June 6, 2023.

- Area affected: The Azores, Iberia, Southern France and Italy
- Date of impact: 4 June 2023 – 12 June 2023
- Maximum wind gust: 90 km/h (56 mph)
- Lowest pressure: 991 hPa (29.26 inHg)
- Fatalities: 0
- Power outages: Thunder across all South Europe, West Europe, Balkans and East Europe, Floods in Italy
- Damage: Unspecified

=== Storm Olga ===
Storm Olga
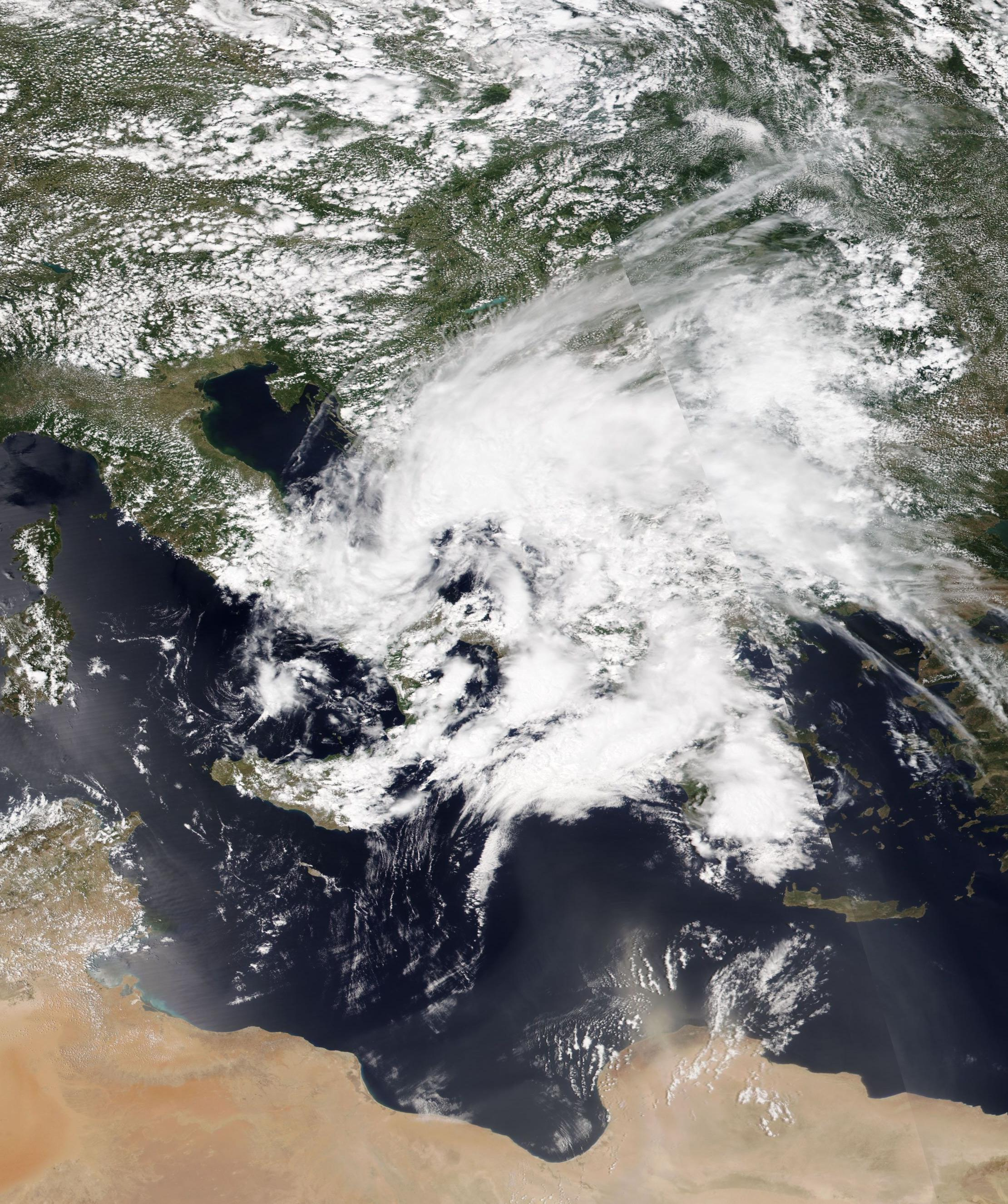
- Area affected: Italy
- Date of impact: 14 June 2023 – 16 June 2023
- Maximum wind gust: Unknown
- Lowest pressure: Unknown
- Fatalities: 0
- Power outages: Unknown
- Damage: Unspecified

Storm Olga was named by the Italian meteorological service on 14 June 2023.

=== Storm Poly ===
Storm Poly
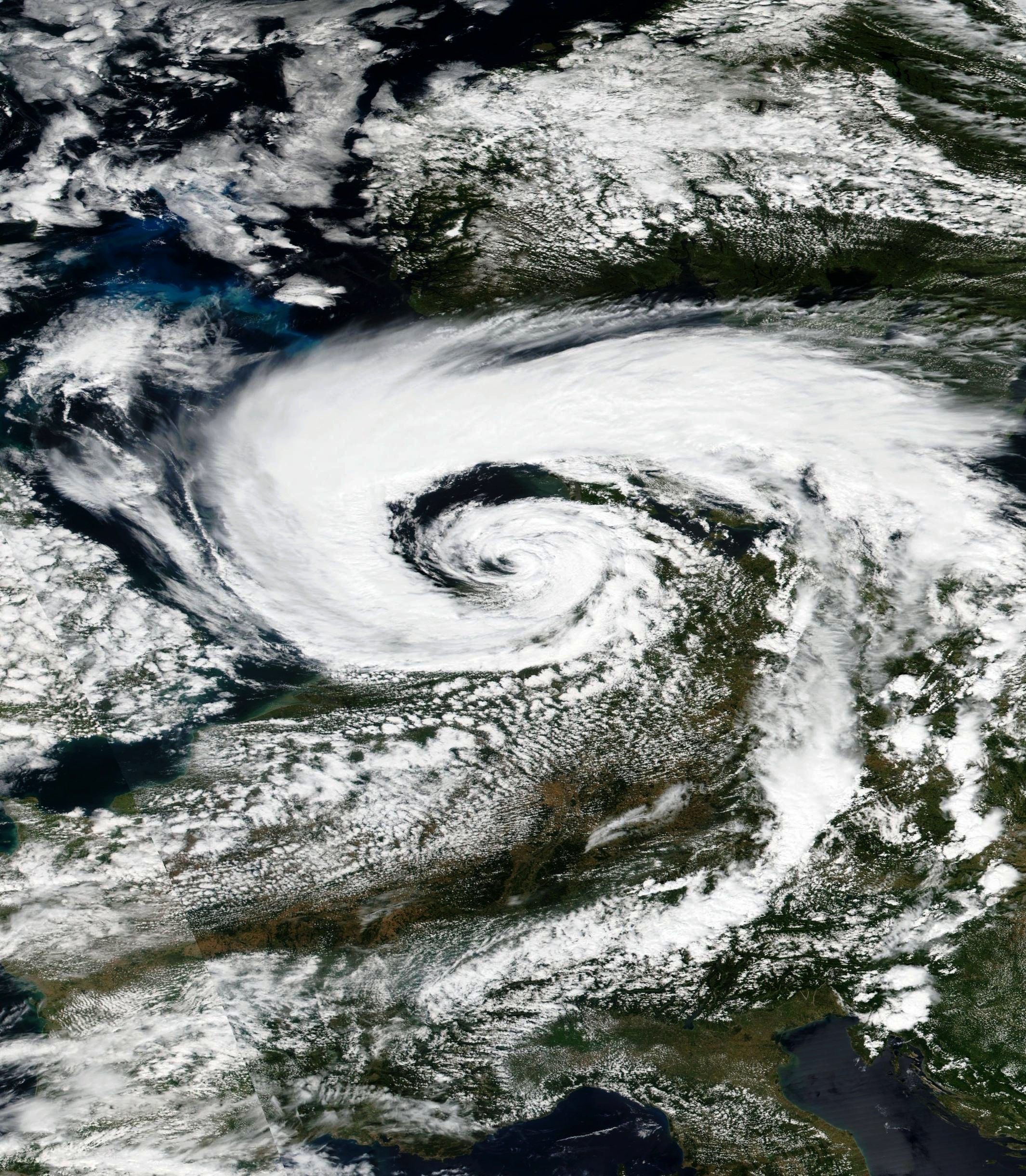
- Area affected: United Kingdom, Northern France, Belgium, Netherlands, Germany, Denmark, Sweden, Ireland and Norway
- Date of impact: 4 July 2023 – 7 July 2023
- Maximum wind gust: 146 km/h (91 mph), 41 m/s) in IJmuiden, Netherlands.
- Fatalities: 2
- Damage: Unspecified

Storm Poly was an extratropical cyclone which affected Benelux, Germany, and the United Kingdom during July 2023. The thirty-seventh windstorm of the 2022–23 European windstorm season, Poly was named by the Free University of Berlin on July 4. It later became the most intense summer storm to impact the Netherlands, bringing destructive gusts to the nation, peaking at 146 kilometres per hour (91 mph) in IJmuiden, Netherlands. In Germany, lesser winds of 80–97 kilometres per hour (50–60 mph) were recorded. In total, two fatalities occurred: one in the Netherlands, and another in Germany. Poly would cause at least €50,000,000 (2023) in damages.

=== Storm Patrícia (Xan) ===
Storm Patrícia
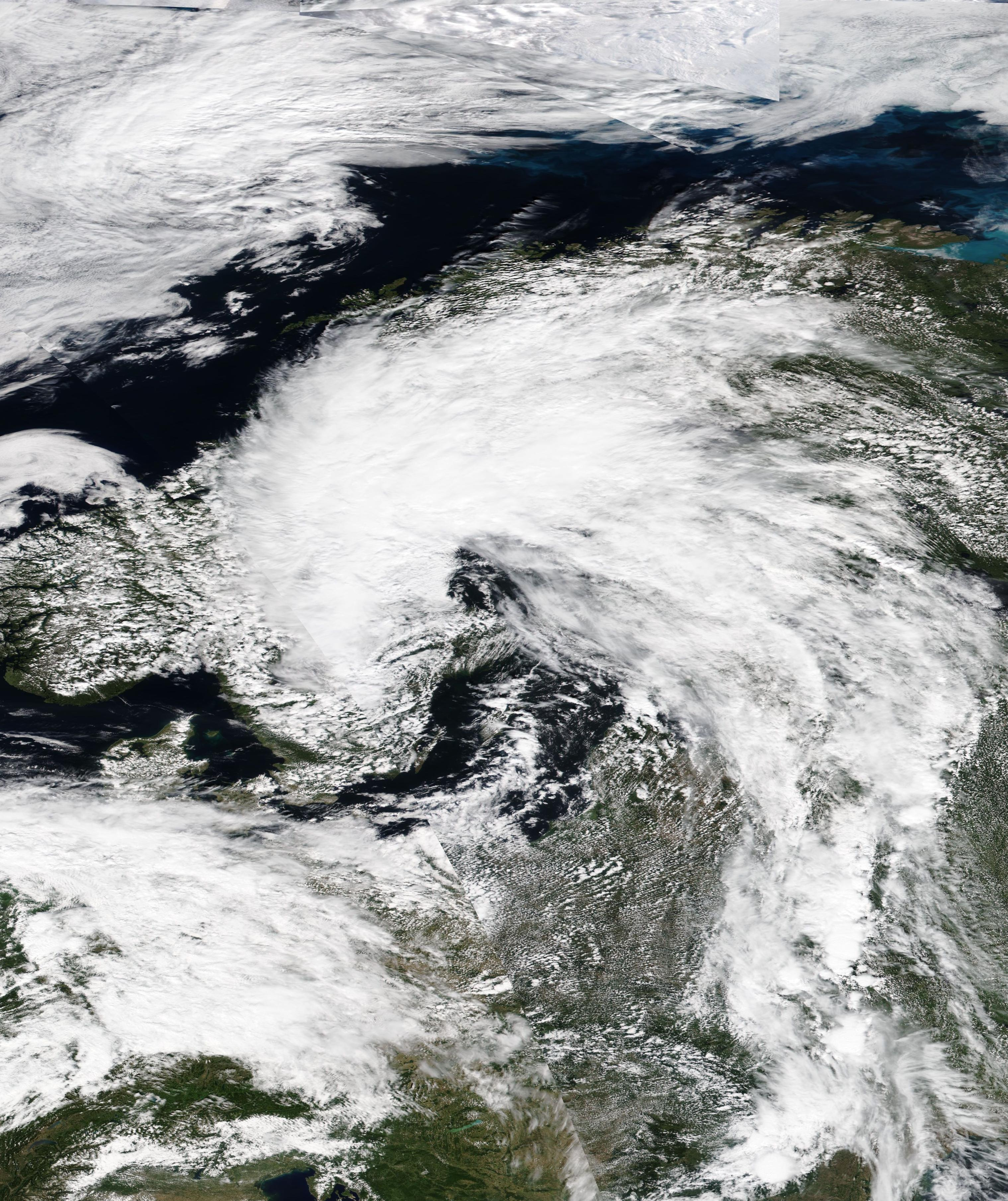
- Area affected: Ireland, United Kingdom, Netherlands, France, Belgium, Sweden
- Date of impact: 2 August 2023 – 5 August 2023
- Maximum wind gust: Unspecified
- Lowest pressure: 981 hPa (28.97 inHg)
- Fatalities: 0
- Power outages: Unspecified
- Damage: Unspecified

Storm Patrícia was named on 2 August 2023 by Meteo France, with the Deutscher Wetterdienst naming the same cyclone as Xan.

=== Storm Petar (Zacharias) ===
Storm Petar
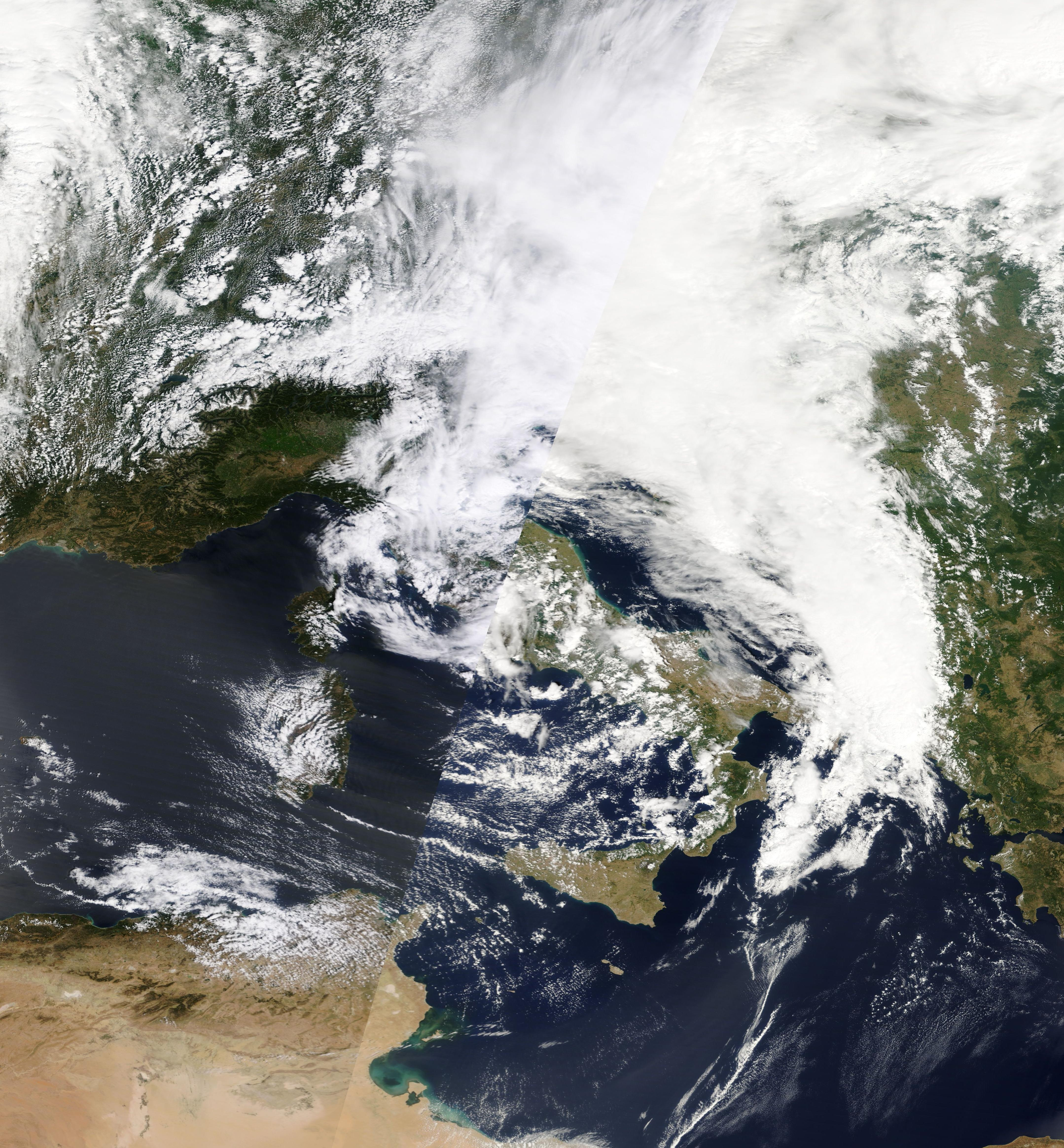
- Petar on 2023-08-05 at 0000Z.
- Area affected: Italy, Greece
- Date of impact: 4 August 2023 – 6 August 2023
- Maximum wind gust: Unspecified
- Lowest pressure: 1,002 hPa (29.59 inHg)
- Fatalities: 0
- Power outages: Unspecified
- Damage: Unspecified

Storm Petar was named on 4 August 2023. The system, which was also named Zacharias by the Deutscher Wetterdienst, formed in the Adriatic Sea.

=== Storm Antoni (Yves) ===
Storm Antoni
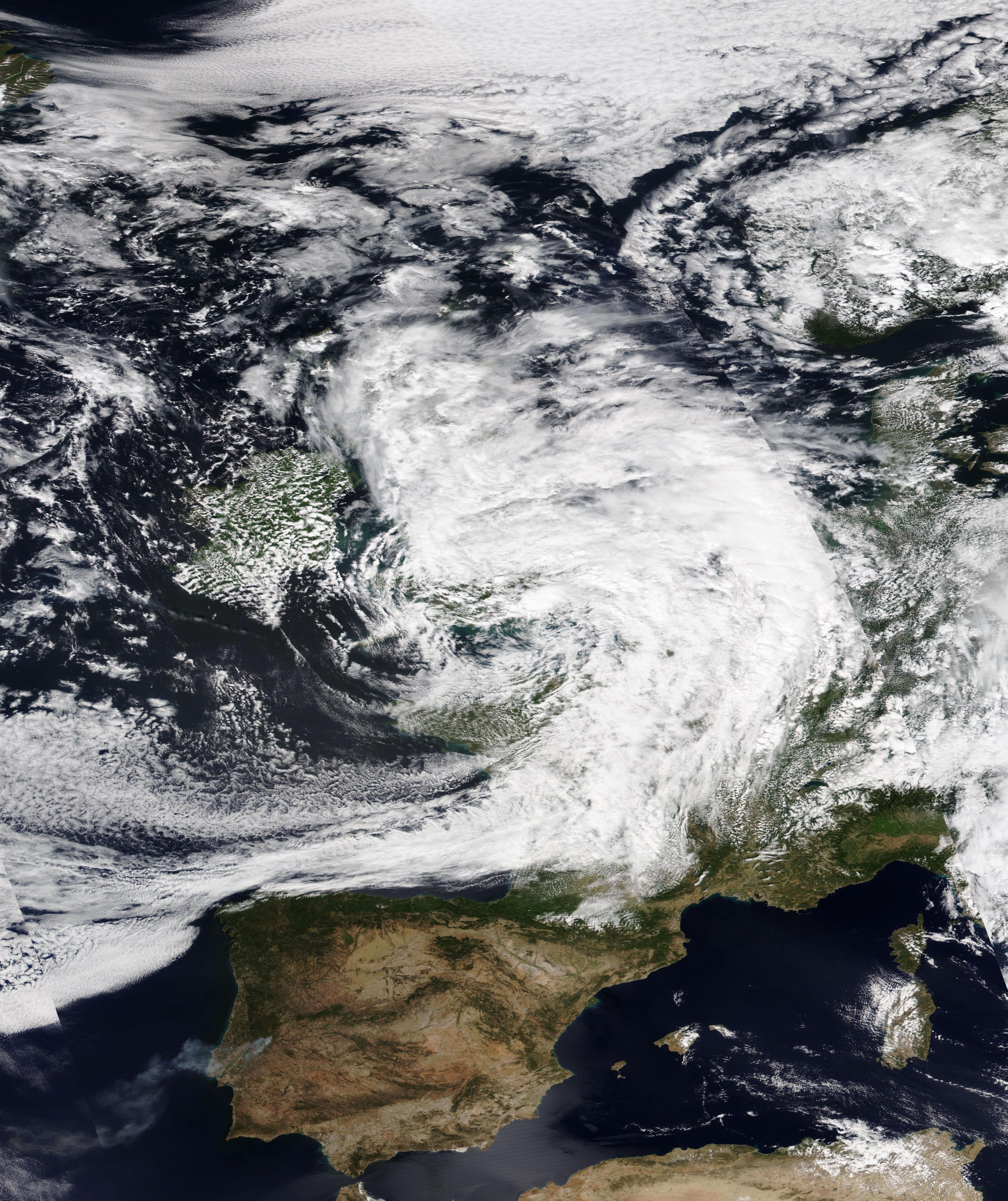
- Area affected: United Kingdom
- Date of impact: 4 August 2023 – 6 August 2023
- Maximum wind gust: Unknown
- Lowest pressure: 999 hPa (29.50 inHg)
- Fatalities: None
- Power outages: Unspecified
- Damage: Unspecified

Storm Antoni began affecting the United Kingdom on 4 August, the same day it was named by the Met Office. It is the latest first Met Office-named storm of the season. The system was also named Yves by the Deutscher Wetterdienst.

=== Storm Hans ===
Storm Hans
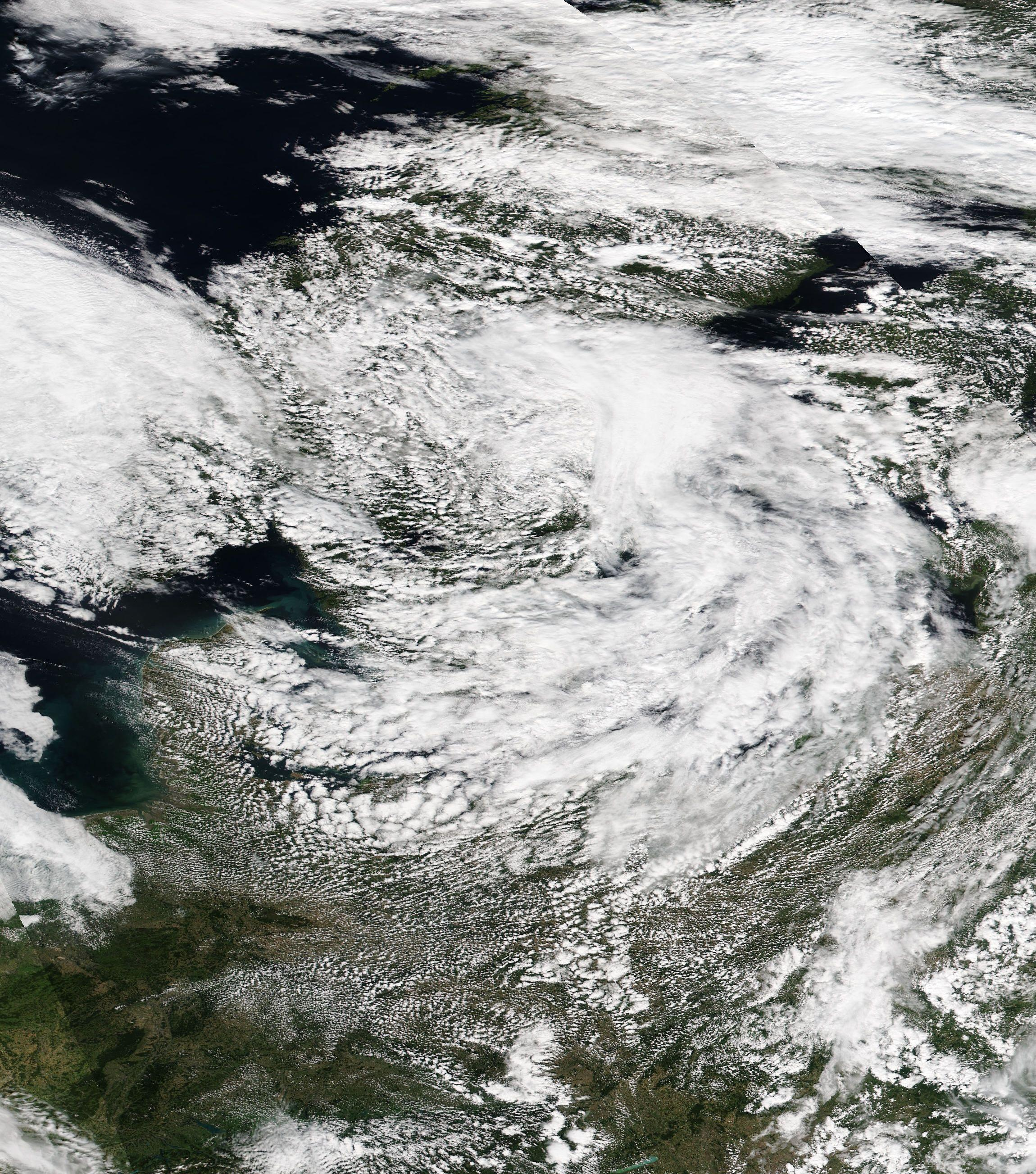
- Date of impact: 6–12 August 2023
- Maximum wind gust: 130 km/h (81 mph)
- Lowest pressure: 979 hPa (28.91 inHg)
- Fatalities: 2
- Power outages: 40,000
- Damage: Estimated 900M€ (985M$)

Storms Petar and Antoni coalesced and formed Storm Hans. In Sweden, roads were flooded and in Hudiksvall Municipality, a train carrying 120 passengers derailed. Strong straight line winds flattened aroung 0.5 to 1 million cubic meters of forest in Västerbotten. Waves in Denmark were reported to be up to eight metres (26 ft) high, and in Norway, several people were evacuated. In Latvia and Lithuania, two people were killed by falling trees. Additionally, 40,000 customers were left without electricity in Kurzeme and Zemgale. After several days of heavy rain in Norway, a dam broke into the Glomma river in Braskereidfoss on 9 August. Locals were evacuated. On 10 August, the local government of Hamar floods the speed skating venue Vikingskipet to relieve the rest of the city.

=== Storm Betty ===
Storm Betty
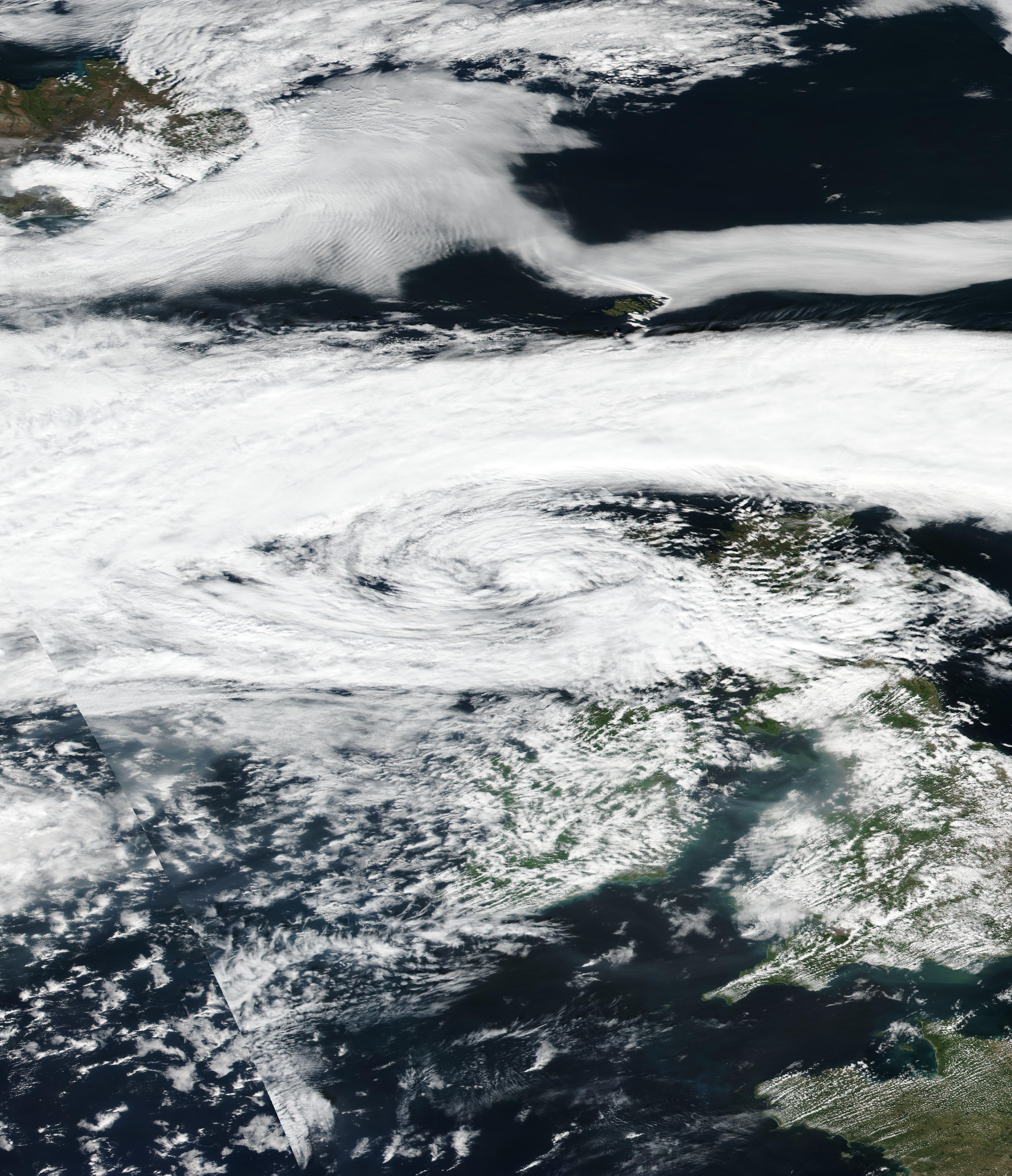
- Storm Betty on 19 August
- Date of impact: 18–20 August 2023
- Maximum wind gust: 106 km/h (66 mph; 57 kn)
- Lowest pressure: 985 hPa (29.09 inHg)
- Fatalities: None
- Power outages: 70,000
- Damage: Unspecified

Storm Betty was named by Met Éireann on 18 August, and was expected to bring strong winds, heavy rain and thunderstorms to Ireland and the United Kingdom through 18–19 August. At least 70,000 people were left without power. High winds from the storm caused trees to fall down, blocking roads and in some cases damaging vehicles. A gust of 66 mph was recorded in north-west Wales.

=== Storm Rea ===
Storm Rea
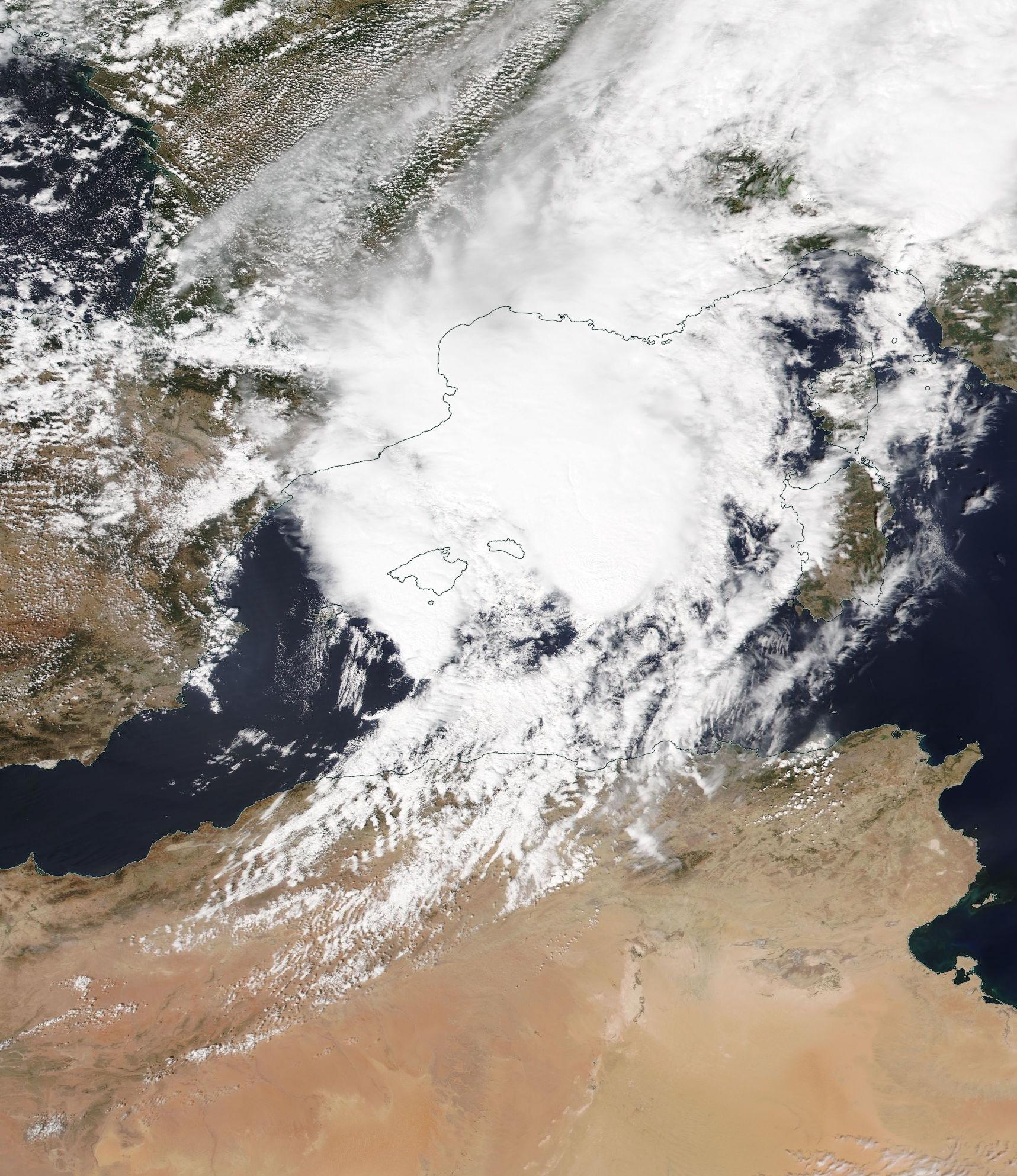
- Storm Rea on 27 August
- Date of impact: 26–28 August 2023
- Maximum wind gust: Unspecified
- Lowest pressure: Unspecified
- Fatalities: None
- Power outages: None
- Damage: Unspecified

Storm Rea was named by the Italian Meteorological Service on 27 August 2023.

=== Storm Daniel ===
Storm Daniel
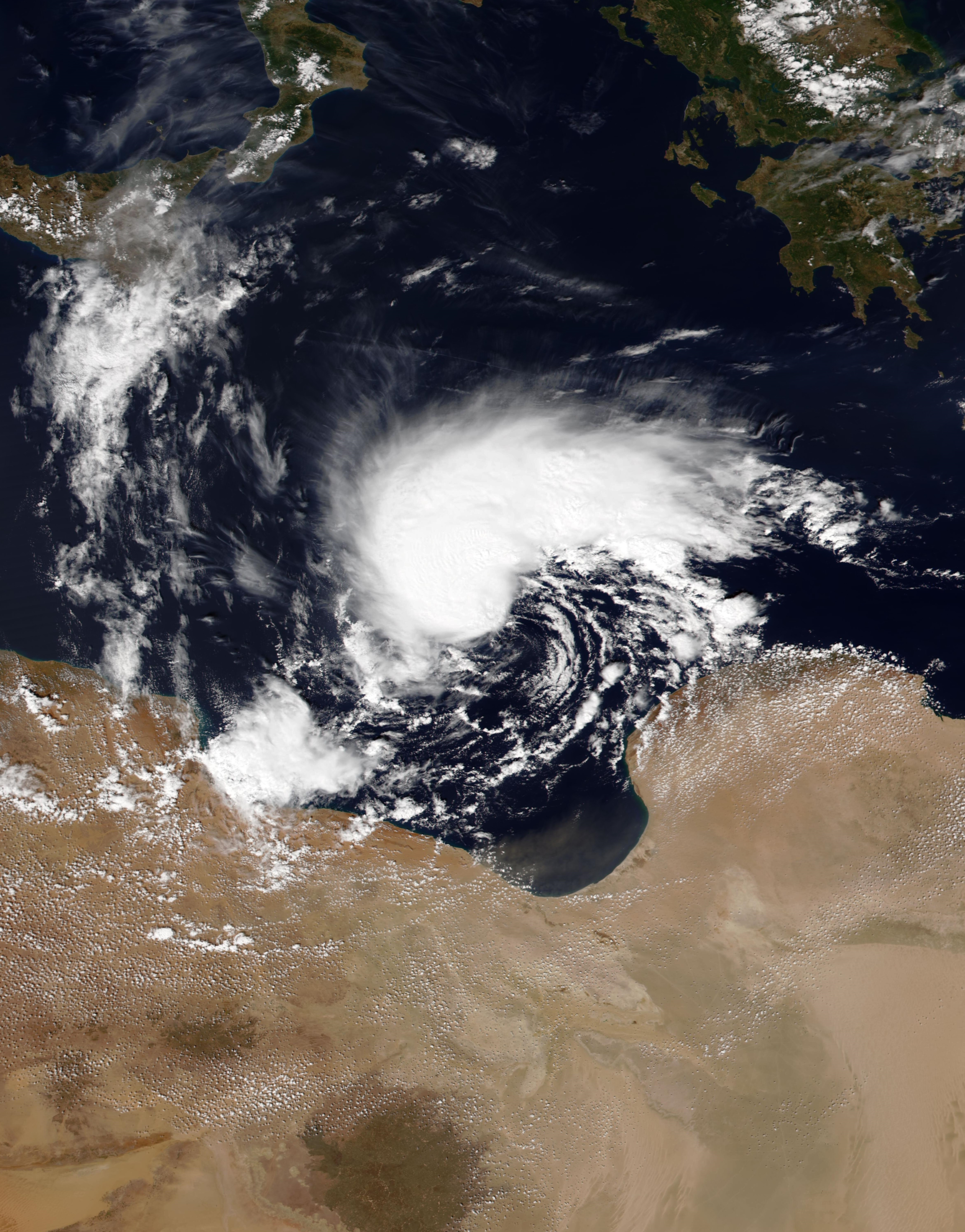
- Storm Daniel on 9 September

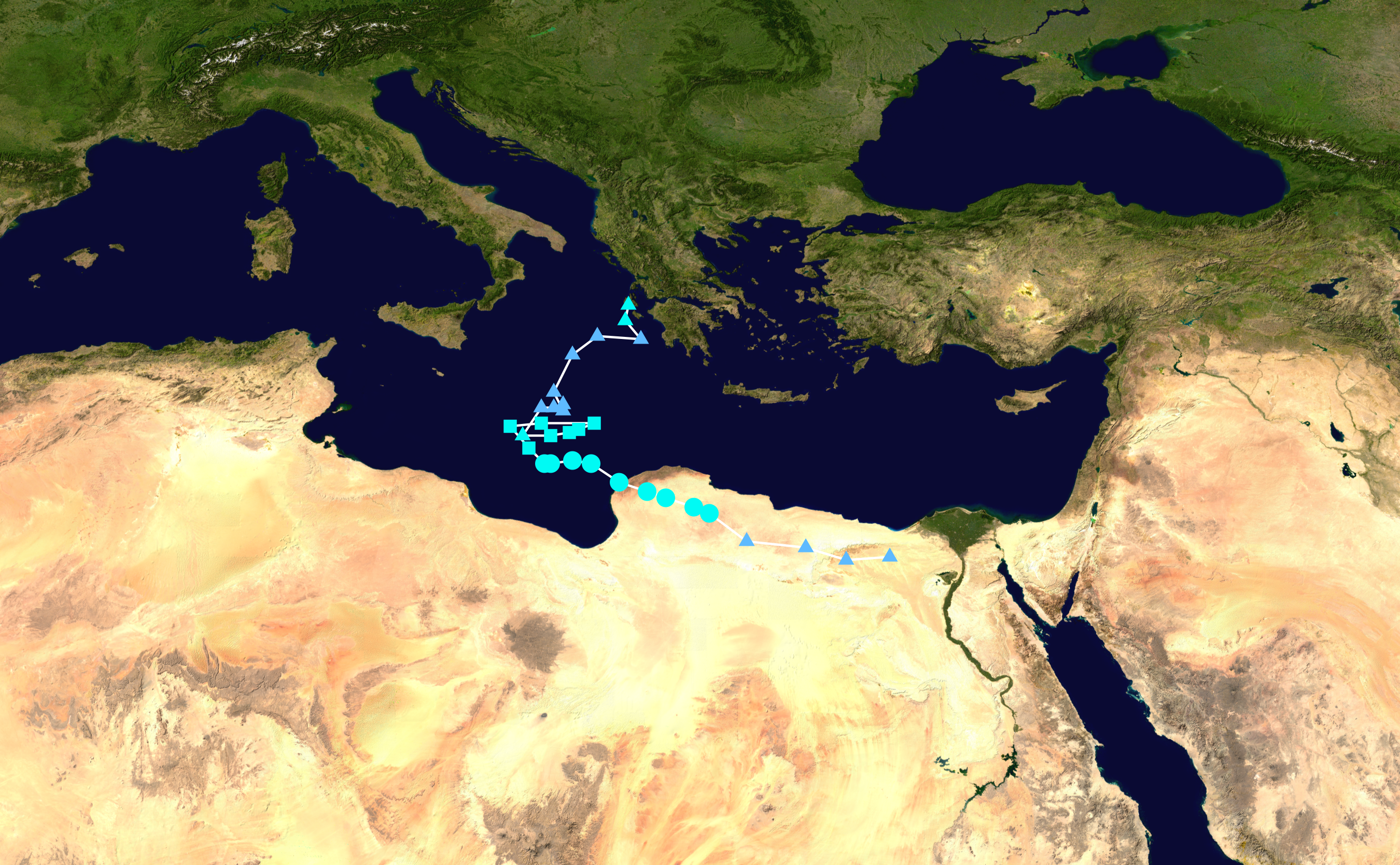
- Track of Storm Daniel according to Met Office
- Area affected: Greece, Turkey, Bulgaria, Italy, Malta, Libya, Egypt
- Date of impact: 4–12 September 2023
- Maximum wind gust: Approx. 100 km/h (62 mph; 54 kn)
- Lowest pressure: 999 hPa (29.5 inHg)
- Fatalities: 5,951+ (18,000–20,000 estimated)
- Power outages: Unspecified
- Damage: >€19.9 billion

Storm Daniel was named by the Hellenic National Meteorological Service on 4 September and was expected to bring heavy rainfall and heavy winds in Greece, especially in Greece's Thessaly region. On 5 September, the city of Volos was flooded extensively. The village of Zagora recorded 754 mm of rain in 24 hours, a record for Greece. The total rainfall reached 1,096 mm. Seventeen people were confirmed dead in Greece, while neighbouring countries Turkey and Bulgaria respectively recorded seven and four fatalities. Extensive flooding occurred in the plain of Thessaly, in Palamas, Karditsa and the city of Larisa and hundreds civilians were rescued. The flood water covered a region of about 720 square kilometers. In the Halkidiki region several seaside villages such as Ierissos experienced damage due to the heavy wind. In the seaside village of Toroni in Halkidiki a canoeing woman got swept away by the wind but was later found. The torrential rainfall was a result of a cut-off low. Early on 9 September, the system showed signs of subtropical transition; later on the day, the storm developed a warm core while an ASCAT pass recorded sustained winds of 45 knots before making landfall near Benghazi, Libya. In Libya, Storm Daniel caused flooding in Marj, Bayda, Tobruk, Derna, and the Jabal al Akhdar district, as well as Benghazi, Susa, and Misrata. Two dams were reported to have collapsed near Derna. The flood and heavy rain caused the deaths of at least 5,923 people in the country according to official reports, however, it is estimated that as many as 18,000 to 20,000 people may have died. A state of extreme emergency was declared by the local authorities following the storm.

=== Storm Elias ===
Storm Elias
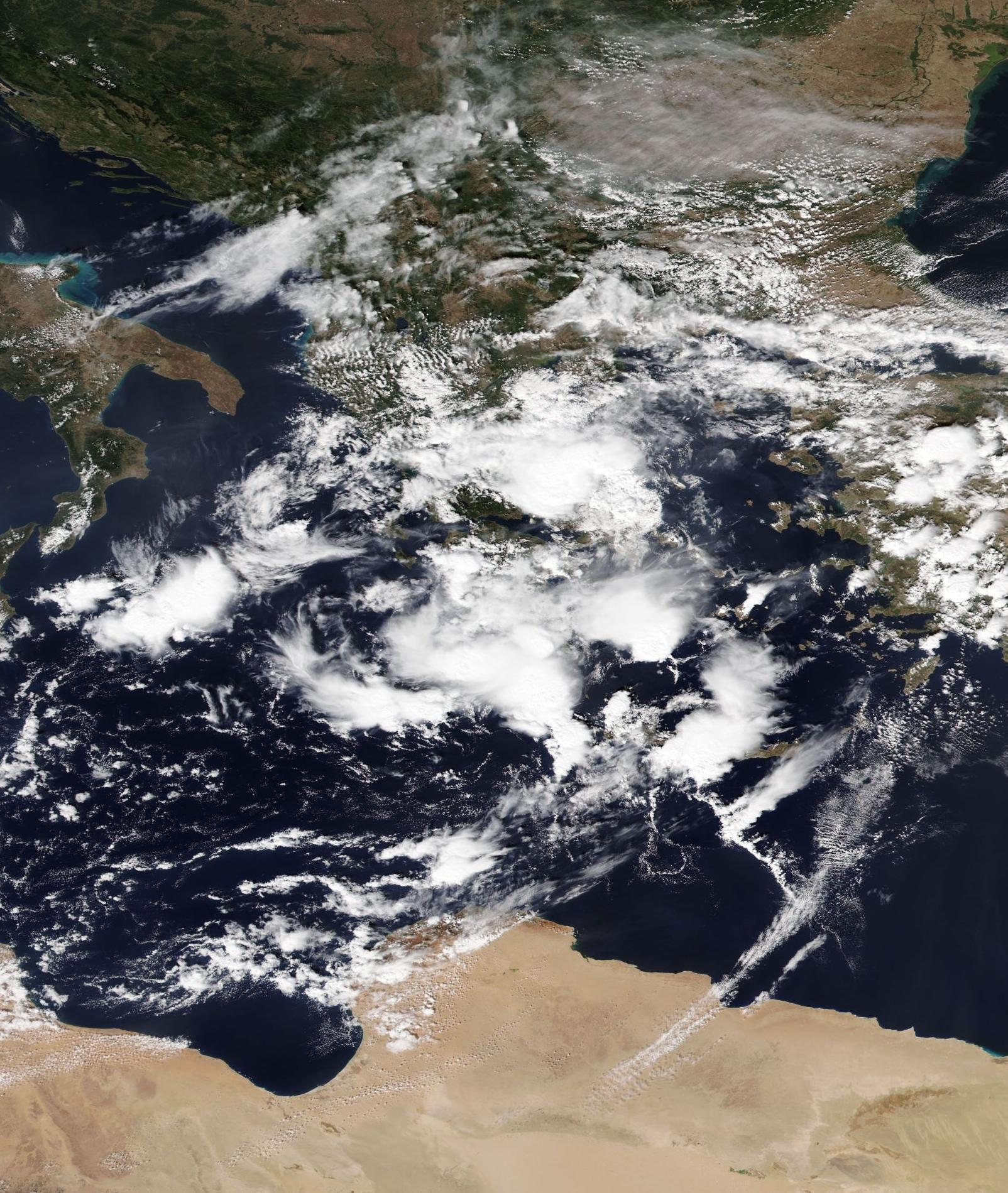
- Storm Elias on 27 September
- Date of impact: 25–29 September 2023
- Fatalities: 1

Storm Elias produced large, damaging hail across Greece on 25 September. Streets flooded in the cities of Trikala and Xylokastro on the evening of September 25.

During September 27 many cities in northern Euboea flooded reportedly four rivers overflowed, roads in the city of Volos, being flooded last time during Storm Daniel flooded as well. One civilian helicopter crashed from the extreme weather and as a result killing its pilot. By 28 September, Volos saw 298 millimetres (11.7 in) of rainfall in a 14-hour period; meanwhile, Limni had 216 millimetres (8.5 in) in 7 hours, and Istiaia 140 millimetres (5.5 in) in 3.5 hours. During the following days, heavy rains were reported in Istanbul on 28 and 29 September, especially in Küçükçekmece, Başakşehir, Esenyurt, Gaziosmanpaşa, Sultangazi and Büyükçekmece. The storm was expected to head towards Latakia and Tartus in Syria and northern Lebanon, yet no reports of actual effects materialized. Images acquired from a Sentinel-2 satellite showed large amounts of sediment washed away by floods as the Pineios river discharges in the Aegean Sea.

== Season effects ==
Storm	FUB name	Dates active	Highest wind gust	Lowest pressure	Areas affected	Fatalities (+missing)	Damage	Refs
Danielle	NHC assigned	8 – 15 September 2022	100 km/h (62 mph)	995 hPa (29.38 inHg)	Portugal and Spain	0	Moderate	
Ana	Reili	15 – 21 September 2022	75 km/h (47 mph)	Unspecified	France, Italy, Slovenia, Croatia, Serbia, Hungary, Slovakia, Ukraine and Poland	12 (+1)	Unspecified	
Bogdan	Ute	24 – 29 September 2022	95 km/h (59 mph)	Unspecified	Tunisia, Italy, Greece and Balkans	0	Unspecified	
Clio	n/a	25 – 26 September 2022	35 km/h (22 mph)	Unspecified	Montenegro	0	Unspecified	
Dino	n/a	30 September – 6 October 2022	135 km/h (84 mph)	Unspecified	Italy and Greece	0	Unspecified	
Bettina	FUB assigned	7 – 13 October 2022	180 km/h (110 mph)	975 hPa (28.79 inHg)	Iceland	0	Unspecified	
Elke	FUB assigned	14 – 21 October 2022	145 km/h (90 mph)	980 hPa (28.94 inHg)	United Kingdom, Norway, Sweden, Finland, Estonia and Russia	0	Unspecified	
Armand	Georgina	19 – 23 October 2022	133 km/h (83 mph)	980 hPa (28.94 inHg)	Portugal, France, United Kingdom and Ireland	0	Unspecified	
Béatrice	Helgard II	20 – 27 October 2022	140 km/h (87 mph)	986 hPa (29.12 inHg)	Iceland, Iberia, France and United Kingdom	0	Unspecified	
Cláudio	Karsta	30 October – 2 November 2022	185 km/h (115 mph)	994 hPa (29.35 inHg)	United Kingdom, France, Netherlands	1	Unspecified	
Marion	FUB assigned	1 – 8 November 2022	Unspecified	975 hPa (28.79 inHg)	British Isles	0	Unspecified	
Eva	Ottilie	4 – 10 November 2022	100 km/h (62 mph)	1001 hPa (29.56 inHg)	Italy, Libya, Albania, Montenegro, Bosnia and Herzegovina, Croatia and Turkey	0	Unspecified	
Philomena	FUB Assigned	7 – 10 November 2022	110 km/h (68 mph)	970 hPa (28.64 inHg)	United Kingdom	0	Unspecified	
Regina	FUB assigned	14 – 21 November 2022	Unspecified	975 hPa (28.79 inHg)	United Kingdom	0	Unspecified	
Fobos	n/a	19 – 24 November 2022	Unspecified	1005 hPa (29.68 inHg)	Italy	0	Unspecified	
Denise	n/a	21 – 27 November 2022	100 km/h (62 mph)	990 hPa (29.23 inHg)	Spain, Italy, Corsica, Balkans, Ukraine, Russia	14	€2 million (£1.7 million)	
Ariel	Yuki	29 November – 2 December 2022	Unspecified	1005 hPa (29.68 inHg)	Italy, Greece	0	Unspecified	
Efrain	n/a	10 – 17 December 2022	Unspecified	955 hPa (28.20 inHg)	Portugal	3	Unspecified	
Gaia	Birgit	10 – 17 December 2022	Unspecified	995 hPa (29.38 inHg)	Greece, Italy, Montenegro	0	Unspecified	
Fien	Harto	14 – 20 January 2023	150 km/h (93 mph)	Unspecified	Spain, France, Italy, Central Europe	1	Unspecified	
Gérard	Gero	15 – 17 January 2023	163 km/h (101 mph)	973 hPa (28.73 inHg)	France, United Kingdom, Belgium, Netherlands, Germany, Denmark, Ireland	0	Unspecified	
Hannelore	Jan	19 – 28 January 2023	151 km/h (94 mph)	992 hPa (29.29 inHg)	France, Spain, Italy, Turkey, Croatia, Greece and Slovenia	0	Unspecified	
Barbara	n/a	5 – 8 February 2023	Unspecified	Unspecified	Israel, Turkey, Greece and Cyprus	1	Unspecified	
Isaack	n/a	6 – 8 February 2023	Unspecified	Unspecified	Spain, France	0	Unspecified	
Helios	n/a	9 – 11 February 2023	Unspecified	Unspecified	Malta	0	Unspecified	
Otto	Ulf	16 – 21 February 2023	193 km/h (120 mph)	977 hPa (28.85 inHg)	United Kingdom, Faroe Islands, Norway, Denmark, Sweden, Poland	0	Unspecified	
Juliette	Zakariyya	27 February – 4 March 2023	114 km/h (71 mph)	Unspecified	Italy, Spain, France	0	Unspecified	
Kamiel	n/a	27 February – 4 March 2023	Unspecified	Unspecified	The Azores	0	Unspecified	
Larisa	n/a	8 – 15 March 2023	192 km/h (119 mph)	970 hPa (28.64 inHg)	United Kingdom, Belgium, Ireland, France and Netherlands	0	Moderate	
Mathis	Markus	30 March – 2 April 2023	150 km/h (93 mph)	979 hPa (28.91 inHg)	France, United Kingdom	1	Unspecified	
Ilina	Norbert	2 – 8 April 2023	Unspecified	993 hPa (29.32 inHg)	Italy	0	Unspecified	
Noa	Quax	11 – 15 April 2023	156 km/h (97 mph)	973 hPa (28.73 inHg)	Benelux, France, Ireland, United Kingdom	2	Unspecified	
Leon	n/a	13 – 16 April 2023	Unspecified	998 hPa (29.47 inHg)	Italy	0	Unspecified	
Minerva	Chappu	15 – 18 May 2023	65 km/h	994 hPa (29.35 inHg)	Italy	15	€10 billion (£8.592 billion)	
Nino	n/a	18 – 23 May 2023	116 km/h (72 mph)	992 hPa (29.29 inHg)	Algeria, Tunisia, Malta, Italy	1	Unspecified	
Oscar	n/a	4 – 12 June 2023	Unspecified	991 hPa (29.26 inHg)	The Azores, Canary Islands, Portugal, Spain, France, Ireland and United Kingdom	0	Unspecified	
Olga	n/a	14 – 16 June 2023	Unknown	Unknown	Italy	0	Unspecified	
Poly	FUB Assigned	4 – 7 July 2023	148 km/h (92 mph)	992 hPa (29.29 inHg)	United Kingdom, Northern France, Belgium, Netherlands, Germany, and Denmark	2	€50,000,000	
Patrícia	Xan	2 – 5 August 2023	Unknown	981 hPa (28.97 inHg)	Ireland, United Kingdom, Netherlands, France, Belgium, Sweden	1	Unspecified	,
Petar	Zacharias	4 – 6 August 2023	Unknown	1,002 hPa (29.59 inHg)	Greece, Italy	0	Unspecified	
Antoni	Yves	4 – 6 August 2023	Unknown	999 hPa (29.50 inHg)	United Kingdom, France	1	Unspecified	
Hans	n/a	6 – 12 August 2023	Unknown	979 hPa (28.91 inHg)	Denmark, Finland, Norway, Sweden, Lithuania	2	Unspecified	
Betty	n/a	18 – 20 August 2023	106 km/h (66 mph)	985 hPa (29.09 inHg)	Ireland, UK	0	Unspecified	
Rea	n/a	26 – 28 August 2023	Unknown	Unknown	Italy, Spain, and France	0	Unspecified	
Daniel	n/a	4 – 12 September 2023	85 km/h (53 mph)	1009 mbar	Libya, Greece, Bulgaria, Turkey, Egypt and Israel	5,951+ (18,000–20,000 estimated)	>€19.9 billion (US$21.14 billion)	
Total: 45	FUB names	8 September 2022 – 28 August 2023	Otto 193 km/h (120 mph)	Efrain 955 hPa (28.2 inHg)	Europe	6,000+ (18,000–20,000+ estimated)	~€30.000 billion (£25.000 billion)	

== See also ==
- Weather of: 2022, 2023
- Tropical cyclones in 2023
- 2022–23 North American winter
- List of historical European windstorm names
