= List of storms named Vivian =

The name Vivian has been used for one tropical cyclone in the East Pacific Ocean and one European windstorm.

In the East Pacific:

- Tropical Storm Vivian (1985) – weak tropical storm that formed in the open ocean.

In Europe:

- Storm Vivian (1990) – a damaging winter storm that affected several countries.

== See also ==
- Storm Oriana (2026) – a European windstorm that was named Viviana by the Free University of Berlin.
