= Storm Wiebke =

Severe windstorm across Germany in 2020

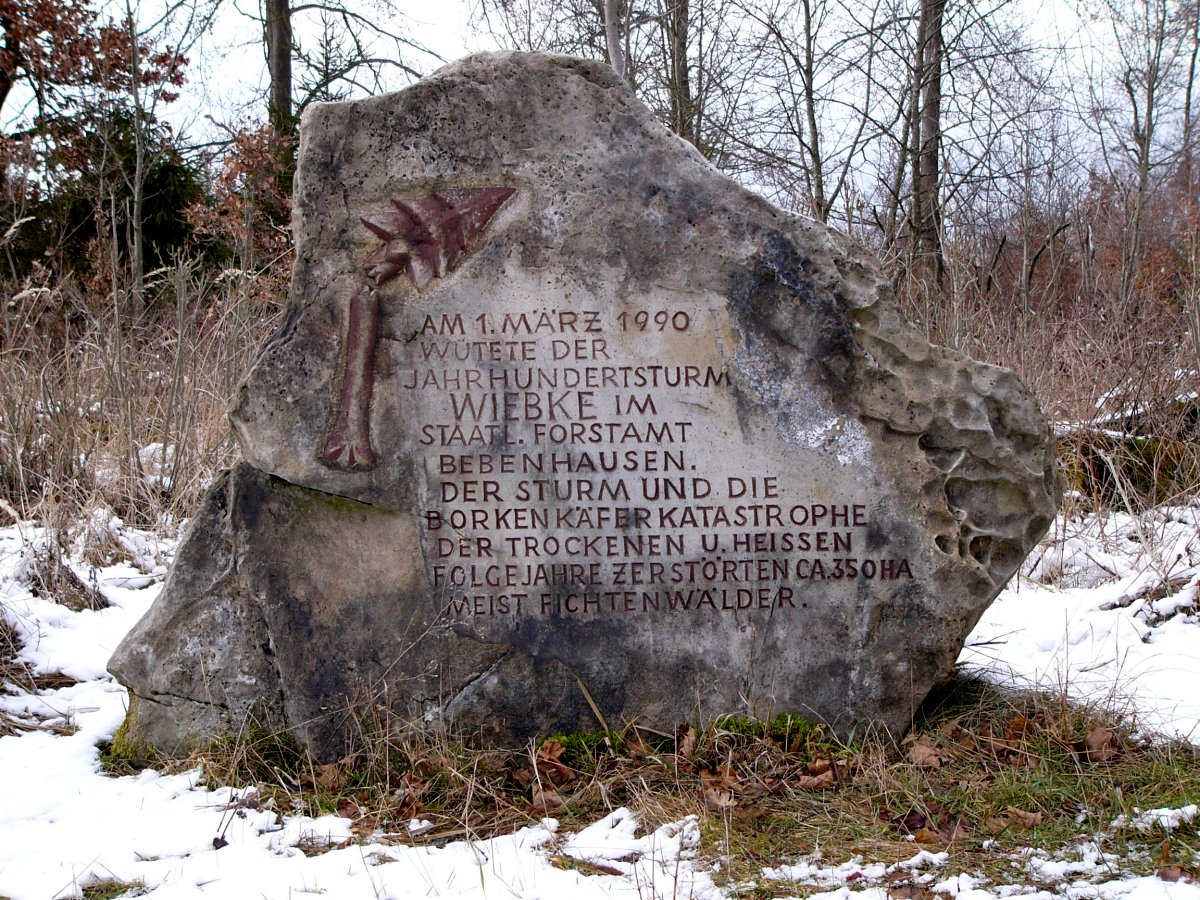
- Memorial stone to commemorate the victims

Meteorological history
- Formed: 28 February 1990
- Dissipated: 1 March 1990

Extratropical cyclone European windstorm
- Highest winds: 130 to 200 km/h (81 to 124 mph)
- Highest gusts: 275 km/h (171 mph) at Jungfraujoch, Switzerland

Overall effects
- Casualties: 35 fatalities
- Damage: 1.5 billion Euros (insured loss in Germany)
- Areas affected: Germany, (Switzerland, Austria)

Wiebke was a severe windstorm that raged across Germany and parts of Switzerland and Austria during the night of 28 February to 1 March 1990. It completed a series of eight storms that raged across Western and Central Europe in the late winter of 1990 (Daria, Herta, Judith, Nana, Ottilie, Polly, Vivian, and Wiebke).

== Description ==
Wiebke reached wind speeds of 130 to 200 km/h (81 to 124 mph), at the Jungfraujoch in Switzerland there were even gale-force winds of 285 km/h (177 mph).

== Casualties and damage ==
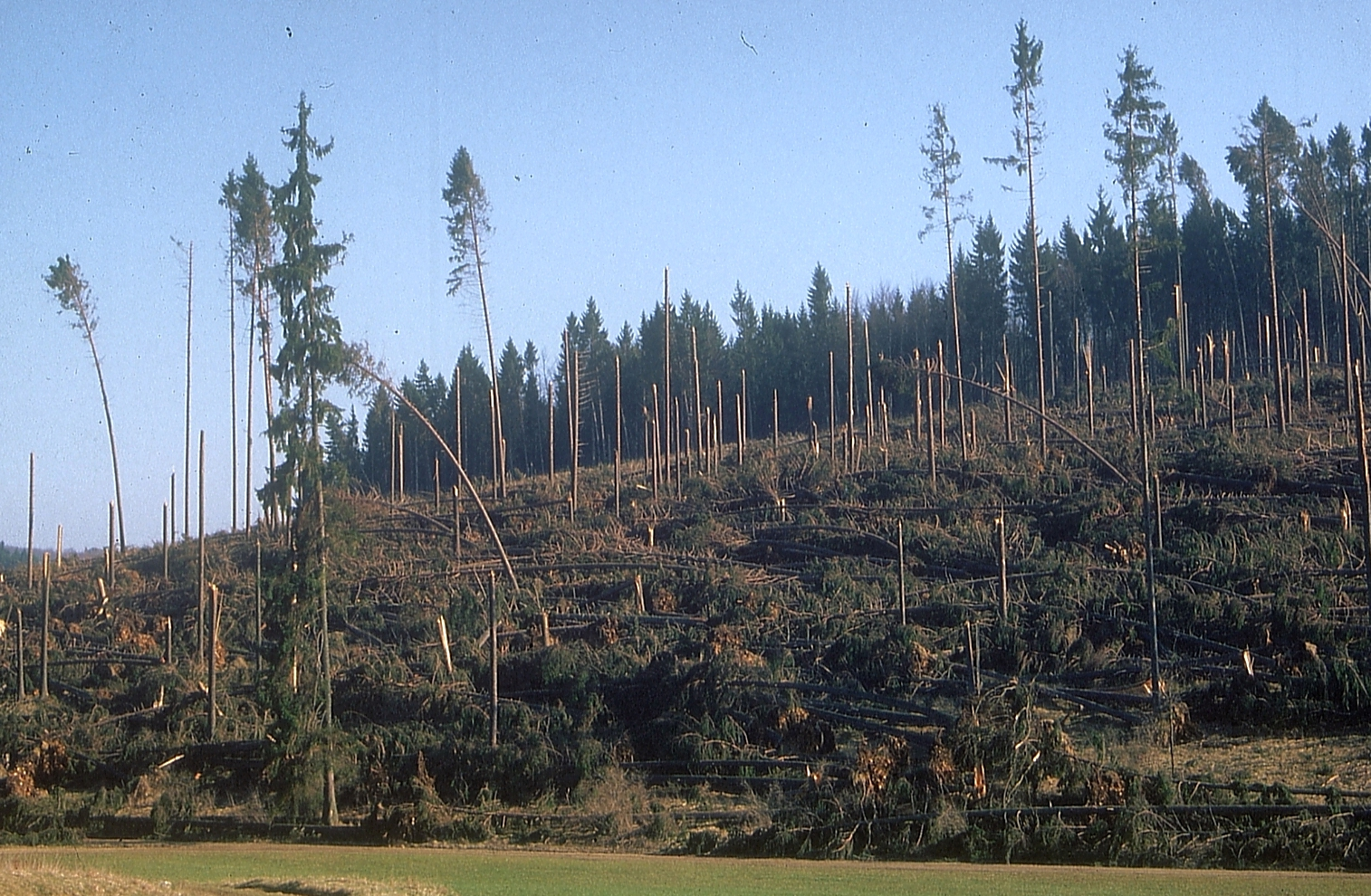
Spruce stands destroyed by Wiebke near Merklingen

The storm claimed a total of 35 lives. The damage caused to forestry, houses or cars was in the billions. Particularly in low mountain regions, a large number of trees, especially entire stands of spruce, Douglas fir and beech, were snapped or thrown like matchsticks. Projections assume 60 to 70 million solid cubic metres of storm-damaged wood in the German forests, which at the time was roughly equivalent to twice the annual felling in Germany.

The windstorm severely damaged the plastic model of the Cologne Cathedral's finials from 1980.

Follow-up costs were incurred due to the costly reforestation of former coniferous forests that were not suited to their location, with hardwoods. During the dangerous processing of the storm wood, accidents occurred long after the actual storm event due to logs shooting up from windthrow nests. Due to the large quantities of storm-damaged wood that were produced at short notice, several times the annual harvest of coniferous wood came onto the market and led to a drop in prices. In addition, in some places no more coniferous wood could be felled for years. The establishment and operation of wet storage facilities for the preservation of the salvaged timber caused additional high costs for several years. As a result, the actual financial damage caused by storm Wiebke cannot be quantified in the end.

As after other storms, there was a shortage of long log transporters needed to quickly remove the accumulating timber and thus avoid loss of value. Forestry companies and timber transporters from Norway, Sweden, the north-west of the USA and other timber-producing nations were brought to Germany to help, causing further costs. However, the rapid bringing and wet storage of the coniferous wood prevented the spread of bark beetle calamities.

In its report "Winter storms in Europe - History from 1703 to 2012", Aon Benfield assumes an insured loss in Germany of 1.5 billion euros.
