= List of storms named Mina =

The name Mina has been used for two tropical cyclones in the Philippine Area of Responsibility by PAGASA in the Western Pacific Ocean. It replaced the name Manang after it was removed for unknown reasons following the 2003 Pacific typhoon season.

- Typhoon Mitag (2007) (T0723, 24W, Mina) – made landfall in the Philippines, killing 71 people and causing approximately $20 million (2007 USD) in damages.
- Typhoon Nanmadol (2011) (T1111, 14W, Mina) – also made landfall in the Philippines, killing 35 people and causing approximately $900 million (2011 USD) in damages. Later made landfall in Taiwan and Fujian.

The name Mina was retired following the 2011 Pacific typhoon season and was replaced with Marilyn.

== See also ==
- List of storms named Meena – a similar name that has been used in the South Pacific Ocean.
- List of storms named Mona – a similar name that has been used in the South Pacific Ocean and in the East Pacific Ocean.
- List of storms named Nina – a similar name that has been used in four tropical cyclone basins.
