= Windstorm Xaver =

Xaver may refer to:

- Cyclone Berit (2011)
- Cyclone Bodil (2013)
