= List of storms named Mitag =

The name Mitag (Yapese: Mitaeg, [mitaːɣ]) has been used for five tropical cyclones in the western North Pacific Ocean. The name was contributed by the Federated States of Micronesia and is a feminine given name meaning "my eyes" in Yapese.

- Typhoon Mitag (2002) (T0202, 02W, Basyang) - A powerful Category 5 storm in March 2002, but did not affect land.
- Typhoon Mitag (2007) (T0723, 24W, Mina) – A relatively strong storm that struck the coast of Luzon.
- Tropical Storm Mitag (2014) (T1406, Ester) – Recognised as a subtropical storm by the Joint Typhoon Warning Center
- Typhoon Mitag (2019) (T1918, 19W, Onyok) – A moderately strong typhoon that struck South Korea.
- Severe Tropical Storm Mitag (2025) (T2517, 23W, Mirasol) – struck Northern Luzon and Southern China.

The name Mitag was retired following the 2025 Pacific typhoon season and a replacement name will be given at the 59th WMO/Typhoon Committee Annual Session in spring 2027.
