= List of storms named Marilyn =

The name Marilyn has been used for three tropical cyclones worldwide: one in the Atlantic Ocean and two in the Philippine Area of Responsibility in the West Pacific Ocean.

In the Atlantic:

- Hurricane Marilyn (1995) – Category 3 hurricane that caused significant damage in the Leeward Islands.

The name Marilyn was retired after the 1995 season and replaced with Michelle.

In the West Pacific:

- Typhoon In-fa (2015) (T1526, 27W, Marilyn) – a strong typhoon, but stayed out at sea.
- Tropical Depression Marilyn (2019) – a weak system that drifted over the open sea before dissipating.

== See also ==
- Storm Joseph (2026) – a European windstorm that was named Marilu by the Free University of Berlin.

Preceded by Liwayway	Pacific typhoon season names Marilyn	Succeeded by Nimfa
