= Typhoon Mitag (2007) =

Pacific typhoon in 2007

Typhoon Mitag (Mina)
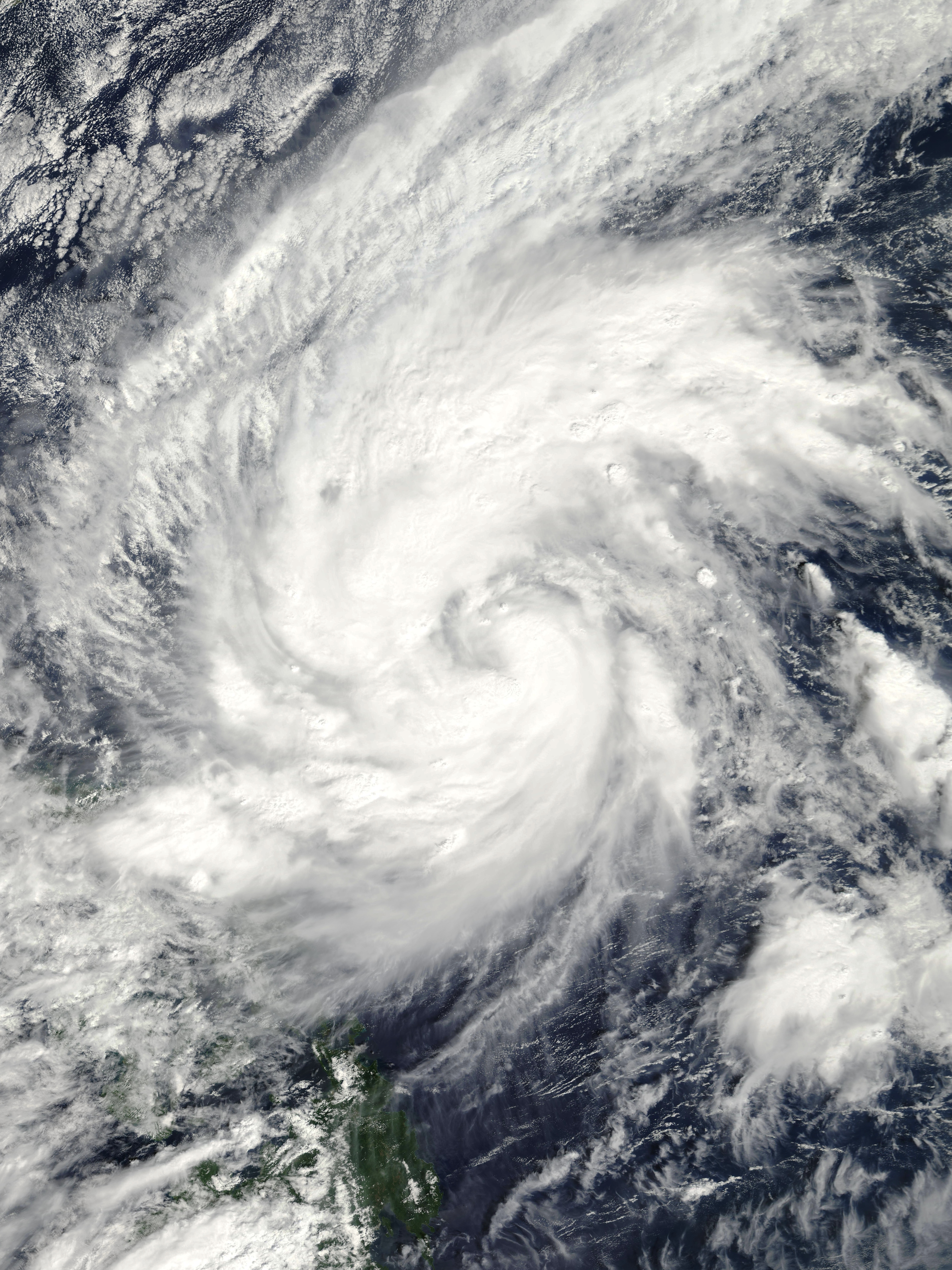
- Typhoon Mitag near peak intensity on November 22

Meteorological history
- Formed: November 20, 2007
- Extratropical: November 27, 2007
- Dissipated: November 27, 2007

Typhoon
- 10-minute sustained (JMA)
- Highest winds: 150 km/h (90 mph)
- Lowest pressure: 955 hPa (mbar); 28.20 inHg

Category 2-equivalent typhoon
- 1-minute sustained (SSHWS/JTWC)
- Highest winds: 175 km/h (110 mph)
- Lowest pressure: 952 hPa (mbar); 28.11 inHg

Overall effects
- Fatalities: 67 direct, 4 indirect (71 total)
- Missing: 38
- Damage: $19.8 million (2007 USD)
- Areas affected: Philippines, Malaysia, Taiwan and Okinawa
- IBTrACS
- Part of the 2007 Pacific typhoon season

Typhoon Mitag, (Note: The name Mitag (Yapese: Mitaeg, [mitaːɣ]) was contributed by the Federated States of Micronesia and is a feminine given names meaning "my eyes" in Yapese.) known in the Philippines as Typhoon Mina, was a strong typhoon that caused deadly flooding in the Philippines in late November 2007. As the twenty-fourth named storm and the fourteenth typhoon of the 2007 Pacific typhoon season, it originated from an area of atmospheric convection south-southwest of Guam. The area of convection was in a favorable environment for development, so it organized and a low-level circulation was found inside the disturbance. Not too long after, the JMA classified it as a tropical depression. On November 20, rainbands developed along the periphery of the depression as it moved into an area of good divergence. The JMA soon upgraded the depression to a tropical storm, designating it as Mitag. A few hours later, the JTWC issued their first advisory on Mitag, and so did PAGASA, naming it Mina. The storm strengthened significantly early on November 21 and became a further intensified. Later that day, the JTWC upgraded Mitag to a typhoon, and the JMA also upgraded it late that evening. As Mitag remained stationary for a day as a Category 2-equivalent typhoon, it changed its trajectory. Nonetheless, PAGASA announced that there is still a possibility of the typhoon to once again change its course. The storm turned northwest and made landfall late on November 25. It tracked Luzon and was downgraded to a severe tropical storm before emerging back over water on November 26. It turned back to the east before reaching Taiwan, and became extratropical on November 27.

== Meteorological history ==
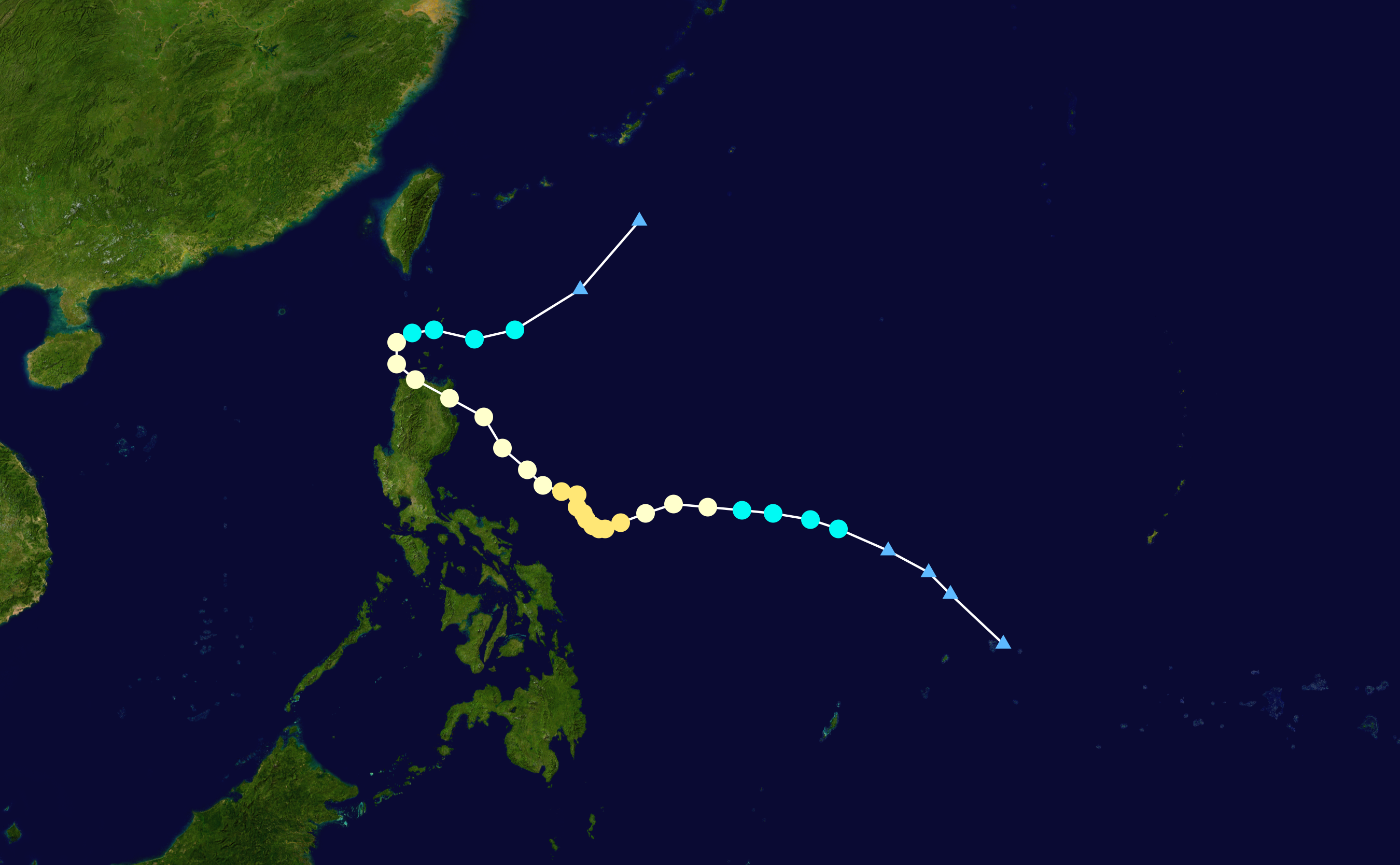
Map plotting the storm's track and intensity, according to the Saffir–Simpson scale Map key Saffir–Simpson scale Tropical depression (≤38 mph, ≤62 km/h) Tropical storm (39–73 mph, 63–118 km/h) Category 1 (74–95 mph, 119–153 km/h) Category 2 (96–110 mph, 154–177 km/h) Category 3 (111–129 mph, 178–208 km/h) Category 4 (130–156 mph, 209–251 km/h) Category 5 (≥157 mph, ≥252 km/h) Unknown Storm type Tropical cyclone Subtropical cyclone Extratropical cyclone, remnant low, tropical disturbance, or monsoon depression

Typhoon Mitag was first identified by the Joint Typhoon Warning Center (JTWC) on November 19, 2007 as an area of scattered convective activity situated roughly 410 km (255 mi) south-southwest of Guam. Located within a region of low wind shear and favoring good outflow, development of the system was anticipated over the following few days. Later that day, a low-level circulation was discovered as the disturbance became increasingly organized. Shortly thereafter, the Japan Meteorological Agency (JMA) classified the system as a tropical depression. Early on November 20, convective banding features developed along the periphery of the depression as it moved into an area of good divergence. Around 1200 UTC, the JMA upgraded the depression to a tropical storm, assigning it the name Mitag. Several hours later, the JTWC issued their first advisory on Mitag, designating it as Tropical Storm 24W. Around the same time, the Philippine Atmospheric, Geophysical and Astronomical Services Administration (PAGASA) issued their first advisory on the system as it entered their area of responsibility. They dubbed Mitag with the local Philippine name of Mina at this time.

The storm strengthened significantly early on November 21 and became a severe tropical storm. Later that day, the JTWC upgraded Mitag to a typhoon, and the JMA also upgraded it late that evening. As Mitag remained stationary in the Philippine Sea for a day as a Category 2-equivalent typhoon, it changed its course and instead of hitting Catanduanes and the Bicol Region, it will make a landfall at the Aurora-Isabela area. Nonetheless, PAGASA announced that there is still a possibility of the typhoon to once again change its course. The storm turned northwest towards northern Luzon and made landfall late on November 25. It tracked across the island and was downgraded to a severe tropical storm before emerging back over water on November 26. It turned back to the east before reaching Taiwan, and became extratropical on November 27.

== Preparations ==
On November 22, the National Disaster Coordinating Council (NDCC) of the Philippines took full precautions in advance of Typhoon Mitag. Only a tropical storm at the time, the NDCC ordered the evacuation of nearly 3,000 people and opened at least ten evacuation centers. Immediate standby funds of PHP3.2 million (US$67,000) and relief goods worth PHP41.1 million (US$860,700) were placed in the National Resource Operations Center. Trucks supplied with a combined 4,000 packs of clothing and 100 tents were prepped for immediate distribution after the storm. The Armed Forces of the Philippines placed five battalions, consisting of trucks, saws, boats, helicopters and naval ships to respond to reports of missing people and clear debris after the storm.

An estimated 300,000 people evacuated ahead of the storm from six provinces in Luzon. Roughly 15,000 people were also evacuated from Palanan. Hospital staff were placed on 24-hour standby to readily assist people injured by the storm. Typhoon Mitag became the most significant storm to threaten the country since Typhoon Durian one year prior. Thousands of residents were evacuated throughout 40 regions. The Government of the United States was on standby in Okinawa to immediately deploy assistance in fear of another major disaster. Roughly 30,000 people evacuated the Bicol Peninsula ahead of the storm. In Isabela province, 54,000 people were evacuated from low-lying areas prone to flooding. Trucks with relief items, such as food and medicine, were stocked and prepped for immediate deployment.

Over 2,000 residents were evacuated from Albay Province by November 22. Officials reported that nearly 654,000 people had to be evacuated from the province, especially those near the Mayon Volcano. In Legazpi City, Camalig, Daraga, and Guinobatan towns over 9,000 people were evacuated due to the threat of lahars. Over 6,000 families were evacuated from Polangui town. Officials stated that there were at least 180,000 people in Albay that were at risk of being impacted by storm surge from Typhoon Mitag. More than 200,000 families were evacuated from Camarines Sur Province. Already impacted by Typhoon Hagibis, disaster officials requested PHP67 million (US$1.4 million) in funds for both storms. By November 23, officials urged over one million people to evacuate threatened areas as Typhoon Mitag was anticipated to become a very powerful typhoon.

== Impact ==
=== Philippines ===
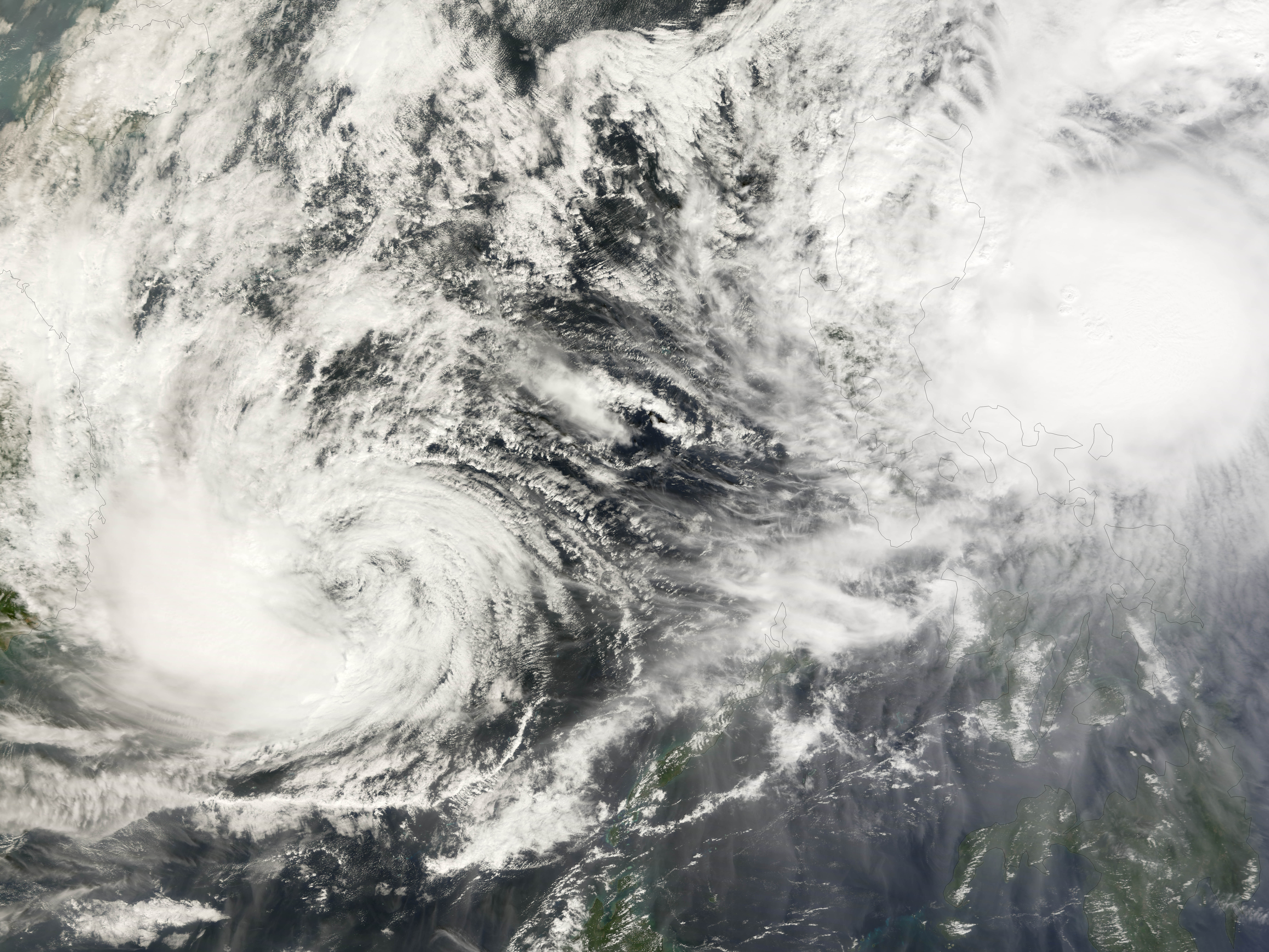
Typhoon Mitag (right) and Tropical Storm Hagibis (left) on November 25 near the Philippines

Typhoon Mitag produced torrential rainfall over the Philippines, triggering numerous landslides. At least 19 people were killed in landslides and eight others were reported as missing. These people were later confirmed to have died in landslides, seven of which occurred in Pinukpuk. Two people died of hypothermia and two others died from electrocution. Sixteen other fatalities resulted from drowning and one more from a flash flood. One landslide cut a portion of a major highway connecting Cagayan and Ilocos Norte.

A ship carrying 80 people capsized near the Nansha Islands on November 22. Fifty-five of the passengers were rescued; however, 25 remained missing. Hundreds of other fishermen were also presumed to be stranded on the islands during the storm. Rough seas produced by the storm also capsized two ferries, resulting in the drownings of three people. Thirty of the passengers were rescued while six others were listed as missing. A Philippine air force jet also went missing during their rescue mission near the capsized ships. The Coast Guard reported that there was no sign of either the ship or the plane during their search. Rescue attempts for the pilots were called off and they have been presumed dead.

Officials reported that 2,969 homes were destroyed and 17,950 others were damaged by the storm; a total of 779,930 people were affected. Throughout the country, damages to highways amounted to PHP162 million (US$3.79 million). Over 6,000 hectares of agricultural land was damaged or destroyed, leaving PHP109.6 million (US$2.56 million) in losses and damages to schools amounted to PHP210 million (US$4.93 million). Total damages from the storm amounted to PHP945 million (US$19.79 million).

=== Elsewhere ===
On November 24, the outer bands of Mitag brought winds up to 50 km/h (30 mph) to parts of eastern Malaysia. The town of Tawau, was particularly hard-hit, with 85 homes sustaining damage, mainly to roofs. Trees and power lines were also downed by the high winds, but there were no reports of any injuries. Off the coast of Taiwan, an Indonesian cargo ship with 27 crew members sank due to waves produced by Mitag. One of the men were rescued; however, the remaining 26 were not found. Rescue attempts were later called off and the remaining crew were presumed dead. The remnants of Mitag contributed to heavy rains in Okinawa which damaged 3 km (1.8 mi) of roads and triggered one landslide. Winds on the island gusted up to 74 km/h (46 mph).

== Aftermath ==
Search and rescue teams were deployed immediately by the government to the hardest hit areas. A military contingent was deployed to three towns in northern Cagayan isolated by flood waters. The National Food Authority stocked roughly 600,000 bags of rice to assist victims of the storm. The National Disaster Coordinating Council also provided 4,950 sacks of rice, worth PHP5 million (US$104,700) to the affected regions. By November 23, the provinces of Albay and Catanduanes declared a state of calamity due to the severity of damage. A week later, the Philippine Navy had already begun distributing food packs to the six regions affected by the typhoon. Military personnel were deployed throughout the country to reports of flash flooding, missing persons, evacuations and distribution of relief goods. Roughly PHP23.5 million (US$490,000) was provided by various agencies to assist victims of the storm.

On December 26, the Government of the Philippines announced that the Habitat for Humanity foundation was beginning construction of 495 shelters throughout the country. The total cost of the project was PHP42 million (US$879,500).

== See also ==
- Other tropical cyclones named Mitag
- Other tropical cyclones named Mina
- Typhoon Cora (1953)
- Typhoon Megi (2010)
- Typhoon Krosa (2013)
- Typhoon Yutu (2018)
