= Hurricane Marilyn =

Category 3 Atlantic hurricane in 1995

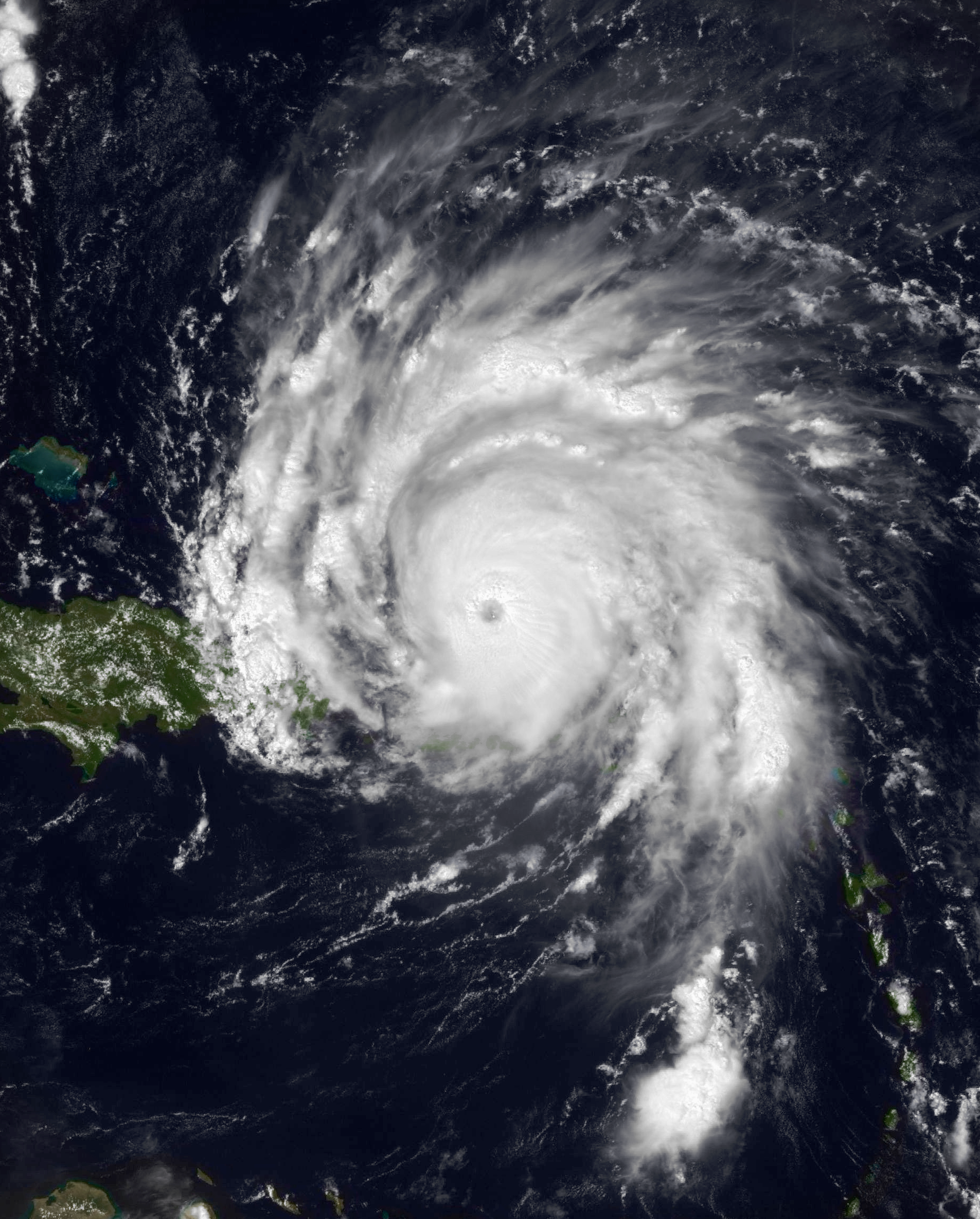
- Marilyn at peak intensity while north of Puerto Rico on September 16

Meteorological history
- Formed: September 12, 1995
- Extratropical: September 22, 1995
- Dissipated: September 30, 1995

Category 3 major hurricane
- 1-minute sustained (SSHWS/NWS)
- Highest winds: 115 mph (185 km/h)
- Lowest pressure: 949 mbar (hPa); 28.02 inHg

Overall effects
- Fatalities: 13 total
- Damage: $2.5 billion (1995 USD)
- Areas affected: Leeward Islands, Barbados, Martinique, Dominica, Guadeloupe, U.S. Virgin Islands, Puerto Rico, Bermuda
- IBTrACS
- Part of the 1995 Atlantic hurricane season

Hurricane Marilyn was the most powerful hurricane to strike the Virgin Islands since Hurricane Hugo of 1989, and the third such tropical cyclone in roughly a two-week time span to strike or impact the Leeward Islands, the others being Hurricane Iris and the much more powerful and destructive Hurricane Luis. The thirteenth named storm, seventh hurricane and third major hurricane of the extremely active 1995 Atlantic hurricane season, Marilyn formed on September 12 as a tropical depression from a tropical wave that moved off the coast of Africa on September 7. After formation, the storm quickly became a tropical storm, and steadily intensified into a hurricane by the time it struck the Lesser Antilles on September 14 at Category 1 strength. Entering the northeastern Caribbean Sea, rapid intensification ensued and it peaked on September 16 north of Puerto Rico as a Category 3 hurricane shortly after it had impacted the U.S. Virgin Islands. A Hurricane Hunter reconnaissance flight reported hail, which is unusual for tropical cyclones. After heading north past Bermuda, Marilyn weakened and became extratropical on September 22. The remnant circulation wandered the Atlantic Ocean from September 23 – October 1, just south of Nova Scotia.

Marilyn is responsible for a total of thirteen deaths, most due to drowning on boats or offshore. Eleven thousand people were left homeless on the island of St. Thomas, and estimated damages were set at $2 billion (1995 USD) in the USVI. The same area would be struck by Hurricane Bertha the next year, while still repairing from Hurricanes Luis and Marilyn, then successively hit by Hortense, Erika, Georges, Jose, Lenny and Debby.

== Meteorological history ==
Map plotting the storm's track and intensity, according to the Saffir–Simpson scale Map key Saffir–Simpson scale Tropical depression (≤38 mph, ≤62 km/h) Tropical storm (39–73 mph, 63–118 km/h) Category 1 (74–95 mph, 119–153 km/h) Category 2 (96–110 mph, 154–177 km/h) Category 3 (111–129 mph, 178–208 km/h) Category 4 (130–156 mph, 209–251 km/h) Category 5 (≥157 mph, ≥252 km/h) Unknown Storm type Tropical cyclone Subtropical cyclone Extratropical cyclone, remnant low, tropical disturbance, or monsoon depression

Marilyn's origins were from a tropical wave that formed off the African coast on September 7. Large, low-level winds were included in the wave's circulation, but little convection existed. The system continued west for a few days at about 19 mph (31 km/h) next to an anticyclonic aloft. On September 12, satellite pictures viewed the disorganized wave and declared it Tropical Depression Fifteen, after convection had increased. Tropical Depression Fifteen strengthened rapidly, becoming Tropical Storm Marilyn six hours later. One day after being named, Marilyn was upgraded to hurricane status, while turning on a more northwesterly track.

For the next few days, Marilyn's track took it towards the west-northwest and to the northwest, due to a weakness in the subtropical ridge. Marilyn was a Category 1 hurricane; it passed 52 mi (84 km) north of Barbados and Martinique. Marilyn passed over Dominica, and just Îles des Saintes and southwest of Guadeloupe on September 14, bringing heavy rains and strong winds with it. Marilyn continued on its northwesterly track, making landfall in the U.S. Virgin Islands on September 15, packing winds of 110 mph (180 km/h), a strong Category 2 strength hurricane. The eyewall, east-southeast of the center of Marilyn, passed over Saint Thomas later that day. After passing over Puerto Rico, Marilyn entered back into the Atlantic Ocean on September 16.

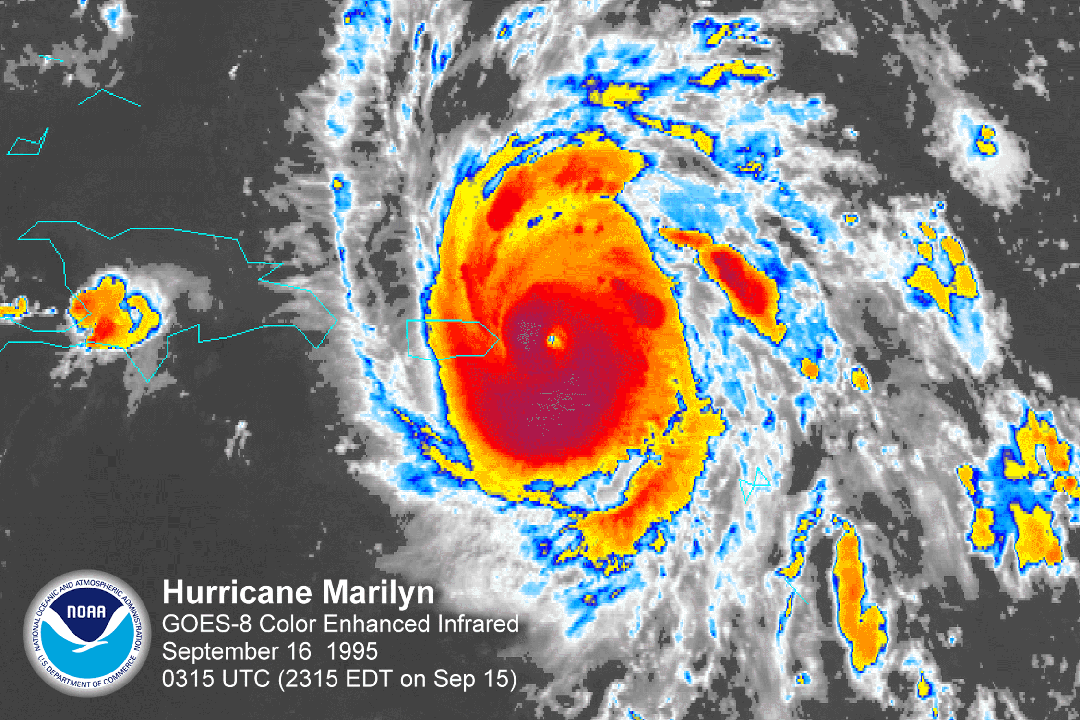
Hurricane Marilyn near Puerto Rico

A low had formed near Marilyn, which may have enhanced outflow from the system. An eye formed in the center of Marilyn, and the storm reached a peak intensity of 949 millibars and winds of 115 mph (185 km/h), a lower-end Category 3 hurricane. At this time, Marilyn was predicted to peak in wind speeds of 120–125 mph (193–201 km/h). Reconnaissance data found a concentric pair of eyewall wind maxima. Marilyn started weakening rapidly, falling from peak-level winds of 141 mph (227 km/h) down to 102 mph (164 km/h). The central pressure also rose up 20 mbars in only 10 hours. This rapid weakening was caused by westerly shear and dry air entrained in the system, a decaying eyewall, and especially cool waters upwelled from the previous powerful storm, Hurricane Luis. As Marilyn weakened to Category 1 hurricane status and moved north-northwest, it passed about 174 mi (280 km) west of Bermuda on September 19. As Marilyn encountered more westerly shear, it weakened to below hurricane status and made its extratropical transition on September 20, centered in the northeastern Atlantic. The remnant circulation continued to erratically move through the central Atlantic Ocean for another 10 days before being absorbed by a frontal low on September 30.

A Hurricane Hunter reconnaissance flight reported hail, which is unusual for tropical cyclones.

== Preparations ==
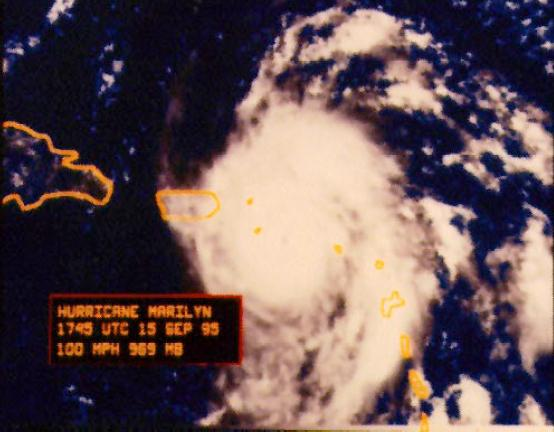
Hurricane Marilyn on crossing the Virgin Islands on September 15, 1995.

Seventeen watches and/or warnings were issued in association with Marilyn. The first two were a tropical storm watch and a tropical storm warning issued on Barbados, St. Vincent, Grenadines, St. Lucia and Grenada on September 12 at 2200 UTC. Five hours later, a tropical storm watch was issued for Trinidad and Tobago. A tropical storm warning was issued for St. Lucia, St. Vincent, Grenadines, Grenada and Tobago at 900 UTC September 13. At 2100 UTC, a Hurricane Warning was issued for Barbados, St. Vincent, Grenadines, St. Lucia and a hurricane watch for Dominica. A hurricane watch as released for Martinique on September 14. The 2100 UTC September 13 was extended for the Grenadines through St. Martin, except Guadeloupe, St. Barthelemy and French portion of St. Martin. At 1500 UTC, Puerto Rico was put under a Hurricane Watch. At 1700 UTC, Guadeloupe, St. Barthelemy, and French portion of St. Martin were put under a hurricane watch. Four hours later, Puerto Rico, U.S. and British Virgin Islands, and Guadeloupe were put under a hurricane warning.

Throughout the night, several watches and warnings were discontinued. At 1500 UTC September 15, Dominican Republic from Cabrera to Cabo Engano were put under a hurricane watch as Marilyn approached. During the night of September 16, all currently active watches and warnings were discontinued. At around the same time, a new Hurricane watch was released for Turks and Caicos and Mayaguana, Acklins, and the Crooked Islands of the southeastern Bahamas. This warning was discontinued within 48 hours. At 1500 UTC September 18, Bermuda came under a Tropical Storm Watch, which was upgraded to a warning in six hours. The warning was discontinued on September 19.

The 250,000 residents of Barbados spent the night of September 13 in shelters.

== Impact ==
Impact by country or region
County/Region	Deaths	Damage	Source
St. Thomas	5	$1.5 billion	
St. Croix	1	$350 million	
St. John	1	$150 million	
Puerto Rico	1	$300 million	
Unknown	5		
Total	13	~$2.3 billion	

Marilyn caused about $2.3 billion and 13 deaths throughout the United States Virgin Islands and Puerto Rico. The exact figure for damages in the U.S. Virgin Islands and Puerto Rico is not available, although the American Insurance Services Group set the combined damage at $875 million. Aside from high winds and seas, one possible explanation for the storm's heavy damage may have been complacency on the part of local island populations. Marilyn struck a mere 10‑days after Luis, a more powerful Category 4 hurricane initially predicted to pass very close to St. Thomas. This prediction prompted locals to be particularly thorough in their pre-storm preparations; however, Luis passed further away from the island and caused relatively moderate damage. Virgin Islanders questioned the accuracy of the National Hurricane Center wind advisories, as Hurricane Marilyn caused significant damage for a mere "category 2" storm. Damage on St. Thomas was remiscent of the damage seen on St. Croix in 1989, when Hurricane Hugo, a category 4 storm, caused catastrophic damage. Because St. Thomas is a very hilly island, it is possible that sustained winds on exposed hills (some of which have elevations that are thousands of feet above sea level) were significantly stronger than the sea-level wind speed estimates given by the hurricane center in its main advisory. Residents also reported tornado vortices in certain neighborhoods.

=== Martinique ===
Rainfalls in Martinique peaked at 9.06 in (230 mm) in Morne Rouge, 8.94 in (227 mm) in Ajoupa Bouillon, 6.4 in (160 mm) in Saint Pierre, ranging as low as 6 in (150 mm) in Ducos. The highest wind gust reported was 80 mph (130 km/h) in Trinite, the location of the only recorded sustained winds in Martinique, which was 58 mph (93 km/h).

=== Guadeloupe ===
Wettest tropical cyclones and their remnants in Guadeloupe Highest-known totals
Precipitation			Storm	Location	Ref.
Rank	mm	in	Storm	Location	Ref.
1	582	22.91	Luis 1995	Dent de l'est (Soufrière)	
2	534	21.02	Fiona 2022	Saint-Claude	
3	508	20.00	Marilyn 1995	Saint-Claude	
4	466	18.35	Lenny 1999	Gendarmerie	
5	416	16.38	Philippe 2023	Vieux-Fort	
6	389	15.31	Hugo 1989		
7	318	12.52	Hortense 1996	Maison du Volcan	
8	300	11.81	Jeanne 2004		
9	223.3	8.79	Cleo 1964	Deshaies	
10	200	7.87	Erika 2009		

Hurricane Marilyn moved directly across Îles des Saintes and the southern part of Basse-Terre Island in the night of September 14–15, 1995, bringing the highest known rainfall totals to the island from a tropical cyclone. Rainfalls over 12-hours in Guadeloupe were up to 20 in (510 mm) in Saint-Claude, 19.09 in (485 mm) in Guillard-Basse-Terre and 17.63 in (448 mm) in Gaba. The highest wind gust reported in Guadeloupe was 84 mph (135 km/h) in Marie-Galante. The next ones were near 52 mph (84 km/h) in Raizet with maximal wind gust at 68 and 61 mph (109 and 98 km/h) in Desirade. Minimal pressure recorded at 989 mbar (29.2 inHg) in Basse-Terre.

Damage was moderate in the south, due to the massive amount of rainfall. Marilyn was one of the three hurricanes that affected the region in 1995, after Iris and Luis; the total estimated damage was near 500 million francs.

=== U.S. Virgin Islands ===
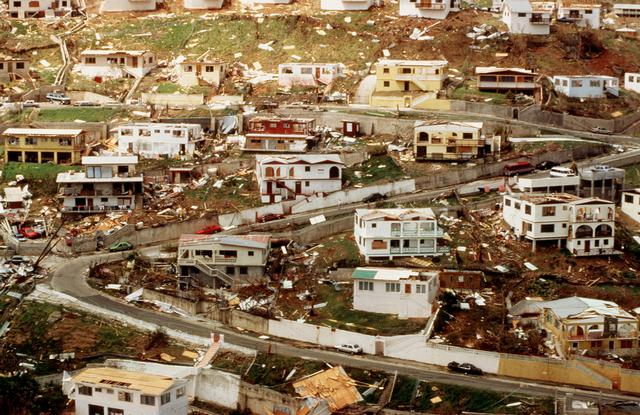
Marilyn damage in St. Thomas

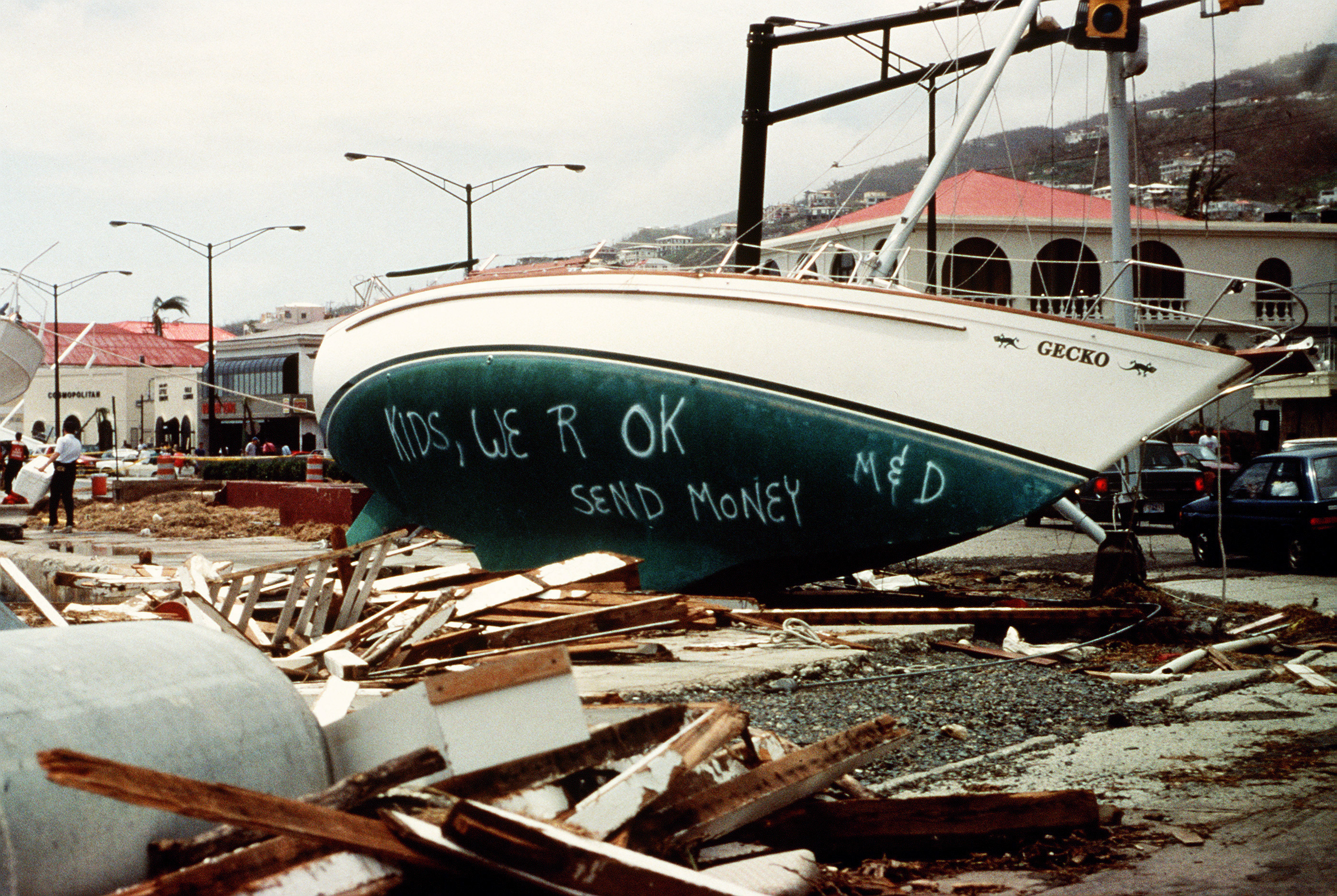
Beached sailboat on St. Thomas used as a billboard

The highest wind speed left by Marilyn after passing over the island of St. Croix was 100 mph (160 km/h). The highest rainfalls reported were 11.67 in (296 mm) in Annually, 9.96 in (253 mm) in Red Hook Bay and 5.25 in (133 mm) in Granard. The highest storm surge reported was 6.6 ft (2.0 m) in St. Thomas and 6.0 ft (1.8 m) in St. Croix. According to NOAA, The storm surge in the U.S. Virgin Islands reached 6 to 7 ft (2.1 m), with an isolated storm tide of 11.7 ft (3.6 m) reported on St. Croix. In St. Croix and St. Thomas, rainfall totals reached about 10 in.

The highest reported gusts were 129 mph (208 km/h) in a Noncommissioned Automated Surface Observing System and 95 mph (153 km/h) gusts in Sailboat Puffin at Green Cay. The highest sustained winds were 105 mph (169 km/h) in a Noncommissioned Automated Surface Observing System. Marilyn was directly responsible for seven deaths, most due to drowning on boats or offshore. Ten thousand people were left homeless on St. Thomas, and most buildings sustained some damage.

The island of St. Thomas was the hardest hit by the storm, where about 80% of the homes and businesses were damaged or destroyed, including the hospital and the water desalination plant; five people were killed. Storm surge in the Charlotte Amalie harbor beached the USCGC Point Ledge and damaged many smaller boats. Elsewhere in the territory, there was moderate to severe damage on St. Croix and St. John. The Federal Emergency Management Agency (FEMA) estimated $1 billion in losses, while an economic research group in the U.S. Virgin Islands set the damage toll at $3 billion. Additionally, losses on St. Thomas were about $1.5 billion and for a total of $2 billion in the three U.S. Virgin Islands.

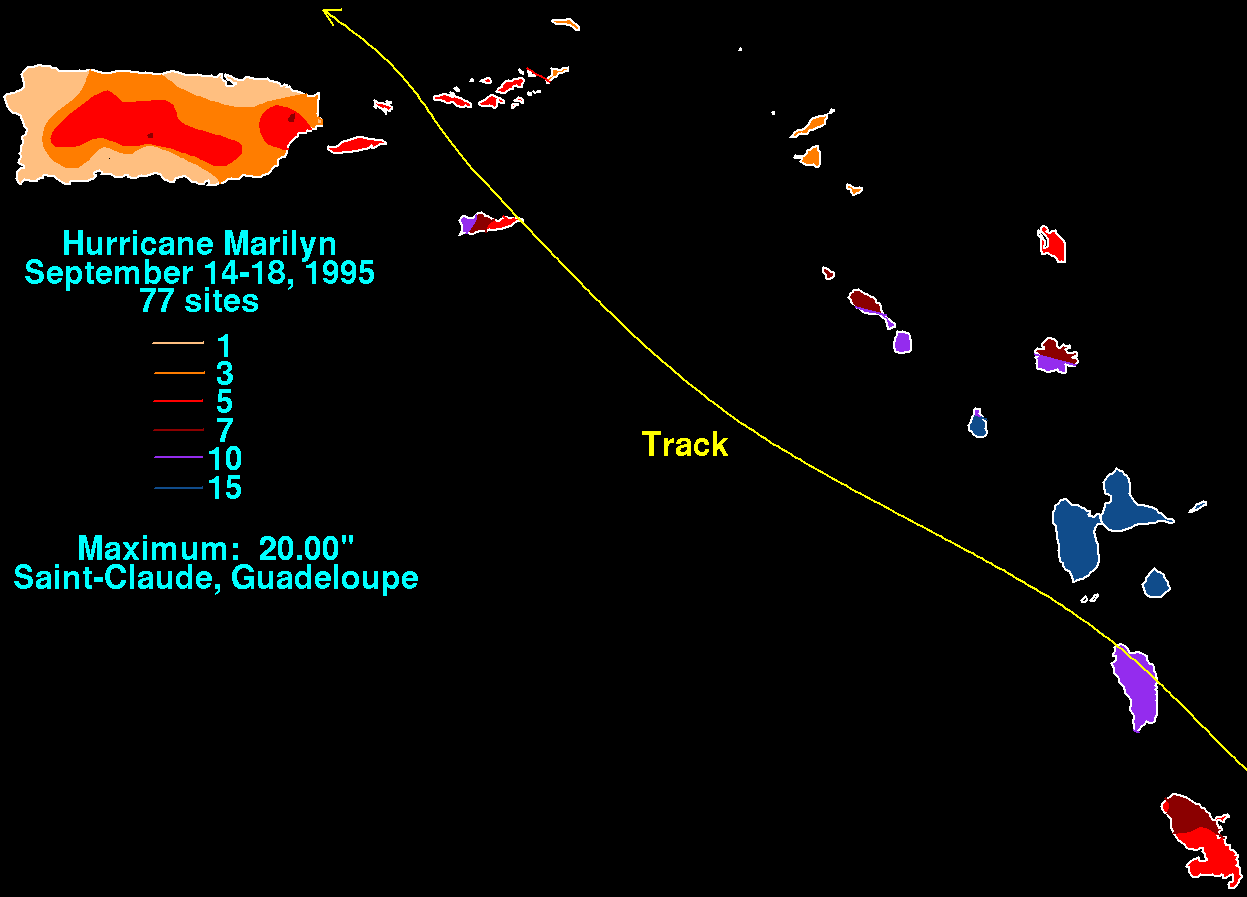
Marilyn Rainfall

=== Puerto Rico ===
The highest rainfalls reported in Puerto Rico from Hurricane Marilyn were 5.6 in (140 mm) in Naguabo, 5.5 in (140 mm) in Luquillo Pico Del Este (Luquillo Pico Of the East), 2.52 in (64 mm) at Luis Muñoz International Airport, and 2.45 in (62 mm) at Roosevelt Roads Naval Station. The highest gusts reported were 125 mph (201 km/h) in Culebra, 60 mph (97 km/h) at Roosevelt Roads Naval Station and 50 mph (80 km/h) at a non-commissioned Automated Surface Observing System. The highest recorded sustained winds was 41 mph (66 km/h) at Roosevelt Roads Naval Station. Marilyn passed over the islands of Vieques and Culebra, where it caused much damage.

There were reports of extensive flash flooding across northern and eastern Puerto Rico, and 12,000 people were forced to ride out the storm in shelters. One person was killed in Culebra. President Bill Clinton declared Puerto Rico a federal disaster area, making it available to federal aid.

100 homes on Culebra Island, 20 miles (32 km) east of Puerto Rico, were destroyed by Marilyn. Another two hundred homes on the island were damaged.

=== Antigua ===
The highest reported gust in Antigua was 50 mph (80 km/h). The Antigua Meteorological Service reported that the island had extensive flooding and damage to banana trees. The other damage reported was from the wind.

=== Other areas ===
Bermuda reported sustained winds of 45 mph and a highest gust of 60 mph (97 km/h). Antigua reported sustained winds of just 35 mph (56 km/h), tropical depression-strength. In St. Maarten, sustained winds were 42.5 mph (68.4 km/h) and the peak gust was 61 mph (98 km/h). Rainfalls in St. Maarten peaked at 3.35 in (85 mm) in an unknown location. The New York Times reported that the British Virgin Islands had little to no damage from Marilyn. The highest gust in Saint-Barthelemy was 59 mph (95 km/h) and the highest sustained winds of 45 mph (72 km/h) was reported.

== Aftermath ==
=== Puerto Rico ===
Relief supplies in the wake of Hurricane Marilyn were sent to Puerto Rico and the U.S. Virgin Islands. Officials of FEMA set up camps on the islands to give out food, water and shelter supplies.

=== U.S. Virgin Islands ===
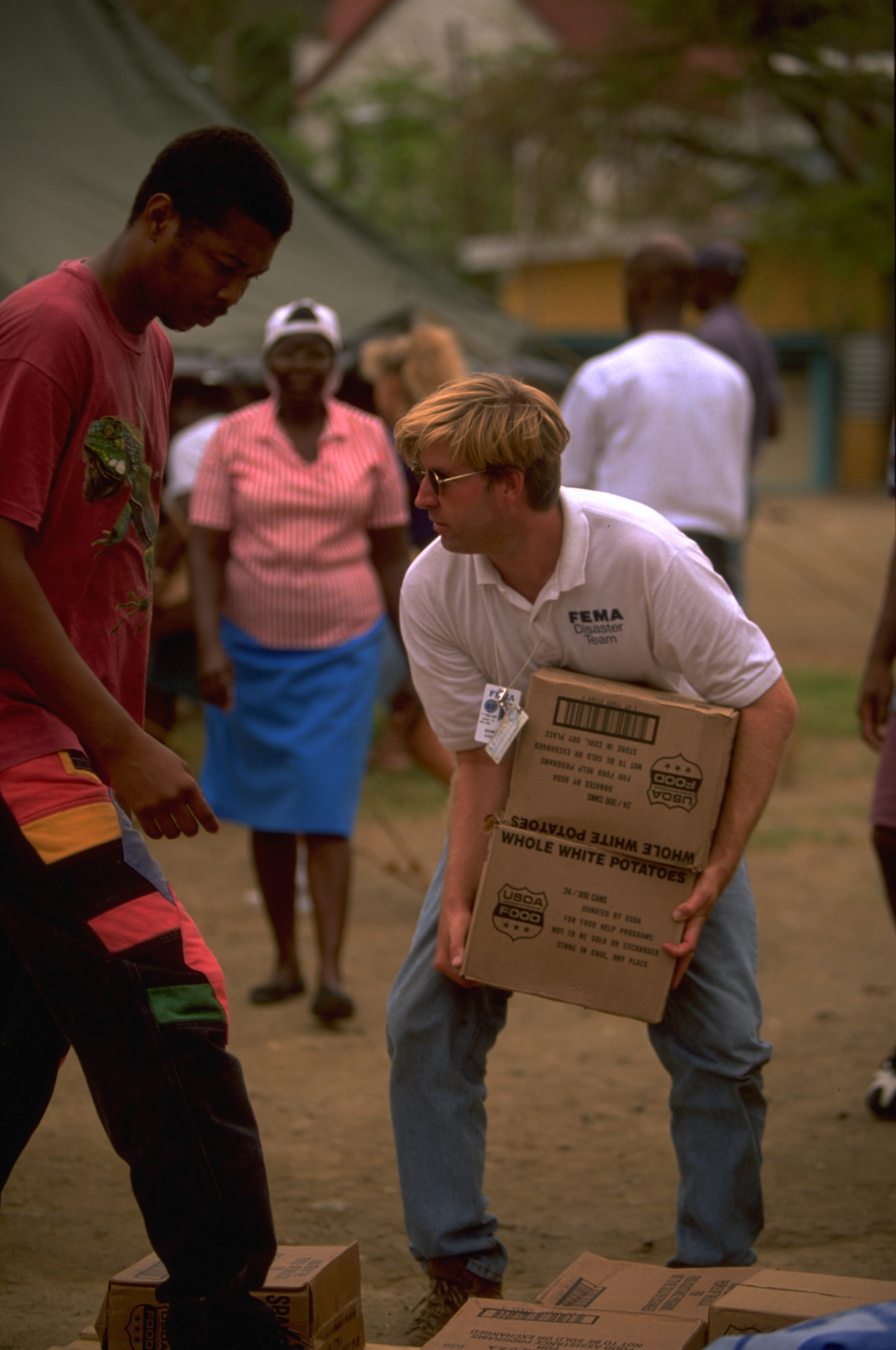
FEMA distributed food, water, clothing in the U.S. Virgin Islands.

President of the United States Bill Clinton declared the U.S. Virgin Islands a federal disaster area, making it available to federal aid. However, the National Guard did not appear on St. Thomas until two days following the hurricane, and FEMA did not appear until three days following. In the meantime, significant looting, particularly of grocery stores, prevented an orderly distribution of food and water. Five supply distribution sites were being operated by the Virgin Islands Territorial Emergency Management Agency (VITEMA). More than 2,100 federal agency personnel had been deployed to help out with the cleanup from Hurricane Marilyn. Four contracts were quickly accepted for immediate building repairs. Diving teams were sent to check for harbor damage and United States Navy Seabees started working on repairing public buildings. Military and security forces included about 500 Army, Air Force, and Navy personnel, 500 National Guardsmen, and 500 federal law enforcement personnel. The airport in St. Thomas was open for flight using a mobile control tower. The St. Thomas hospital was open, but was running on generators.

The first FEMA Disaster Recovery Centers opened on September 23 on St. Thomas. A reported indicated that by October 11, 1500 loans were granted for home repair, mostly for under $2500. More than 19,000 disaster housing applications were filed, with over 2800 being accepted. About 5000 of 15,000 assigned inspections were completed. Over 7800 applications for Individual and Family Grants had been received and, of the 4,000 SBA loan applications filed, 43 had been approved for a total of $744,100 – an average loan of $17,300.

=== Retirement ===
Due to the destruction caused by the hurricane, the name Marilyn was retired in the spring of 1996 by the World Meteorological Organization, and will never again be used for a North Atlantic tropical storm. It was replaced with Michelle for the 2001 season.

== See also ==
- Other storms of the same name
- Timeline of the 1995 Atlantic hurricane season
- Tropical cyclones in 1995
