= List of storms named Meena =

The name Meena has been used for two tropical cyclones in the South Pacific Ocean:

- Cyclone Meena (1989) – a Category 2 tropical cyclone that crossed into the Australian region and made landfall in Queensland.
- Cyclone Meena (2005) – a Category 5 severe tropical cyclone that became the first of four tropical cyclones to impact the Cook Islands during February 2005.

== See also ==
- List of storms named Mina – a similar name that has been used in the Western Pacific Ocean.
