= Storm Poly =

Hybrid cyclone over the North Sea in 2023

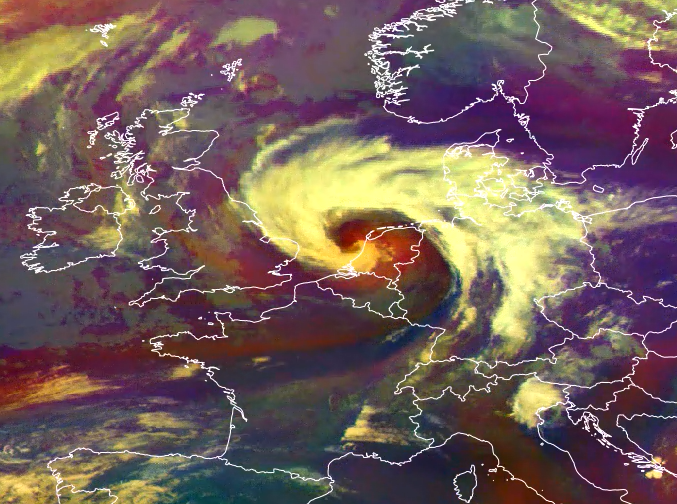
- Poly at peak intensity on 5 July 2023.

Meteorological history
- Formed: 4 July 2023
- Dissipated: 7 July 2023

Extratropical cyclone
- Highest winds: 110 km/h (70 mph)
- Highest gusts: 150 km/h (95 mph)
- Lowest pressure: 985 hPa (mbar); 29.09 inHg

Overall effects
- Fatalities: 2
- Damage: >€50 million (2023)
- Areas affected: United Kingdom, Belgium, Netherlands, Germany
- Part of the 2022-23 European windstorm season

Storm Poly, also known as Cyclone Poly, was a powerful European windstorm and a rare summertime cyclone. The storm affected the Benelux, Germany, and the United Kingdom during July 2023. The thirty-seventh windstorm of the 2022–23 European windstorm season, Poly was named by the Free University of Berlin on 4 July.

It later became the most intense summer storm to impact the Netherlands since the start of the measurements, peaking at 148 km/h (92 mph) in IJmuiden. In Germany, lesser winds of 80–97 kilometres per hour (50–60 mph) were recorded. In total, two fatalities occurred: one in the Netherlands, and another in Germany. Poly caused at least €50,000,000 (2023) in damages.

According to a research conducted by the Utrecht University and the Royal Dutch Meteorological Institute, Poly could be classified as a hybrid cyclone.

== Preparations and impacts ==
=== The Netherlands ===
The Netherlands was affected the most by the storm. A red wind warning was issued for the provinces of North Holland, Flevoland and Friesland as strong gusts were expected. In the Schiphol Airport in Amsterdam, around 400 flights were canceled. Hundreds were stranded in Amsterdam's central station since several domestic and overseas rail services were cancelled. In the morning of 5 July, an emergency alert was issued in the province of Noord-Holland and residents were urged to stay at home.

Hurricane-force wind gusts were measured in the province of Noord-Holland, causing large amounts of damage. Poly was the first very severe storm in the Netherlands since 18 January 2018 and the strongest storm in the Netherlands since 1990. It was also the first very severe storm in the summer since the start of the measurements. The storm was responsible for local floodings in the Netherlands. Over 25,000 households lost electricity due to Storm Poly. Around 1,100 trees in the municipality of Beverwijk fell. Park Westerhout, which is located in the municipality of Beverwijk, was closed for over a month due to the impact caused by Poly. Multiple beach cottages were leveled to the ground in IJmuiden. The roof of a house in Egmond aan Zee collapsed. All beach cottages in Egmond aan Zee were blown over. Multiple cars were damaged in Egmond aan Zee. Fences, roofs, and cars were damaged in the municipality of Uitgeest. A row of trees were blown over and blocked the A9 motorway. A pavilion in Castricum was damaged by Poly. The residents of 24 apartments in Heemskerk were evacuated. The facade of a sports hall in Beverwijk collapsed. A car and a bus in Heemskerk were severely damaged. 130 incidents were reported in the municipality of Heemskerk. Poly caused water supply issues at some locations in the province of Noord-Holland, lasting for up to a week.

=== Germany ===
The Deutscher Wetterdienst issued a level-three red warning for most of northern Germany, including Hamburg. High-speed rail services to Cologne and Hamburg were cut off. Additionally, some ferries from Germany to islands off the north coast were canceled, while powerful gusts toppled trees, disrupting a line between Hamburg and Sylt.

=== United Kingdom And Belgium ===
The precursor low-pressure area to Poly would produce heavy rain for East Anglia, causing a game in Wimbledon to be postponed. In Belgium, the Royal Meteorological Institute issued a code-yellow alert for all of the Flemish provinces, excluding Flemish Brabant, on 5 July. When Poly affected Belgium, it primarily brought severe thunderstorms and locally intense gusts to the nation.

== Highest wind gust per country ==
Country	Gust	Location
Belgium	114 km/h (71 mph)	De Panne
Germany	119 km/h (74 mph)	Leuchtturm Alte Weser
Netherlands	148 km/h (92 mph)	IJmuiden
United Kingdom	150 km/h (93 mph)	Lowestoft
