= European windstorm =

Strongest type of extratropical cyclone that occurs over Europe

24-hour animation of Cyclone Xynthia crossing France

European windstorms are powerful extratropical cyclones which form as cyclonic windstorms associated with areas of low atmospheric pressure. They can occur throughout the year, but are most frequent between October and March, with peak intensity in the winter months. Deep areas of low pressure are common over the North Atlantic, and occasionally start as nor'easters off the New England coast. They frequently track across the North Atlantic Ocean towards the north of Scotland and into the Norwegian Sea, which generally minimizes the impact to inland areas; however, if the track is further south, it may cause adverse weather conditions across Central Europe, Northern Europe and especially Western Europe. The countries most commonly affected include the United Kingdom, Ireland, the Netherlands, Norway, Germany, the Faroe Islands and Iceland.

The strong wind phenomena intrinsic to European windstorms, that give rise to "damage footprints" at the surface, can be placed into three categories, namely the "warm jet", the "cold jet" and the "sting jet". These phenomena vary in terms of physical mechanisms, atmospheric structure, spatial extent, duration, severity level, predictability and location relative to cyclone and fronts.

On average, these storms cause economic damage of around €1.9 billion per year and insurance losses of €1.4 billion per year (1990–1998). They cause the highest amount of natural catastrophe insurance loss in Europe.

== Cyclogenesis ==
=== North Atlantic Oscillation ===
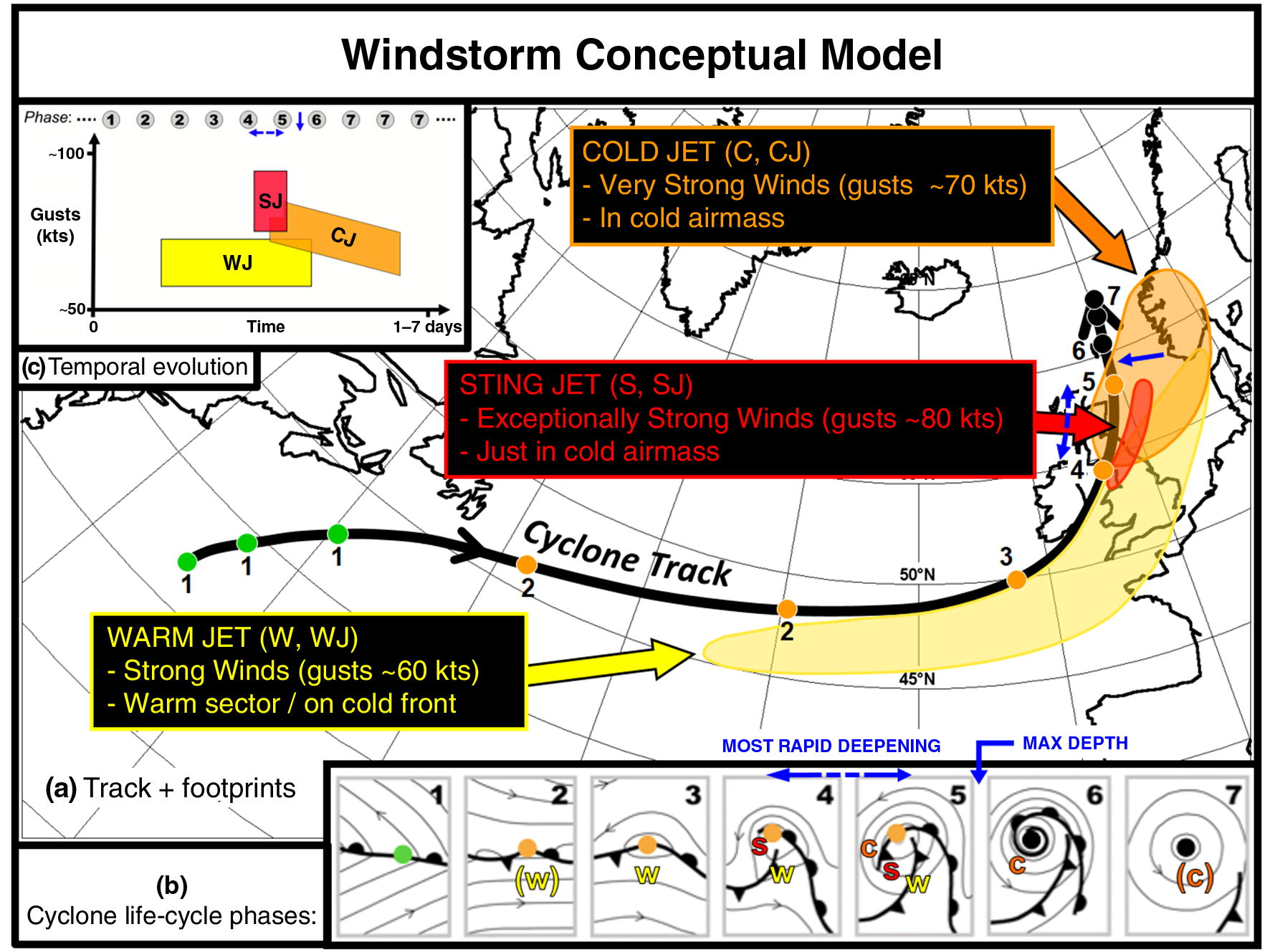
Conceptual model for a European Windstorm and the associated strong wind "footprints". Storm track, footprint locations and footprint sizes vary by case, and that all footprints are not always present.

The state of the North Atlantic Oscillation relates strongly to the frequency, intensity, and tracks of European windstorms. An enhanced number of storms have been noted over the North Atlantic region during positive NAO phases (compared to negative NAO phases) and is due to larger areas of suitable growth conditions. The occurrence of extreme North Atlantic cyclones is aligned with the NAO state during the cyclones' development phase. The strongest storms are embedded within, and form in large scale atmospheric flow. It should be kept in mind that, on the other hand, the cyclones themselves play a major role in steering the NAO phase. Aggregate European windstorm losses show a strong dependence on NAO, with losses increasing/decreasing 10–15% at all return periods.

=== Connection to North American cold spells ===
A connection between wintertime cold air outbreaks in North America and European windstorms has been hypothesized in the last years. Cold spells over Central Canada and Eastern US appear to be associated with more frequent windstorms and flash floods over Iberia, whereas cold spells over Eastern Canada show a connection to windstorms over Northern Europe and the British Isles. The reason behind those teleconnections is not fully clear yet, but changes in the behavior of the Polar jet stream are likely to be at least related to this effect.

=== Clustering ===
Temporal clustering of windstorm events has also been noted, with eight consecutive storms hitting Europe during the winter of 1989/90. Cyclones Lothar and Martin in 1999 were separated by only 36 hours. Cyclone Kyrill in 2007 followed only four days after Cyclone Per. In November 2011, Cyclone Berit moved across Northern Europe, and just a day later another storm, named Yoda, hit the same area.

This occurred during the 2025–26 European windstorm season, when a succession of storms—specifically Storm Joseph, Storm Kristin, Storm Leonardo, and Storm Marta—impacted the Iberian Peninsula from late January to early February. While these four formed a distinct sequence, other storms also affected the region during the season, including Storm Harry and Storm Pedro.

== Nomenclature ==
=== Naming of individual storms ===
Up to the second half of the 19th century, European windstorms were usually named either by the year, the date, or the Saint's day of their occurrence. Although standardised naming schemes now exist, a storm may still be named differently in different countries. For instance, the Norwegian weather service also names independently notable storms that affect Norway, which can result in multiple names being used in different countries they affect, such as:

- The 1999 storm called "Anatol" in Germany is known as the "December hurricane" or "Adam" in Denmark and as "Carola" in Sweden.
- The 2011 storm called "Dagmar" in Norway and Sweden is known as "Patrick" in Germany and "Tapani" in Finland.
- The 2013 event known as the St. Jude storm in the English media is known as Christian in German and French (following the Free University of Berlin's Adopt-a-Vortex program). It was named Simone by the Swedish Meteorological and Hydrological Institute, and referred to as the October storm in Danish and Dutch. It was later given the name Allan by the Danish Meteorological Institute following the political decision to name strong storms which affect Denmark.

In 2011, a social media campaign resulted in the storm officially called Cyclone Friedhelm being widely referred to as Hurricane Bawbag and Hurricane Fannybaws. Such usage of the term Hurricane is not without precedent, as the 1968 Scotland storm was referred to as "Hurricane Low Q".

==== UK and Ireland ====
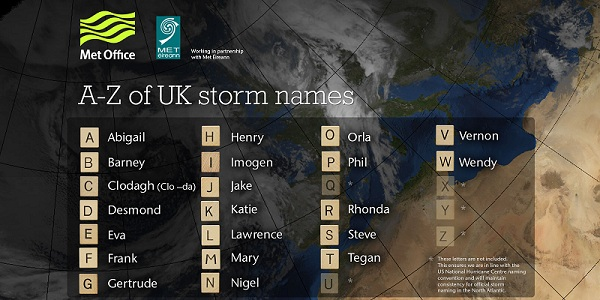
2015 list of storm names from UK Met Office and Met Éireann

The UK Met Office and Ireland's Met Éireann held discussions about developing a common naming system for Atlantic storms. In 2015 a pilot project by the two forecasters was launched as "Name our storms" which sought public participation in naming large-scale cyclonic windstorms affecting the UK and/or Ireland over the winter of 2015/16. The UK/Ireland storm naming system began its first operational season in 2015/2016, with Storm Abigail.

==== Germany ====
During 1954, Karla Wege, a student at the Free University of Berlin's meteorological institute suggested that names should be assigned to all areas of low and high pressure that influenced the weather of Central Europe. The university subsequently started to name every area of high or low pressure within its weather forecasts, from a list of 260 male and 260 female names submitted by its students. The female names were assigned to areas of low pressure while male names were assigned to areas of high pressure. The names were subsequently exclusively used by Berlin's media until February 1990, after which the German media started to commonly use the names, however, they were not officially approved by the German Meteorological Service Deutscher Wetterdienst. The DWD subsequently banned the usage of the names by their offices during July 1991, after complaints had poured in about the naming system. However, the order was leaked to the German press agency, Deutsche Presse-Agentur, who ran it as its lead weather story. Germany's ZDF television channel subsequently ran a phone in poll on 17 July 1991 and claimed that 72% of the 40,000 responses favored keeping the names. This made the DWD pause and think about the naming system and these days the DWD accept the naming system and request that it is maintained.

During 1998 a debate started about whether it was discriminatory to name areas of high pressure with male names and the areas of low pressure with female names. The issue was subsequently resolved by alternating male and female names each year. In November 2002 the "Adopt-a-Vortex" scheme began, which allows members of the public or companies to buy naming rights for a letter chosen by the buyer that are then assigned alphabetically to high and low pressure areas in Europe during each year. The naming comes with the slim chance that the system will be notable. The money raised by this is used by the meteorology department to maintain weather observations at the Free University.

Names are listed alphabetically beginning in January.

=== Name of phenomena ===
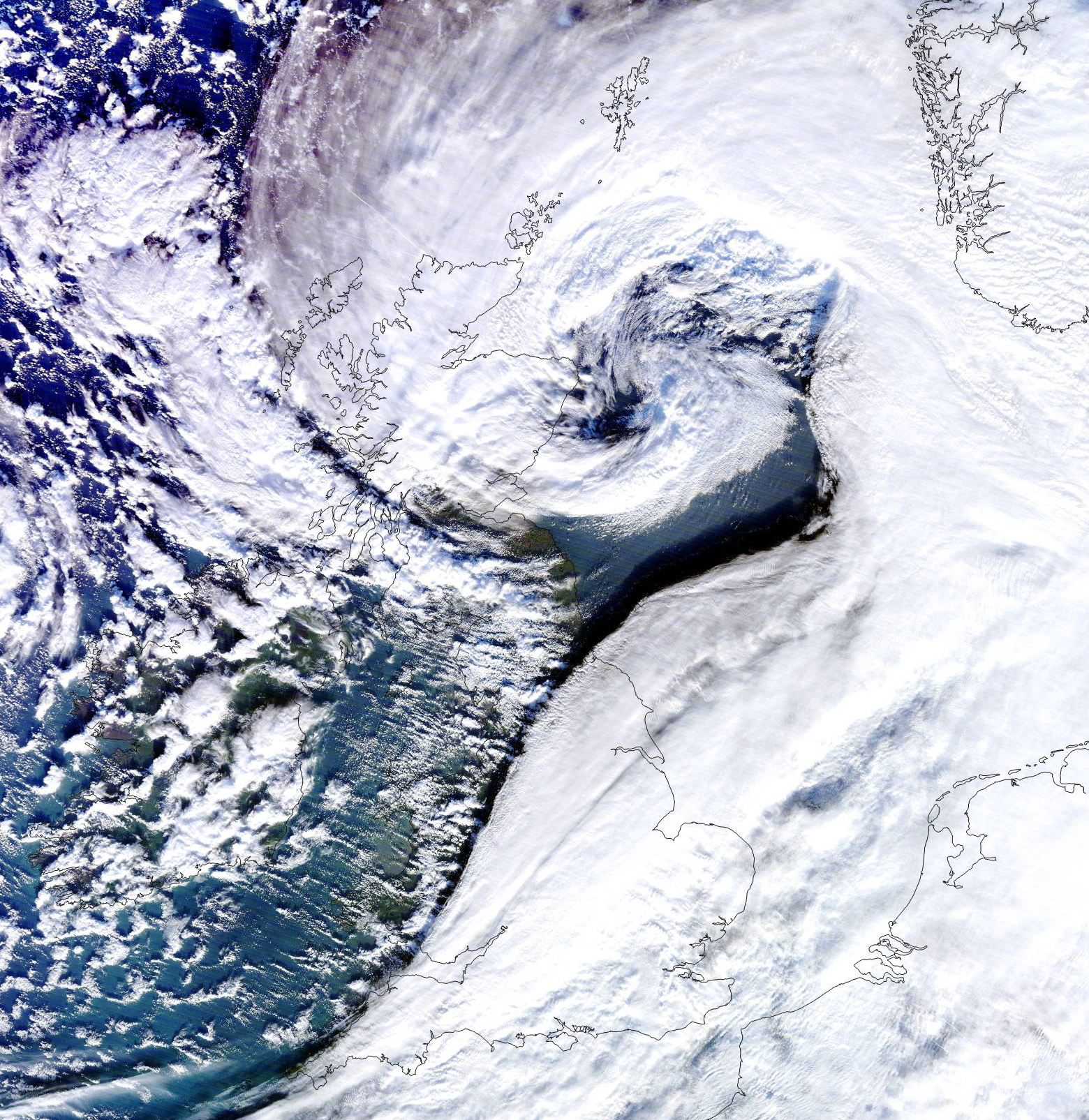
Satellite picture of Cyclone Ulli on 3 January 2012

Several European languages use cognates of the word huracán (ouragan, uragano, orkan, huragan, orkaan, ураган, which may or may not be differentiated from tropical hurricanes in these languages) to indicate particularly strong cyclonic winds occurring in Europe. The term hurricane as applied to these storms is not in reference to the structurally different tropical cyclone of the same name, but to the hurricane strength of the wind on the Beaufort scale (winds ≥ 118 km/h or ≥ 73 mph).

In English, use of term hurricane to refer to European windstorms is mostly discouraged, as these storms do not display the structure of tropical storms. Likewise the use of the French term ouragan is similarly discouraged as hurricane is in English, as it is typically reserved for tropical storms only. European windstorms in Latin Europe are generally referred to by derivatives of tempestas (tempest, tempête, tempestade, tempesta), meaning storm, weather, or season, from the Latin tempus, meaning time.

Globally storms of this type forming between 30° and 60° latitude are known as extratropical cyclones. The name European windstorm reflects that these storms in Europe are primarily notable for their strong winds and associated damage, which can span several nations on the continent. The strongest cyclones are called windstorms within academia and the insurance industry. The name European windstorm has not been adopted by the UK Met Office in broadcasts (though it is used in their academic research), the media or by the general public, and appears to have gained currency in academic and insurance circles as a linguistic and terminologically neutral name for the phenomena.

In contrast to some other European languages there is a lack of a widely accepted name for these storms in English. The Met Office and UK media generally refer to these storms as severe gales. The current definition of severe gales (which warrants the issue of a weather warning) are repeated gusts of 70 mph (110 km/h) or more over inland areas. European windstorms are also described in forecasts variously as winter storms, winter lows, autumnal lows, Atlantic lows and cyclonic systems. They are also sometimes referred to as bullseye isobars and dartboard lows in reference to their appearance on weather charts. A Royal Society exhibition has used the name European cyclones, with North-Atlantic cyclone and North-Atlantic windstorms also being used. Though with the advent of the "Name our Storms" project, they are generally known as storms.

== Naming groups ==
Since 2015, the naming of high-impact windstorms has been coordinated by several regional groups within the EUMETNET framework. Each group maintains its own alphabetical list of names for each season.

Group Name	Participating Countries/Services	Established
Western Group	(United Kingdom) Met Office (Republic of Ireland) Met Éireann (Netherlands) KNMI	2015
South-western Group	Météo-France (Spain) AEMET (Portugal) IPMA (Belgium) RMI (Luxembourg) MeteoLux	2017
Northern Group	MET Norway (Sweden) SMHI (Denmark) DMI	2015
Central Mediterranean Group	(Italy) Servizio Meteorologico (Slovenia) ARSO (Croatia) DHMZ (Montenegro) IHMS; Met Office Malta	2021
South-eastern Group	(Greece) HNMS (Cyprus) DoM (Israel) IMS	2021

== Economic impact ==
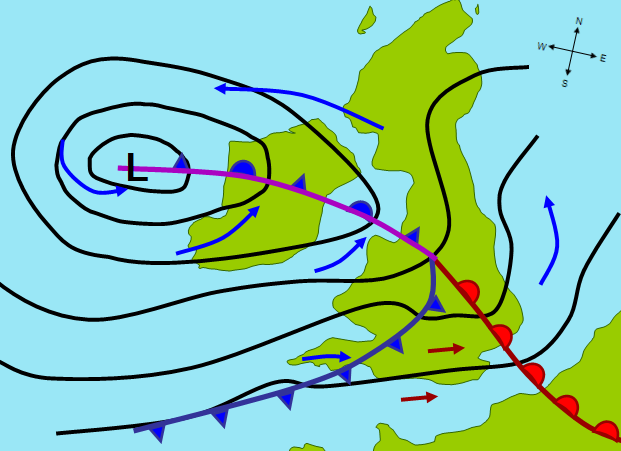
A fictitious synoptic chart of an extratropical cyclone affecting the UK & Ireland. The blue and red arrows between isobars indicate the direction of the wind and its relative temperature, while the "L" symbol denotes the center of the "low". Note the occluded cold and warm frontal boundaries.

=== Insurance losses ===
Insurance losses from European windstorms are the second greatest source of loss for any natural peril globally. Only Atlantic hurricanes in the United States are larger. Windstorm losses exceed those caused by flooding in Europe. For instance one windstorm, Kyrill in 2007, exceeded the losses of the 2007 United Kingdom floods. On average, some 200,000 buildings are damaged by high winds in the UK every year.

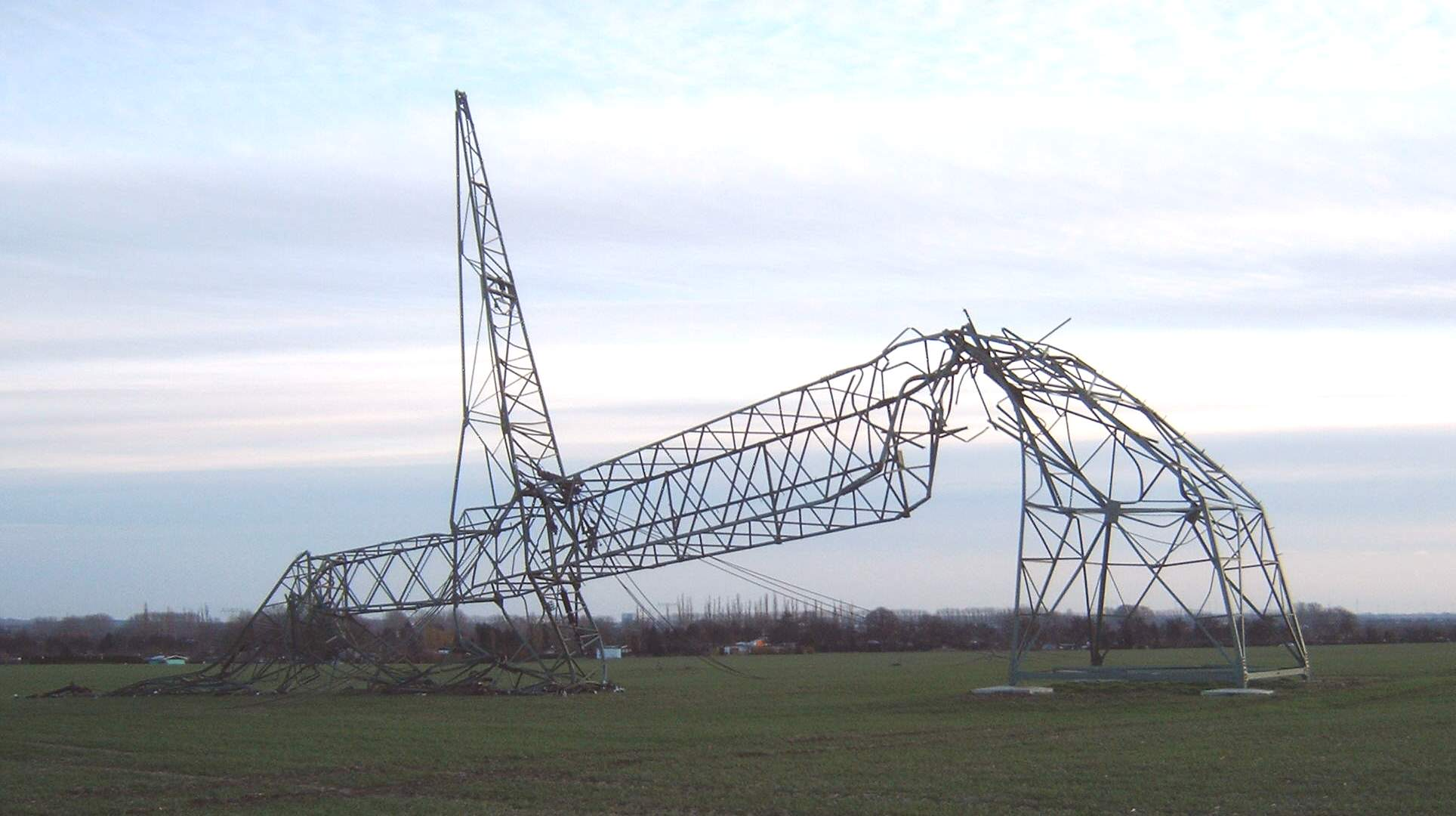
Damaged pylon in Germany after Windstorm Kyrill 2007

=== Energy supplies ===
European windstorms wipe out electrical generation capacity across large areas, making supplementation from abroad difficult (windturbines shut down to avoid damage and nuclear capacity may shut if cooling water is contaminated or flooding of the power plant occurs). Transmission capabilities can also be severely limited if power lines are brought down by snow, ice or high winds. In the wake of Cyclone Gudrun in 2005 Denmark and Latvia had difficulty importing electricity, and Sweden lost 25% of its total power capacity as the Ringhals Nuclear Power Plant and Barsebäck nuclear power plant nuclear plants were shut down.

During the Boxing Day Storm of 1998 the reactors at Hunterston B nuclear power station were shut down when power was lost, possibly due to arcing at pylons caused by salt spray from the sea. When the grid connection was restored, the generators that had powered the station during the blackout were shut down and left on "manual start", so when the power failed again the station was powered by batteries for a short time of around 30 minutes, until the diesel generators were started manually. During this period the reactors were left without forced cooling, in a similar fashion to the Fukushima Daiichi nuclear disaster, but the event at Hunterston was rated as International Nuclear Event Scale 2.

A year later in 1999 during the Lothar storm Flooding at the Blayais Nuclear Power Plant resulted in a "level 2" event on the International Nuclear Event Scale. Cyclone Lothar and Martin in 1999 left 3.4 million customers in France without electricity, and forced Électricité de France to acquire all the available portable power generators in Europe, with some even being brought in from Canada. These storms brought a fourth of France's high-tension transmission lines down and 300 high-voltage transmission pylons were toppled. It was one of the greatest energy disruptions ever experienced by a modern developed country.

Following the Great Storm of 1987 the High Voltage Cross-Channel Link between the UK and France was interrupted, and the storm caused a domino-effect of power outages throughout the Southeast of England. Conversely windstorms can produce too much wind power. Cyclone Xynthia hit Europe in 2010, generating 19000 megawatts of electricity from Germany's 21000 wind turbines. The electricity produced was too much for consumers to use, and prices on the European Energy Exchange in Leipzig plummeted, which resulted in the grid operators having to pay over 18 euros per megawatt-hour to offload it, costing around half a million euros in total.

Disruption of the gas supply during Cyclone Dagmar in 2011 left Royal Dutch Shell's Ormen Lange gas processing plant in Norway inoperable after its electricity was cut off by the storm. This left gas supplies in the United Kingdom vulnerable as this facility can supply up to 20 per cent of the United Kingdom's needs via the Langeled pipeline. However, the disruption came at a time of low demand. The same storm also saw the Leningrad Nuclear Power Plant also affected, as algae and mud stirred up by the storm were sucked into the cooling system, resulting in one of the generators being shut down. A similar situation was reported in the wake of Storm Angus in 2016 (though not linked specifically to the storm) when reactor 1 at Torness Nuclear Power Station in Scotland was taken offline after a sea water intake tripped due to excess seaweed around the inlet. Also following Storm Angus the UK's National Grid launched an investigation into whether a ship's anchor damaged four of the eight cables of the Cross Channel high voltage interconnector, which would leave it only able to operate at half of its capacity until February 2017.

== Notable windstorms ==
=== Historic windstorms ===
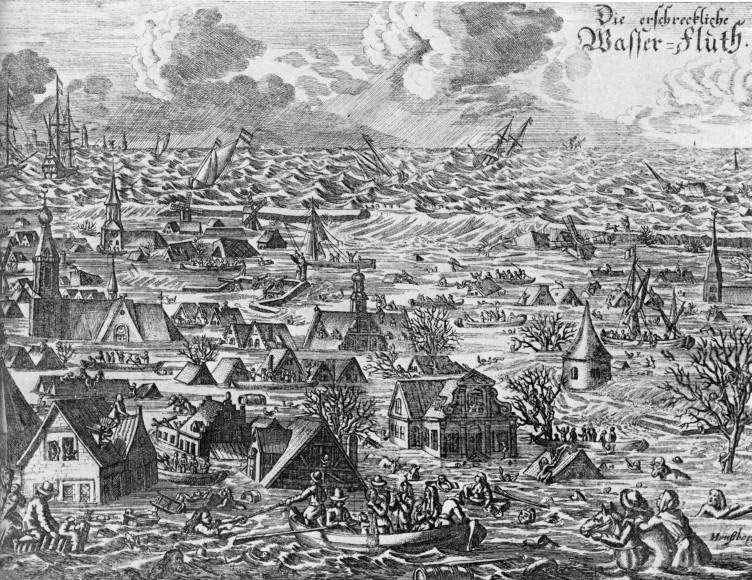
Contemporary picture of the flood that struck the North Sea coast of Germany and Denmark in October 1634.

- Grote Mandrenke, 1362 – A southwesterly Atlantic gale swept across England, the Netherlands, northern Germany and southern Denmark, killing over 25,000 and changing the Dutch-German-Danish coastline.
- Burchardi flood, 1634 – Also known as "second Grote Mandrenke", hit Nordfriesland, drowned about 8,000–15,000 people and destroyed the island of Strand.
- Great Storm of 1703 – Severe gales affect south coast of England.
- Night of the Big Wind, 1839 – The most severe windstorm to hit Ireland in recent centuries, with hurricane-force winds, killed between 250 and 300 people and rendered hundreds of thousands of homes uninhabitable.
- Royal Charter Storm, 25–26 October 1859 – The Royal Charter Storm was considered to be the most severe storm to hit the British Isles in the 19th century, with a total death toll estimated at over 800. It takes its name from the ship Royal Charter, which was driven by the storm onto the east coast of Anglesey, Wales, with the loss of over 450 lives.
- The Tay Bridge Disaster, 1879 – Severe gales (estimated to be Force 10–11) swept the east coast of Scotland, infamously resulting in the collapse of the Tay Rail Bridge and the loss of 75 people who were on board the ill-fated train.
- 1928 Thames flood, 6–7 January 1928 – Snow melt combined with heavy rainfall and a storm surge in the North Sea led to flooding in central London and the loss of 14 lives.

=== Before official naming (1950-2014) ===
Historically, powerful and standout European windstorms were given names before the official naming convention was established.

- North Sea flood of 1953 – Considered to be the worst natural disaster of the 20th century both in the Netherlands and the United Kingdom, claiming over 2,500 lives, including 133 lost when the car ferry MV Princess Victoria sank in the North Channel east of Belfast.
- Great Sheffield Gale and the North Sea flood of 1962 – Powerful windstorm crossed the United Kingdom, killing nine people and devastating the city of Sheffield with powerful winds. The storm then reached the German coast of the North Sea with wind speeds up to 200 km/h. The accompanying storm surge combined with the high tide pushed water up the Weser and Elbe, breaching dikes and caused extensive flooding, especially in Hamburg. 315 people were killed, around 60,000 were left homeless.
- Gale of January 1976 2–5 January 1976 – Widespread wind damage was reported across Europe from Ireland to Central Europe. Coastal flooding occurred in the United Kingdom, Belgium and Germany with the highest storm surge of the 20th century recorded on the German North Sea coast.
- 1979 Fastnet Race – Force 10 to 11 storm forced the retirement or, in several cases, sinking of numerous yachts. Less than a third of the contesting boats finished with 19 killed.
- Great Storm of 1987 – This storm affected southeastern England and northern France. In England maximum mean wind speeds of 70 knots (an average over 10 minutes) were recorded. The highest gust of 117 knots (217 km/h) was recorded at Pointe du Raz in Brittany. In all, 19 people were killed in England and 4 in France. 15 million trees were uprooted in England.
- 1990 storm series – Between 25 January and 1 March 1990, eight severe storms crossed Europe including the Burns' Day storm (Daria), Vivian & Wiebke. The total costs resulting from these storms was estimated at almost €13 billion.
- Braer Storm of January 1993 – the most intense storm of this kind on record.
- Cyclones Lothar and Martin, 1999 – France, Switzerland and Germany were hit by severe storms Lothar (250 km/h (160 mph)), and Martin (198 km/h (123 mph)). 140 people were killed during the storms. Lothar and Martin together left 3.4 million customers in France without electricity. It was one of the greatest energy disruptions ever experienced by a modern developed country. The total costs resulting from both storms was estimated at almost 19.2 billion $US.
- Kyrill, 2007 – Storm warnings were given for many countries in western, central and northern Europe with severe storm warnings for some areas. At least 53 people were killed in northern and central Europe, causing travel chaos across the region.
- Xynthia, 2010 – A severe windstorm moved across the Canary Islands to Portugal and western and northern Spain, before moving on to hit south-western France. The highest gust speeds were recorded at Alto de Orduña, measured at 228 km/h (142 mph). 50 people were reported to have died.

=== Official naming era (2015 – present) ===
Powerful, standout European windstorms were named officially by their respective groups.

- Storm Desmond - 2015 - A catastrophic windstorm which tied with an atmospheric river to produce extreme flooding to parts of the United Kingdom. Red rain warnings were issued for SW Scotland & NW England as well as parts of Ireland. Storm Desmond broke the United Kingdom's 24-hour rainfall record, with 341.4 mm (13.44 in) of rain falling in Honister Pass, Cumbria, on 5 December.
- Storm Doris - 2017 - A strong windstorm that brought power cuts costly damage prompting an amber wind warning for parts of north Wales, central and eastern England.
- Storm David - 2018 - The storm caused an estimated €1.14 billion – €2.6 billion in damage. Wind gusts up to 203 km/h (126 mph) wreaked havoc in UK, The Netherlands, Belgium, and Germany. The death toll reached 15.
- Storm Malik - 2022 - a powerful windstorm named by the Danish. 800,000 power outages in multiple countries. Seven people were killed in the storm, and a total of US$415 million in damages were reported
- Storm Eunice - 2022 - The storm with wind gusts up to 196 km/h (122 mph) killed 17 people in Europe. The storm impacted the UK, the Netherlands, Belgium, France, Denmark, and Poland.
- Storm Ciarán - 2023 - A severe windstorm that struck south-west England and north-western France in early November 2023. Gusts of 207 km/h (129 mph) was recorded in Pointe du Raz, Brittany, France. Many tornadoes were reported during the storm especially in southern England, the Channel Islands and northern France.
- Storm Ingunn - 2024 - An extremely powerful windstorm that brought 155 mph to the Faroe Islands and prompted the issuance of a rare red warning for wind for Norway.
- Storm Darragh - 2024 - A powerful extratropical cyclone which severely impacted Ireland and the United Kingdom in December 2024, prompted the issuance of a rare red wind warning for the Welsh coast from Anglesey to the Severn Estuary and the Somerset and north Devon coasts.
- Storm Éowyn - 2025 - A powerful and record-breaking extratropical cyclone which hit Ireland, the Isle of Man and the United Kingdom. It was the most powerful and severe to hit Ireland since Night of the Big Wind in 1839, with wind records breaking an 80-year-old record for the country. On 23 January 2025, a 'red' emergency alert was sent to mobile devices across Northern Ireland at 17:25 UTC and in parts of Scotland at 17:53 UTC. The alert was broadcast to around 4.5 million devices making it the largest scale use of the UK's emergency alert system since its introduction in April 2023.
- Storm Amy - 2025 - A powerful & destructive windstorm, known for the amount of power outages throughout western and northern Europe (559,665+) as well as a wind gust of 139 mph (224 km/h) at Folgefonna, Norway.
- Storm Johannes - 2025 - A powerful hurricane-forced polar low that caused massive power failure. At the peak, approximately 200,000 households were without power across Sweden, Norway, and Finland.
- Storm Kristin - 2026 - A compact, but very powerful, extratropical cyclone that caused the strongest winds ever recorded in Portugal in January 2026.

=== Other severe storms (FUB) (2015 – present) ===
Extreme storms named by the Free University of Berlin were not given names by any of the official European storm naming groups.

- Storm Eberhard - 2019 - it reached "hurricane-force" gusts in the German lowlands causing over €600 million in damage.
- Storm Poly - 2023 - an extremely violent summer European windstorm. It affected Benelux, Germany and the United Kingdom. It later became the most intense summer storm to impact the Netherlands, bringing destructive gusts to the nation, peaking at 148 km/h (92 mph) in IJmuiden.

=== Most intense storms ===
Most intense extratropical cyclones in the North Atlantic
Rank	Date	Name	Minimum pressure	Reported location
1	January 1993	Braer Storm	914 hectopascals (27.0 inHg)	Between Iceland and Great Britain
2	December 1986	Unnamed	916 hectopascals (27.0 inHg)	South-east of Greenland
3	January 1839	Night of the Big Wind	918 hectopascals (27.1 inHg)	Off the coast of Great Britain
4	December 1989	Unnamed	920 hectopascals (27 inHg)	South-west of Iceland
4	February 2020	Storm Dennis	920 hectopascals (27 inHg)	South of Iceland
6	February 1870	Unnamed	921.1 hectopascals (27.20 inHg)	South-west of Iceland
7	February 1824	Unnamed	924 hectopascals (27.3 inHg)	Reykjavik, Iceland
8	December 1929	Unnamed	925.5 hectopascals (27.33 inHg)	Atlantic Ocean
9	January 1884	Unnamed	925.6 hectopascals (27.33 inHg)	Ochtertyre, Great Britain
10	March 1992	Unnamed	926 hectopascals (27.3 inHg)	Off Newfoundland

=== Strongest wind gusts ===
Top 10 peak wind gusts recorded during European windstorm seasons (2020–present)
Rank	Date	Name	Peak wind gust	Location	Country
1	31 January 2024	Ingunn	249 km/h (155 mph)	Heltnin, Faroe Islands	Faroe Islands
2	29 January 2022	Malik	236 km/h (147 mph)	Cairngorm Summit	United Kingdom
3	17 February 2023	Otto	225 km/h (140 mph)	Cairngorm Summit	United Kingdom
4	3 October 2025	Amy	224 km/h (139 mph)	Folgefonna	Norway
5	1 February 2024	Ingunn	224 km/h (139 mph)	Kvaløyfjellet, Sømna	Norway
6	24 January 2025	Éowyn	217 km/h (135 mph)	Cairnwell	United Kingdom
7	20 October 2020	Barbara	216 km/h (134 mph)	Iraty	France
8	29 January 2026	Kristin	208 km/h (129 mph)	Soure	Portugal
9	2 November 2023	Ciarán	207 km/h (129 mph)	Pointe du Raz, Finistère	France
10	13 December 2025	Goretti	198 km/h (123 mph)	Pointe du Raz, Finistère	France

== See also ==
- List of European windstorms
- Beaufort scale
- Tropical cyclone effects in Europe
- Nor'easter
- List of sting jet cyclones
- List of severe weather phenomena
- Pacific Northwest windstorm
- List of historical European windstorm names

=== European windstorm seasons ===
- 2026–27 European windstorm season
- 2025–26 European windstorm season
- 2024–25 European windstorm season
- 2023-24 European windstorm season
- 2022–23 European windstorm season
- 2021–22 European windstorm season
- 2020–21 European windstorm season
- 2019–20 European windstorm season
- 2018–19 European windstorm season
- 2017–18 European windstorm season
- 2016–17 UK and Ireland windstorm season
- 2015–16 UK and Ireland windstorm season
