= Burns' Day Storm =

1990 windstorm over northwestern Europe

Burns' Day Storm (Daria)
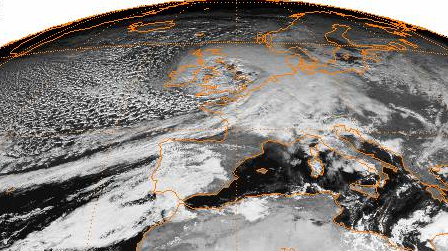
- Burns' Day Storm/Daria 11:30UTC 25 January 1990

Meteorological history
- Formed: 23 January 1990
- Dissipated: 26 January 1990

Extratropical cyclone
- Highest winds: 64 kn (119 km/h; 74 mph), Sheerness, Kent
- Highest gusts: 124 kn (230 km/h; 143 mph), Brocken
- Lowest pressure: 949 hPa (mbar); 28.02 inHg

Overall effects
- Fatalities: 47 UK, 17 Netherlands, 12 France,
- Areas affected: Ireland, United Kingdom, France, Belgium, Netherlands, West Germany, East Germany, Denmark

The Burns' Day Storm (also known as Cyclone Daria) was an extremely violent windstorm that took place on Thursday–Friday 25–26 January 1990 over North-Western Europe. It is one of the strongest European windstorms on record and caused many fatalities, approximately one hundred deaths, with almost half of these on the British Isles alone. The storm caused widespread damage and hurricane-force winds over a wide area.

This storm has received different names, as there was no official list of such events in Europe at the time, although in Britain it was named as it occurred on 'Burns Day', the birthday of the Scottish poet Robert Burns.

== Meteorological history ==
The storm began as a cold front over the Northern Atlantic Ocean on 23 January. By 24 January, it had a minimum central pressure of 992 millibars (29.3 inHg) and began to undergo explosive cyclogenesis, which was sometimes referred to as a weather bomb. It made landfall on the morning of 25 January over Ireland. It then tracked over to Ayrshire in Scotland. The lowest pressure of 949 mbar (28.0 inHg) was estimated near Edinburgh around 16:00. After hitting the United Kingdom, the storm tracked rapidly east towards Denmark causing major damage and a further 30 deaths in the Netherlands and Belgium.

=== Winds ===
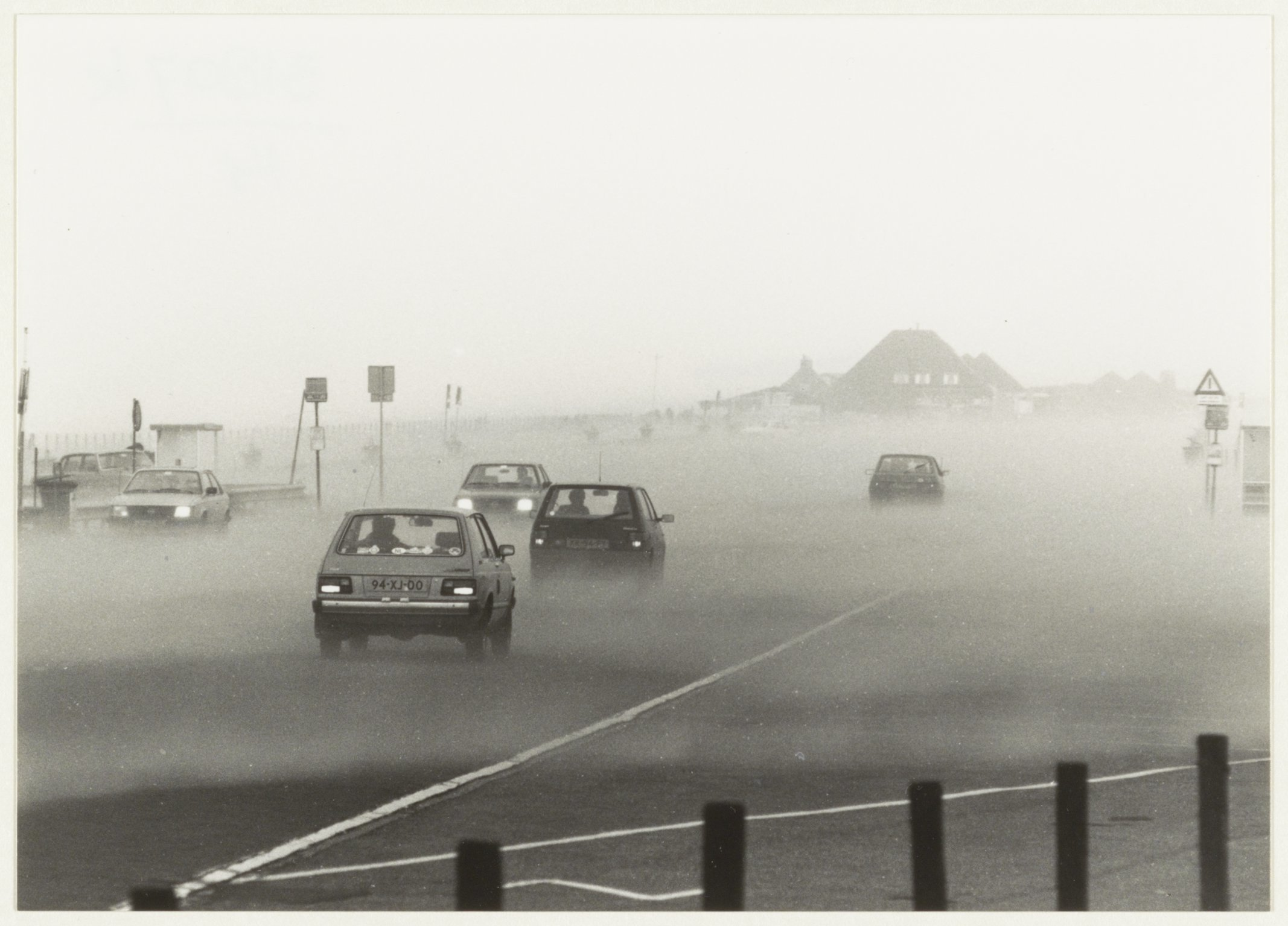
The wind in the coastal town of Bloemendaal, Netherlands

The strongest sustained winds recorded were between 70 and 75 mph (113 and 121 km/h), comparable to a weak Category 1 hurricane or Hurricane-force 12 on the Beaufort Scale. Strong gusts of up to 104 mph (167 km/h) were reported, which caused the most extensive damage. The Great Storm of 1987 contained considerably higher wind speeds across every parameter but affected a smaller area of the UK; both highest recorded sustained wind speeds of 86 mph and highest gust of 135 mph, for example. Sustained periods of high gust speeds were also far higher in 1987. However, during the 1987 storm, many anemometers stopped recording because of power outages, breakages by the excess wind speeds and measurement maxima being exceeded. By 1990, the meteorological community had newer devices that remained independent of external power and could measure higher wind speeds. The general opinion is that wind speeds measured during the Burns' Day Storm provide an accurate picture, but there is a tendency to downplay windspeeds from the 1987 storm because of the patchy data available. In the 1987 storm, it was the counties of Sussex, Surrey, Kent and Essex (i.e. the SE of England) which were worst hit and suffered the most damage. A Met Office forecaster the previous day, Michael Fish, notoriously said he had assured a lady enquirer that "there was not going to be a 'hurricane'".

=== Forecasting ===
The Burns' Day Storm of 1990 has been given as an example of when the Met Office "got the prediction right". The model forecast hinged on observations from two ships in the Atlantic near the developing storm the day before it reached the UK.

During the day of the storm, the Royal Netherlands Meteorological Institute (KNMI) increased warnings to force 11 and eventually to hurricane force 12. It conducted research that showed that most of the general public could not understand the severity of the warnings. The storm has led to more awareness and understanding of storminess among the public by the KNMI, which started a teletext page and the introduction of special warnings for extreme weather events in reaction to these findings.

== Impacts ==
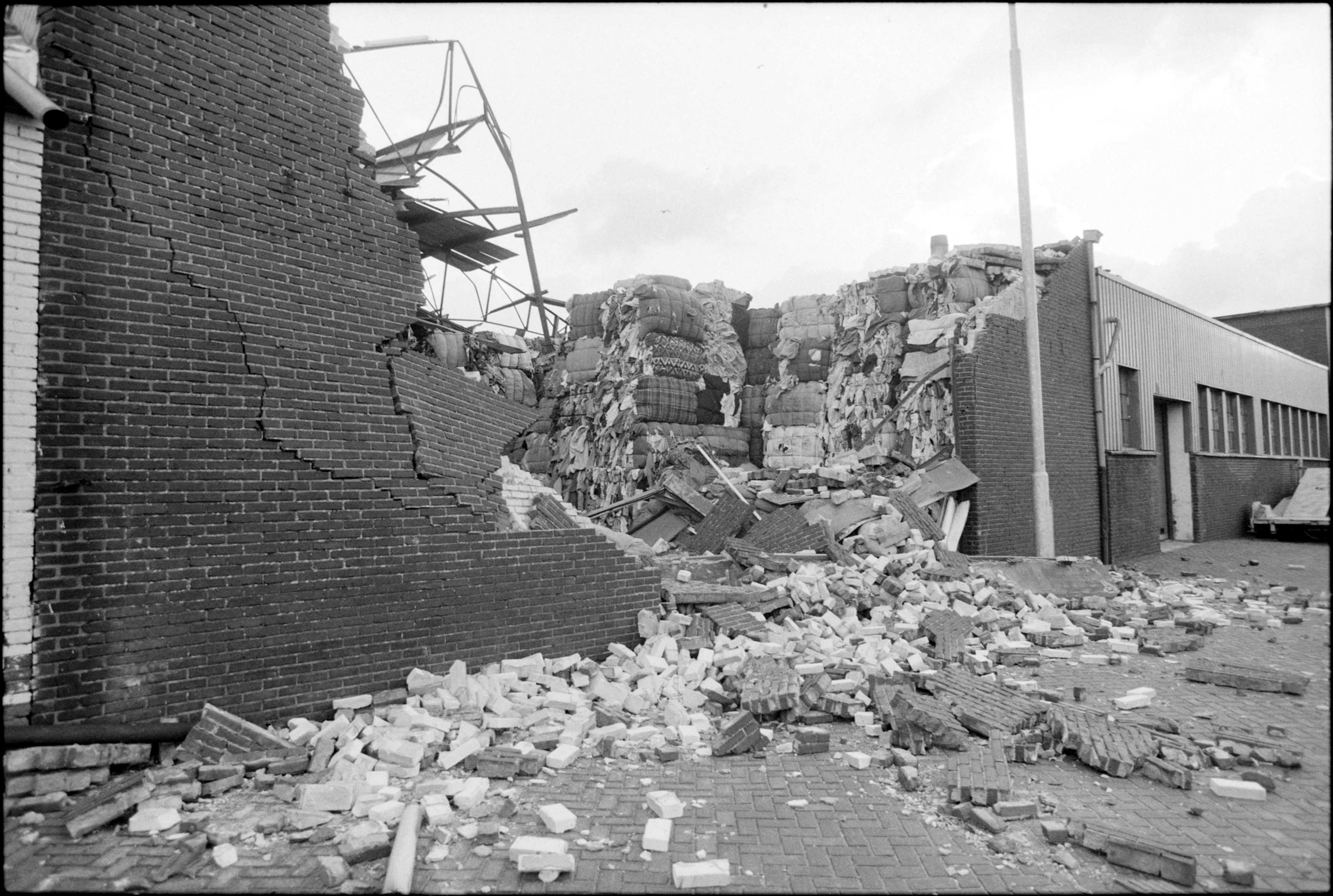
Destruction caused by the storm in IJmuiden, Netherlands

Casualties were much higher than those of the Great Storm of 1987 because the storm hit during the daytime. There were 47 deaths in the UK, most caused by collapsing buildings or falling debris. A schoolgirl was killed by a falling tree at Presdales School in Ware, Hertfordshire, and a class of children in Sussex was evacuated just minutes before their school building collapsed. The actor Gorden Kaye was injured during the storm when a plank of an advertising board was blown through his car's windscreen, and Kaye required emergency brain surgery to recover. The storm caused extensive damage, with approximately 3 million trees downed, power disrupted to over 500,000 homes and severe flooding in England and West Germany. The storm cost insurers in the UK £3.37 billion, the UK's most expensive weather event to insurers.

== Highest wind gust per country ==
Country	Highest Gust	Location
Ireland	168 km/h	Dunmore Head
United Kingdom	172 km/h	Aberporth & Gwennap Head
France	164 km/h	Sangatte
Belgium	168 km/h	Beauvechain
Luxembourg	162 km/h	Wincrange
Netherlands	159 km/h	IJmuiden & Westkapelle
Germany	230 km/h	Brocken
Denmark	166 km/h	Gedser Odde & Nykøbing Falster

== See also ==
- Vivian (storm) 25–28 February 1990, later Wiebke. This is called the 1990 storm series.
- List of natural disasters in Great Britain and Ireland
