= List of storms named Otto =

The name Otto was used for three tropical cyclones in the Atlantic Ocean and for one each in Europe, the Western Pacific Ocean and Australian region.

== In the Atlantic ==
- Tropical Storm Otto (2004), late-season storm that remained far from land
- Hurricane Otto (2010), brought heavy rain to the northeastern Caribbean before moving out into the Atlantic Ocean
- Hurricane Otto (2016), made landfall in Nicaragua as a Category 3 hurricane, bringing torrential rainfall to Central America; later emerged into the Eastern Pacific Ocean as a tropical storm and then dissipated.

The name Otto was retired from future use in the Atlantic after the 2016 season and was replaced with Owen for the 2022 season.

== In Europe ==
- Storm Otto (2023), part of the 2022–23 European windstorm season

== In the Western Pacific ==
- Typhoon Otto (1998) (T9802, 04W, Bising) - Latest first typhoon of a season on record.

== In the Australian region ==
- Cyclone Otto (1977), made landfall near Queensland in March 1977.
