= Cyclone Berit =

Very strong European windstorm in mid-November 2011

Cyclone Berit (Xaver)
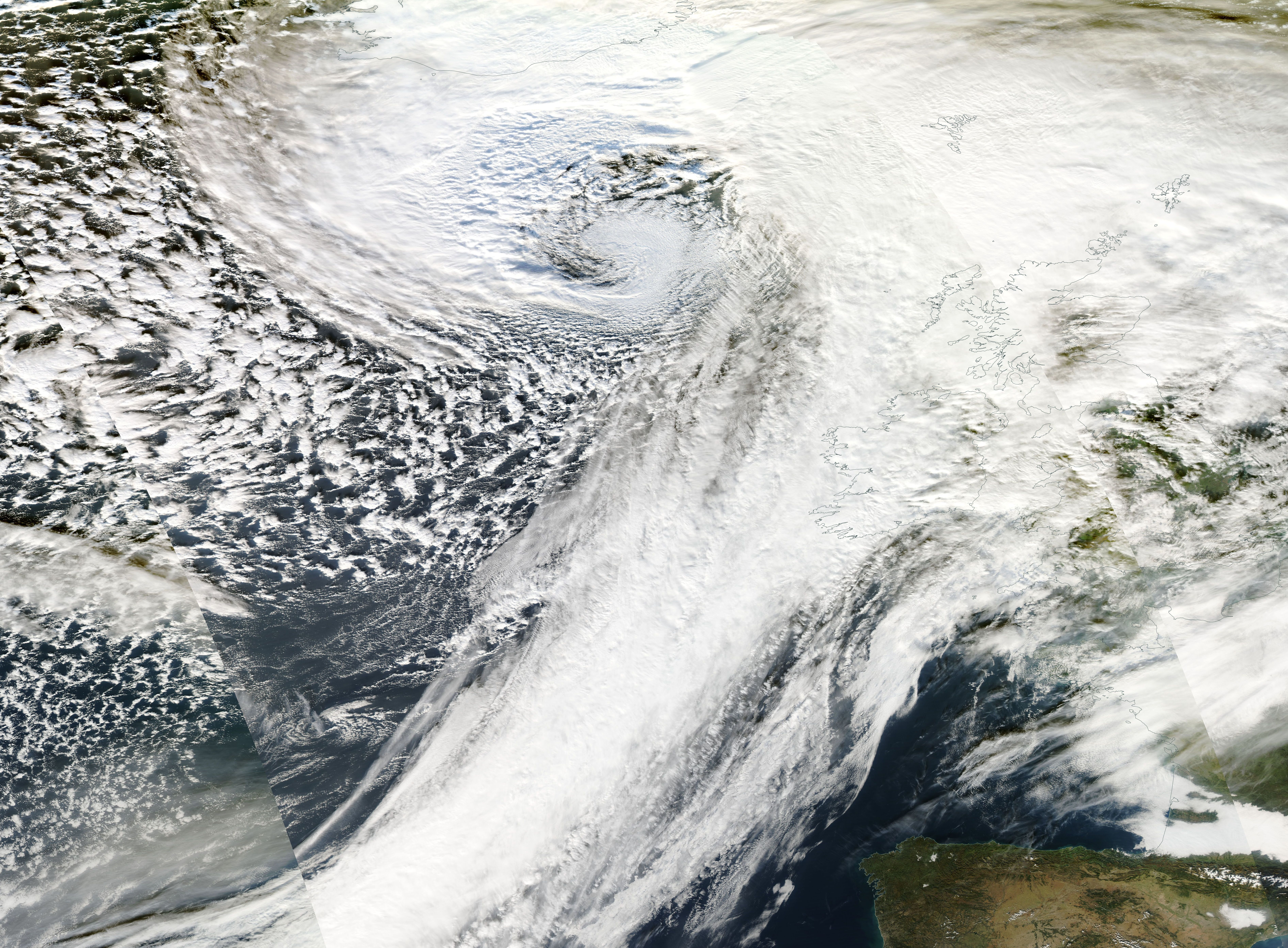
- Berit intensifying west of the United Kingdom on 24 November 2011

Meteorological history
- Formed: 22 November 2011
- Dissipated: 29 November 2011

European windstorm, Extratropical
- Lowest pressure: 944 mb (27.9 inHg)

Overall effects
- Fatalities: 4
- Missing: 2
- Areas affected: Scotland, Northern Ireland, Faroe Islands, Iceland, Norway, Sweden, and England Finland Estonia, Russia

Cyclone Berit (also named Cyclone Xaver by the Free University of Berlin) was a very strong European windstorm that formed as a tropical wave near the Lesser Antilles in mid-November 2011. The storm began producing heavy rain and snow over Northern Europe on 24 and 25 November. Scotland saw its first snowfall since March, earlier in the year. The Faroe Islands also reported winds up to 198 km/h (55 m/s; 123 mph) and excessive damage. On 25 November, the Norwegian Weather Service named the storm 'Berit'. Another storm, called Yoda, hit Scotland just a day after Xaver. The storm Yoda was widely known as Lille-Berit (Little-Berit) in Scandinavia, as the Norwegian Weather Service did not issue it with an official name.

== Meteorological history ==
A low pressure area formed south of the Azores on 21 November, and by the next day, was named Xaver by the Free University of Berlin. On 23 November, the storm passed north-east of the United Kingdom and to the south of the Faroe Islands with a strong central pressure of 980 millibars. Xaver rapidly strengthened during the early hours of 24 November, and had also developed an eye. During the late hours of 25 November, Xaver began weakening as it approached the coast of Norway. It continued to move towards the east-northeast for the next few days, and dissipated over Russia on 29 November.

== Impact ==
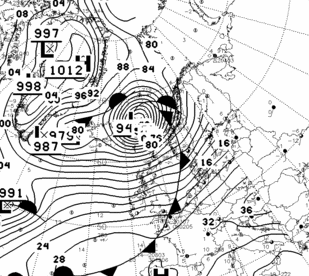
Cyclone Xaver (Berit)

Massive damages were experienced on the Faroe Islands as they were hit by windspeeds of 184 km/h (51 m/s; 114 mph). Police on the islands imposed a curfew. Boats and debris were blown about, with some concern that oil might have leaked from a boat dashed against the rocks. Residents of a nursing home in Trongisvágur were evacuated mid-storm as the roof was blown off.

The storm brought heavy snow over the mountains and large waves to the coastline of Scotland. The UK Met Office issued severe weather warnings for strong winds and heavy rain for the end of November. One woman died after her car got swept into a loch in Harris on 25 November. Twelve Caledonian MacBrayne ferries were cancelled from the Western Isles. Staff members had to move below 610 m (2,000 ft) on Ben Nevis as gale-force winds forced the gondola lifts to close. Schools were closed on 25 November due to high winds. The Forth, Skye, Tay, Erskine, Friarton and the Clackmannanshire Bridge had speed restrictions on 25 November.

A class II warning for Sweden was issued by SMHI, which means there is a danger to the public. On 26 November, Statoil was forced to close three platforms due to high waves. Waves were expected to reach 15 m (49 ft) along the Norwegian coastline. In Stapnes, Norway 3 members of the Skumringslandet film crew were swept out to sea as they filmed the crashing waves. One managed to get back to shore, however the others did not. In Bergen a man was also killed after being hit by a falling tree. A landslide was also initiated close to Myrdal, which resulted in disruption to the Oslo-Bergen train service. There was also severe disruption to ferry services between the Scandinavian countries with thousands of passengers stranded.

In England the Environment Agency issued warnings of a storm surge to affect the East Coast on 27 November. Whitby town centre was flooded with reports of flooding around the Tyne, Humber and Norfolk coast. The highest tide in 14 years of measurement was recorded in Hull, where the Hull tidal barrier was lowered to protect the city. The grey seal colony at Donna Nook in Lincolnshire was inundated during pupping season.

In Estonia 100 m^{3} (3,500 cu ft) of birch timber were swept off the Lithuanian ship MS Alfalina 22 km (14 mi) west of Saaremaa. Eesti Energia estimated that 6500 customers were without electricity countrywide in the wake of the storm, with even the Christmas tree in Tallinn being toppled by the strong wind.
