= Storm Malik =

European windstorm in 2022

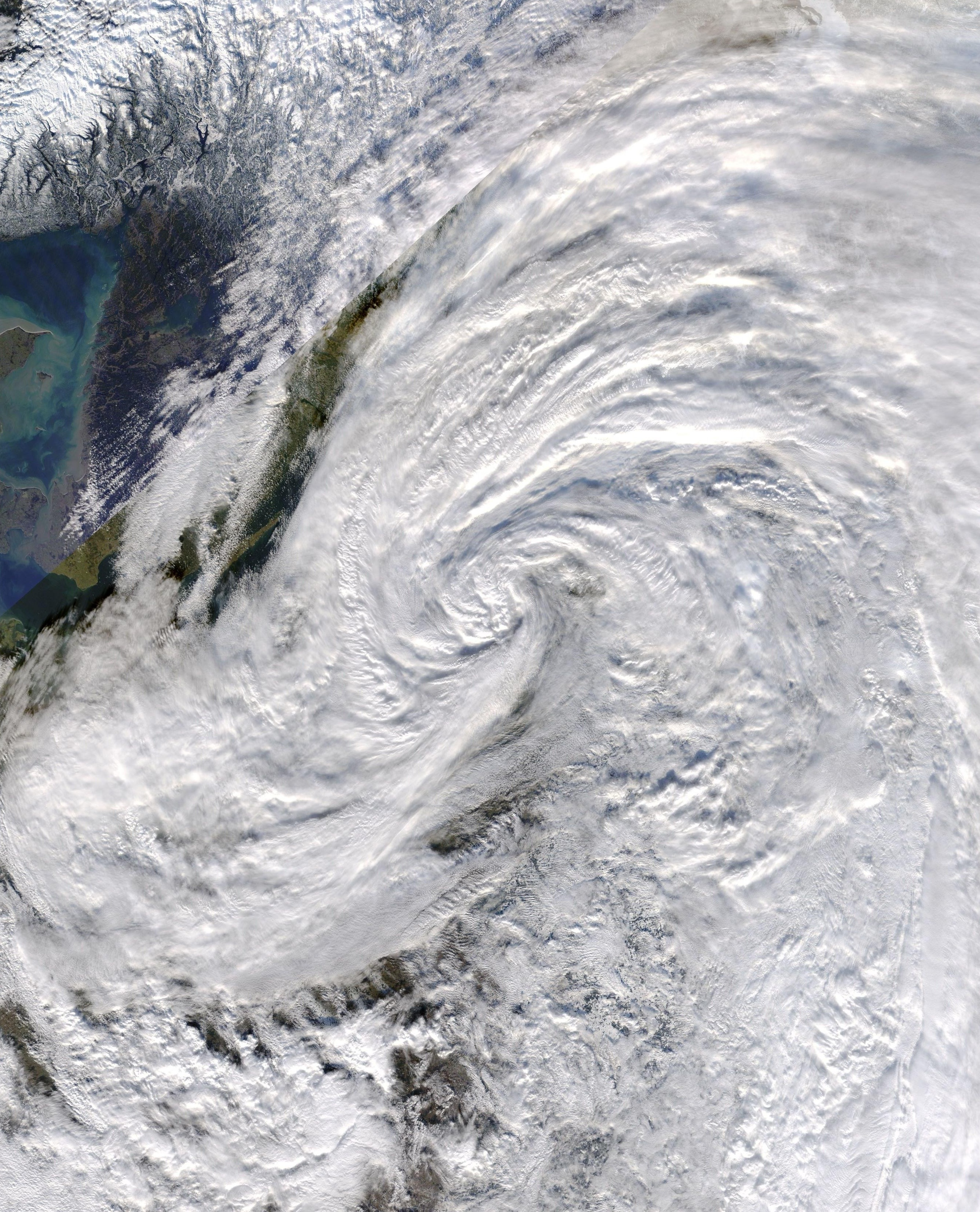
- Malik on 30 January

Meteorological history
- Formed: 28 January 2022
- Dissipated: 30 January 2022

Extratropical cyclone
- Highest gusts: 237 kilometres per hour (147 mph; 128 kn)
- Lowest pressure: 965 mb (965 hPa)

Overall effects
- Fatalities: 7
- Damage: $415 million (2022 USD), €382 million (2022 Euros)
- Areas affected: UK, Ireland, Denmark, Norway, Sweden, Finland, Lithuania, Latvia, Estonia, Germany, Poland, Czech Republic
- Power outages: 810,000
- Part of the 2021-22 European windstorm season

Storm Malik was an extratropical cyclone that caused damage throughout northern Europe. It was named by the Danish Meteorological Institute in Denmark on 28 January 2022, and lasted until 30 January 2022. It caused 2958 severe wind reports and over 800,000 power outages in multiple countries. Seven people were killed in the storm, and a total of $415 million (USD) in damages were reported.

== Meteorological history ==
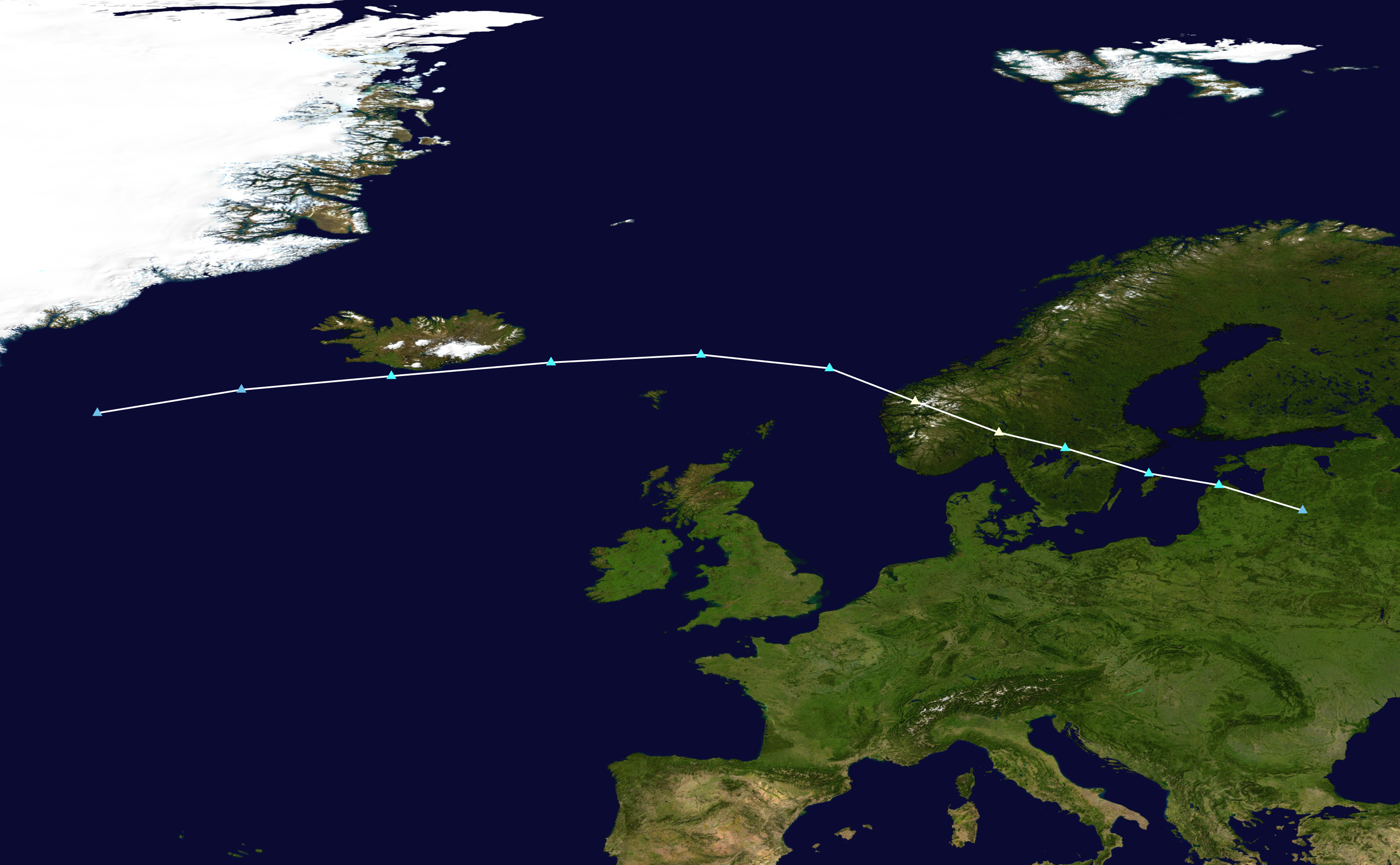
Map plotting the storm's track and intensity, according to the Saffir–Simpson scale Map key Saffir–Simpson scale Tropical depression (≤38 mph, ≤62 km/h) Tropical storm (39–73 mph, 63–118 km/h) Category 1 (74–95 mph, 119–153 km/h) Category 2 (96–110 mph, 154–177 km/h) Category 3 (111–129 mph, 178–208 km/h) Category 4 (130–156 mph, 209–251 km/h) Category 5 (≥157 mph, ≥252 km/h) Unknown Storm type Tropical cyclone Subtropical cyclone Extratropical cyclone, remnant low, tropical disturbance, or monsoon depression

On 28 January 2022, Storm Malik was named by the Danish Meteorological Institute, after the Greenlandic name that also means "wave". In Finland and Germany, which are not part of the storm naming groups, it was named Valtteri by the Finnish Meteorological Institute, while the Free University of Berlin named the same system as Nadia. The storm lasted until January 30, after which it dissipated.

== Impacts ==
The impact from the storm ranged from mild to severe throughout most of the continent. UK wind power generation peaked at 19.5 GW; a new record.

=== Fatalities ===
Two fatalities were reported in the United Kingdom due to Storm Malik: a 60-year-old woman in Aberdeen, Scotland and a 9-year-old boy in Staffordshire, England. Both were hit by falling trees. In Denmark, a 78-year-old woman died from injuries sustained when a door she opened was caught by the wind and she fell. In Germany, a person in Beelitz was killed when hit by a poster that had come loose and in Poland a person was killed when a tree fell on a moving car in Wejherowo County. In the Czech Republic, a worker died after being buried by a wall.

=== Injuries ===
Two teenagers were injured in the southern Swedish region of Scania when their car was hit by a falling tree. A child was injured when a tree crashed through the roof in Charlottenlund, Denmark, while west of Esbjerg, a moving car was hit by a large branch, resulting in three injuries. In Poland, a driver was injured when she drove into a downed tree near Kierzkowo, while in Tłuczewo, a person sustained arm injuries. In Germany, a man was injured by a falling tree in a park, in Bremen.

=== Damage ===
More than 680,000 people were left without power in Poland by the storm and in the United Kingdom around 130,000 lost power. In Sweden around 40,000 households lost power, mostly in the south.

==== Sweden ====
In the city of Malmö, many facade panels from the Turning Torso building fell. In the Västra Hamnen (The West Harbour) area a crane from a construction site got overturned and landed close to a bus stop full of people. A second crane got overturned in the city of Malmö and landed on parked cars. Another crane got overturned in the city of Södertälje south of Stockholm and landed on a hospital, but only caused slight damage to windows in the ICU section. Many trees fell throughout southern Sweden. Many trees also fell in the town of Norrtälje.

==== Lithuania ====
The storm caused damage to the Lithuanian coast as well, with local authorities calling it the "worst storm since Cyclone Anatol in 1999". The storm reached winds of 93 kilometres per hour (58 mph; 50 kn) with gusts of 125 kilometres per hour (78 mph; 67 kn). Infrastructure and protective dunes along the Curonian Spit were considerably damaged by the storm.

==== Denmark ====
20 elderly residents in Frederikssund were evacuated due to the threat of storm surges on the day of the event as a respond to the forecast of at most 1.9 meters (6.2 feet) of storm surge. The storm caused widespread wind damage, with several homes sustaining roof damage or having their roofs partly torn off, including the roof of a small football stadium. Several train routes were cancelled because of trees damaging powerlines. More than 2400 reports of storm damage were reported to the authorities. Highest wind gust measured was 40 meters per second, becoming the strongest windstorm to make landfall in Denmark since 2016. Severe storm surge occurred in southern Denmark, with Wadden Sea National Park recording 3.5 meters (11 feet) high storm surge.

== Aftermath ==
The damage in the United Kingdom and Ireland by Malik was worsened by Storm Corrie, which started affecting the two countries on 29 January. The following storm resulted in 118,000 power outages in Scotland, and more overall damage.

The storm's wind generated 19.5 GW in UK, the highest it's been, as of 2022.

== Highest wind gust per country ==
Country	Gust	Location
United Kingdom	237 km/h	Cairngorms
Ireland	164 km/h	Rosslare Harbour
Denmark	155 km/h	Hvide Sande
Norway	176 km/h	Skudeneshavn
Sweden	153 km/h	Visby
Finland	145 km/h	Turku
Estonia	139 km/h	Haapsalu
Latvia	136 km/h	Kolkasrags
Lithuania	132 km/h	Alytus
Poland	146 km/h	Władysławowo
Germany	137 km/h	Großer Arber
Czechia	124 km/h	Mariánské Lázne
France	128 km/h	Blonville-sur-Mer
Belgium	96 km/h	Middelkerke
Netherlands	90 km/h	Lauwersoog

== See also ==
- Weather of 2022
- 2021–22 European windstorm season
- Cyclone Anatol
- Beaufort scale
- Saffir–Simpson scale
