= Storm Vivian =

1990 European windstorm

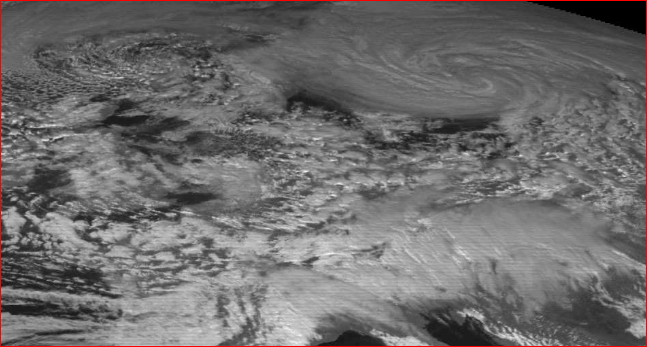
- Low Vivian approaching Finland 27 February 1990

Meteorological history
- Formed: 25 February 1990
- Dissipated: 28 February 1990

European windstorm, Extratropical cyclone
- Highest winds: 120–160 km/h (75–99 mph)
- Highest gusts: 268 km/h (167 mph)
- Lowest pressure: 940.3 hPa (27.77 inHg)

Overall effects
- Fatalities: 64
- Damage: c. 1.11B €; 1.5 B euros of insured damage in Germany
- Areas affected: Belgium, France, Germany, the Netherlands, Finland and the United Kingdom

Vivian was one of a series of severe European windstorms in 1990. It struck large parts of Europe from 25 to 27 February 1990 and cost 64 people their lives. A few days later it was followed by windstorm Wiebke. After Hurricane Andrew in 1992 (26.5 B USD), Cyclone Daria (known as Burns' Day Storm in the UK) in January 1990 and Windstorm Lothar in 1999 (each costing c. B USD), and the Great Storm of 1987 (4.3 B USD) Vivian/Wiebke was one of the most expensive Atlantic storms in history, costing 4 B USD of insurance payments. In his report Winter storms in Europe - History from 1703 to 2012 (Winterstürme in Europa - Historie von 1703 bis 2012), Aon Benfield assessed the cost of insurance payouts for storm damage in Germany as 1.5 billion euros.

== Area ==
Apart from Germany (15 deaths), other countries affected badly were the United Kingdom, Ireland, France, the Netherlands, Belgium and Switzerland.

In Hamburg there were several successive storm surges. Thanks to the storms, the Rosenmontag parade in Düsseldorf was postponed until May, whilst in Cologne it went ahead with high safety precautions.

Death toll: The fatalities are given as 64 persons, the damage is estimated as ca. 1.11 billion €.

== Wiebke (storm) ==
- From 28 February to 1 March 1990
- In central Europe (Germany, Austria, Switzerland)
- Death toll: 35 persons
- German version: Wiebke (storm)

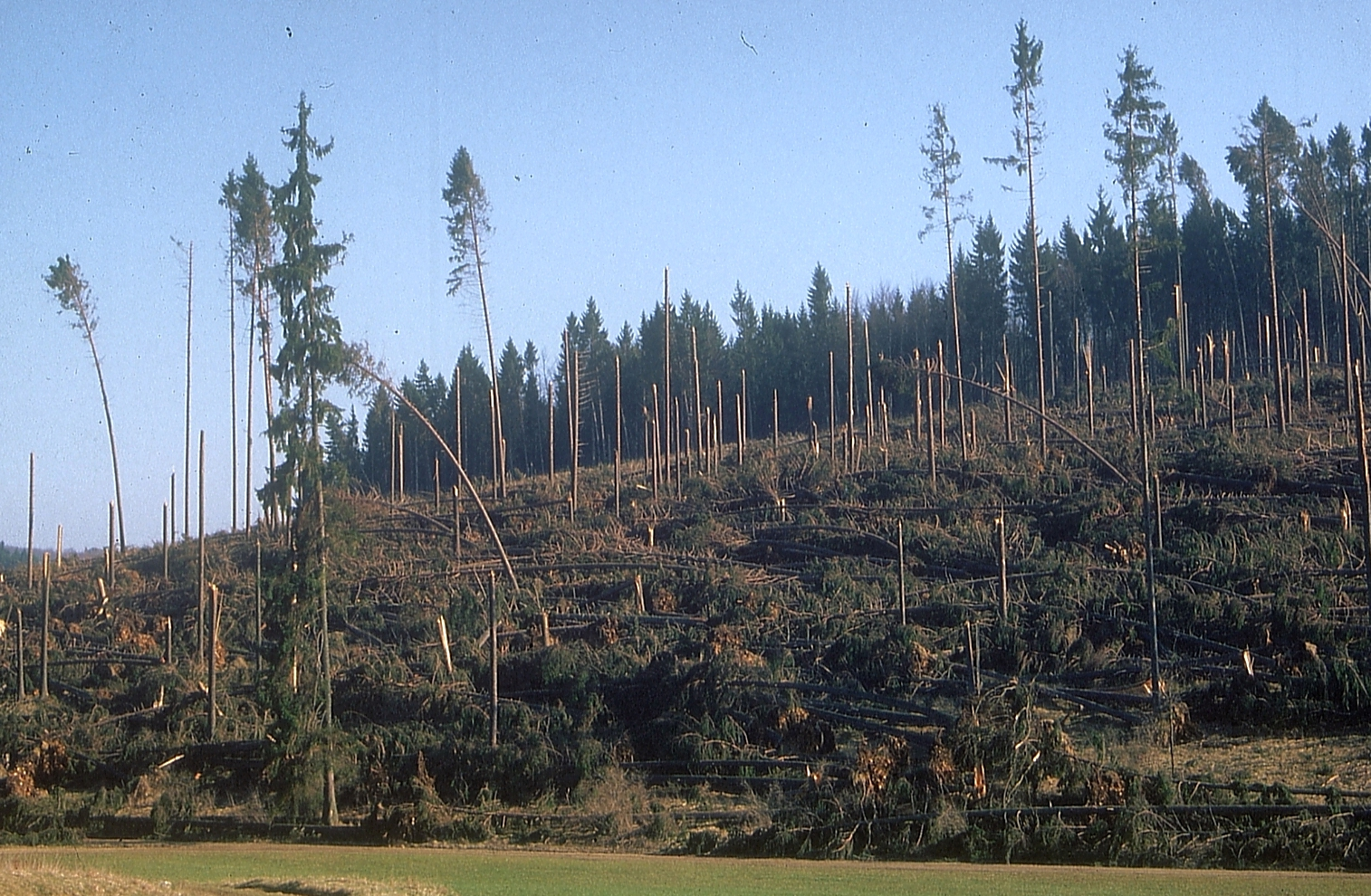
Windthrow in a German forest

Particularly in mountain regions, a large number of trees were damaged. (Even complete spruce and beech stands/forests). Hundreds of trees were bent or thrown like matches. Extrapolations go of 60 to 70 million cubic meters of extra "cut" wood by the storm, which corresponded to about twice the annual harvesting in Germany.
