= Late December 1999 European storms =

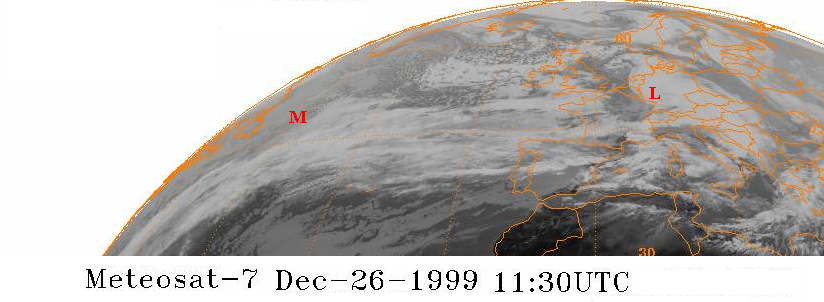
- Infrared satellite image showing the position of storms Lothar (L over Germany) and Martin (M in the Atlantic) at 11:30 UTC on December 26, 1999 (Meteosat).

Meteorological history
- Formed: December 25, 1999
- Dissipated: December 28, 1999

European windstorm

Overall effects
- Fatalities: 140
- Areas affected: Western Europe

The late December 1999 European storms were two intense and rapidly developing mid-latitude low-pressure systems, named Lothar and Martin, which affected Western Europe between 26 and 28 December 1999. Classified as explosive extratropical cyclones, they caused widespread wind damage, resulting in 140 fatalities and an estimated US$19.2 billion (2006 value) in material losses.

== Confusion of terms ==
Although sometimes referred to as hurricanes in media coverage, these storms did not exhibit the structural characteristics of tropical cyclones. Tropical cyclones cannot form over waters cooler than 26 °C, and the final hurricane of the 1999 Atlantic season occurred in November in the Antilles, according to the National Hurricane Center, the World Meteorological Organization’s designated regional center for the North Atlantic. The use of the term “hurricane” was therefore metaphorical and based solely on wind strength as defined by the Beaufort scale.

== Meteorological situation ==
In December 1999, Europe was affected by three major low-pressure systems. On 3 December, Storm Anatol caused severe damage in Denmark and northern Germany. Later that month, two further storms occurred less than two days apart and were widely described by the media as the “storm of the century” in Europe. The first, Lothar, was a compact and fast-moving depression that did not disrupt the prevailing zonal atmospheric circulation, allowing a second storm, Martin, to follow closely. Martin, which had a larger spatial extent, was associated with a change in atmospheric circulation that prevented subsequent depressions from developing in its wake. These storms shared two common characteristics:

- a long baroclinic zone between North America and Europe serving as a highway for their trajectory;
- the existence of a very warm air mass (high equivalent potential temperature) south of the baroclinic zone, allowing a strong temperature contrast and serving as the engine of cyclogenesis.

=== Storm Lothar ===
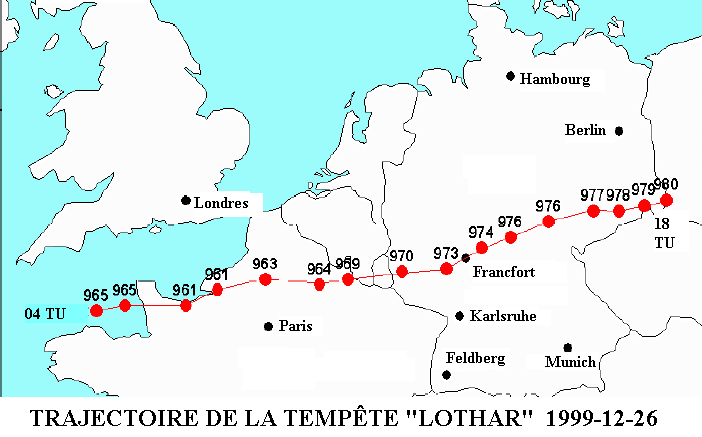
Map showing the path of Storm Lothar on December 26, 1999, with atmospheric pressure readings taken at hourly intervals.

Lothar was the name given to the storm that rapidly crossed northern France on the morning of 26 December 1999. Moving from west to east along a trajectory close to the 49th parallel, the depression reached Finistère around 2 a.m. and Strasbourg by late morning, corresponding to an average speed of about 100 km/h. The strongest winds affected a corridor approximately 150 km wide, extending from western Brittany through Normandy, Île-de-France, Champagne-Ardenne, Lorraine, and Alsace.

After crossing France, Lothar continued into Germany, where it caused extensive damage to infrastructure and forested areas, including the Black Forest. The storm resulted in severe and unprecedented forest damage across France, Switzerland, Germany, and Denmark, with wind gusts in mountainous areas reaching up to 259 km/h.

The depression formed off the coast of Newfoundland and crossed the Atlantic Ocean in less than twenty-four hours. Unusually for Europe, this “bomb” cyclone intensified over land, reaching a minimum atmospheric pressure of about 960 hPa, likely due to strong interactions with the jet stream, where wind speeds approached 400 km/h at an altitude of around 9,000 m. According to a later study by the Zentralanstalt für Meteorologie und Geodynamik (ZAMG), the Austrian meteorological service, Lothar was followed by a secondary cyclogenetic trough that moved across Belgium and southwestern Germany, producing winds exceeding 90 km/h.

=== Storm Martin ===
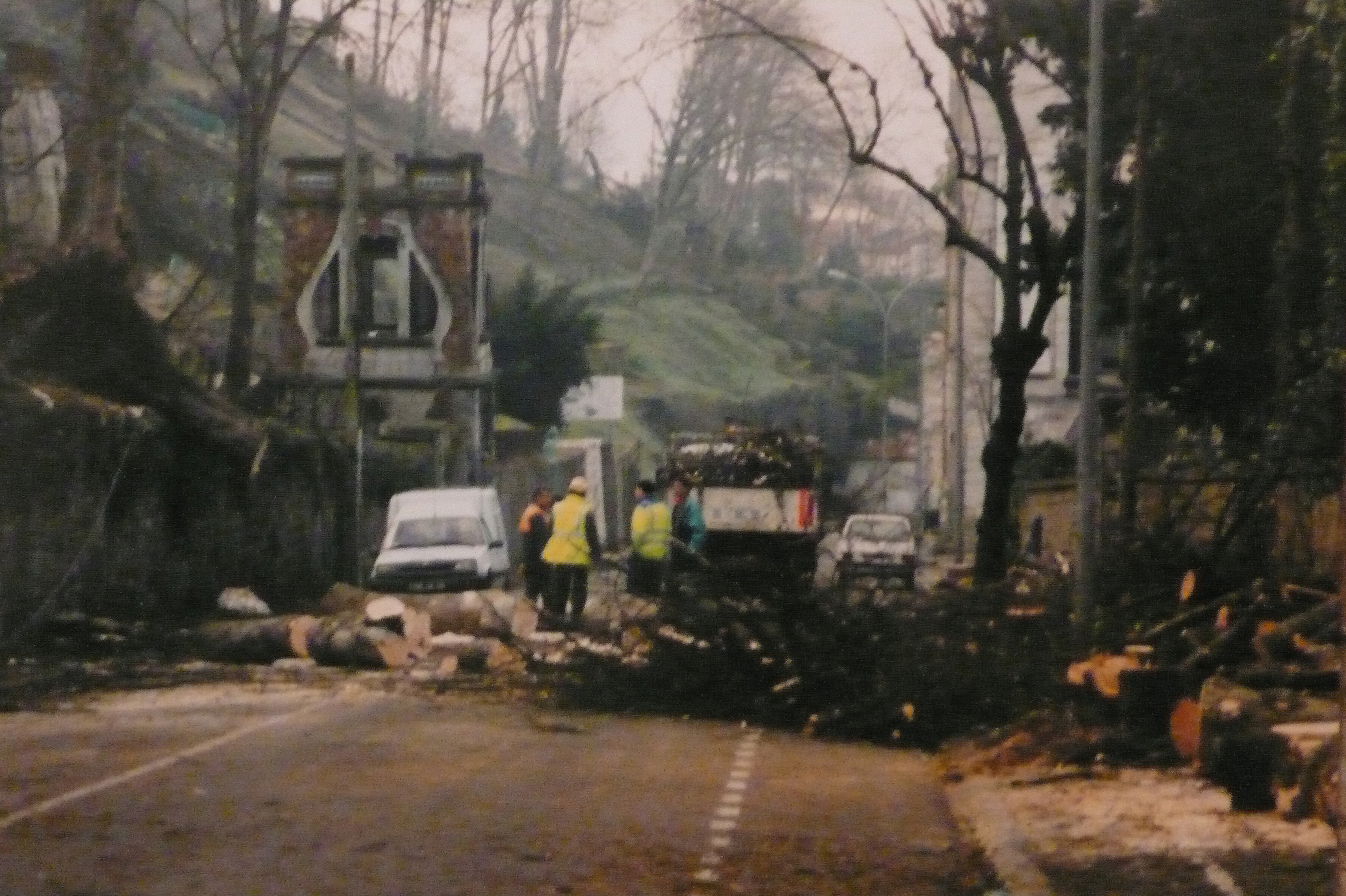
Clearing work on a street in Angoulême on December 28, 1999.

The second deep depression, reaching a minimum pressure of 965 hPa in Brittany, crossed France at an average speed of around 100 km/h from the afternoon of 27 December 1999 into the following night. It formed off the coast of Brittany, reaching the region around 4 p.m., then progressed toward Nantes, Romorantin, Dijon, and Alsace. The strongest winds affected Brittany, the Atlantic coast—including Charente-Maritime and Charente, where gusts of 198 km/h were recorded on the Île d’Oléron—and areas south of a La Rochelle–Mâcon line, with gusts of up to 160 km/h reported in Cannes. The storm continued to affect Corsica on the morning of 28 December, generating strong coastal waves, and also impacted Spain, western Switzerland, and northern Italy.

North of the depression, a surge of cold air from the afternoon of 27 December 1999 produced snowfall in northern Brittany and Normandy. Overnight, snow spread to northeastern France, reaching the Geneva region and leaving some flakes south of Paris. Concurrently, heavy rainfall caused localized flooding along the storm’s path. In parts of the Alps, snowfall continued for two days, accumulating to approximately two meters.

== Measured gusts ==
According to Météo-France, the following gusts were recorded, among others
Date	Location	Speed (km/h)	Date	Location	Speed (km/h)
December 26	Orly	173	December 27-28	Mandelieu-la-Napoule	205
December 26	Saint-Brieuc	173	December 27-28	Île d'Oléron	198
December 26	Paris (Parc Montsouris)	169	December 27-28	Royan	194
December 26	Alençon	166	December 27-28	Cap Ferret	173
December 26	Colmar	165	December 27-28	Biscarrosse	166
December 26	Île de Groix	162	December 27-28	Millau	166
December 26	Cap de la Hague	162	December 27-28	Île d'Yeu	162
December 26	Dinard	158	December 27-28	Pointe du Raz	162
December 26	Saint-Dizier	158	December 27-28	Clermont-Ferrand	159
December 26	Metz	155	December 27-28	La Rochelle	158
December 26	Caen	151	December 27-28	Bastia	155
December 26	Reims	151	December 27-28	Cognac	151
December 26	Orléans	151	December 27-28	Limoges	148
December 26	Troyes	148	December 27-28	Bordeaux	144
December 26	Ploumanac'h	148	December 27-28	Bergerac	140
December 26	Nancy	144	December 27-28	Carcassonne	140
December 26	Chartres	144	December 27-28	Perpignan	140
December 26	Strasbourg	144	December 27-28	Pau	140
December 26	Rouen	140	December 27-28	Toulouse	137
December 26	Évreux	140	December 27-28	Aurillac	137
December 26	Rennes	126	December 27-28	Tarbes	137
December 26	Nantes	126	December 27-28	Saint-Girons	137
December 26	Dijon	126	December 27-28	Dax	133
December 26			December 27-28	Mâcon	126

Unverified observations
Date	Location	Speed	Comment
December 26	Paris (Eiffel Tower) according to France3	216 km/h	Anemometer stuck at its maximum; actual wind speed probably higher, but not representative of surface wind

== Weather forecasting and population warnings ==
=== France ===
==== Storm Lothar ====
Following the 1987 storm, European meteorological services improved their numerical weather prediction models. In 1999, Météo-France successfully forecast both storms. Using these models and data on exceptional temperature and pressure variations, the agency issued a bulletin warning of strong winds 24 hours before Storm Lothar.

Forecasters at Météo-France coordinate closely with Civil Protection services. On 26 December at 5:25 a.m., the Interministerial Operational Crisis Management Center (COGIC) of the Directorate of Civil Defense and Security (DDSC) was informed by Météo-France of approaching strong winds affecting Île-de-France and the eastern, northern, and central regions of France. This warning was confirmed at 6:45 a.m. with the issuance of a Meteorological Alarm Bulletin (BAM), indicating average winds of 80 km/h and gusts of 120 km/h, locally reaching 140 km/h.

Although the population had been warned of an exceptional meteorological event, the intensity of the gusts exceeded forecasts. At 7:30 a.m., Météo-France issued a supplement to the BAM, indicating that the windy episode could last from one to two hours in the Île-de-France region and central France, with winds potentially reaching 140 km/h and locally even 160 km/h. At 8:15 a.m., at the request of Météo-France, Civil Protection prepared a press release to inform residents of the affected areas about the significant risks associated with the forecasted winds. The alert, initially relayed by national news bulletins of the Radio France group, coincided with Storm Lothar already striking Normandy. The short interval between the alert issued by Météo-France and the onset of the storm limited the ability of the population to be informed in advance of the storm’s severity. Furthermore, the alert occurred late at night, immediately following the Christmas holidays, a period during which media attention is reduced and public mobilization is more challenging.

==== Storm Martin ====
Météo-France monitored low-pressure systems and issued warnings for Storm Martin on the morning of 27 December, forecasting wind gusts of up to 130 km/h inland and 150 km/h along the coasts and in mountainous areas. An alert bulletin was also issued for snowfall in Brittany. As with Storm Lothar, the population was insufficiently prepared due to limitations in the alert chain and an underestimation of wind intensity. Public and official awareness of the storm’s severity increased from 7:50 p.m., when reports of major damage, including the collapse of the glass roof at La Rochelle railway station, were broadcast in the regular France Info news bulletins.

=== Switzerland and Germany ===
MeteoSwiss encountered difficulties with its forecasting system, as its numerical weather prediction models initially indicated weak Atlantic depressions. Alerts were issued only on the morning of 26 December following an adjustment of these models. Some local emergency services were not fully aware of the storms’ severity and did not implement precautionary measures, partly due to the Christmas holiday period.

The Deutscher Wetterdienst (German Weather Service) was criticized for not issuing an alert for Storm Lothar. A post-event analysis noted that a computer problem in its communication system contributed to the delay.

== Victims and material damage ==
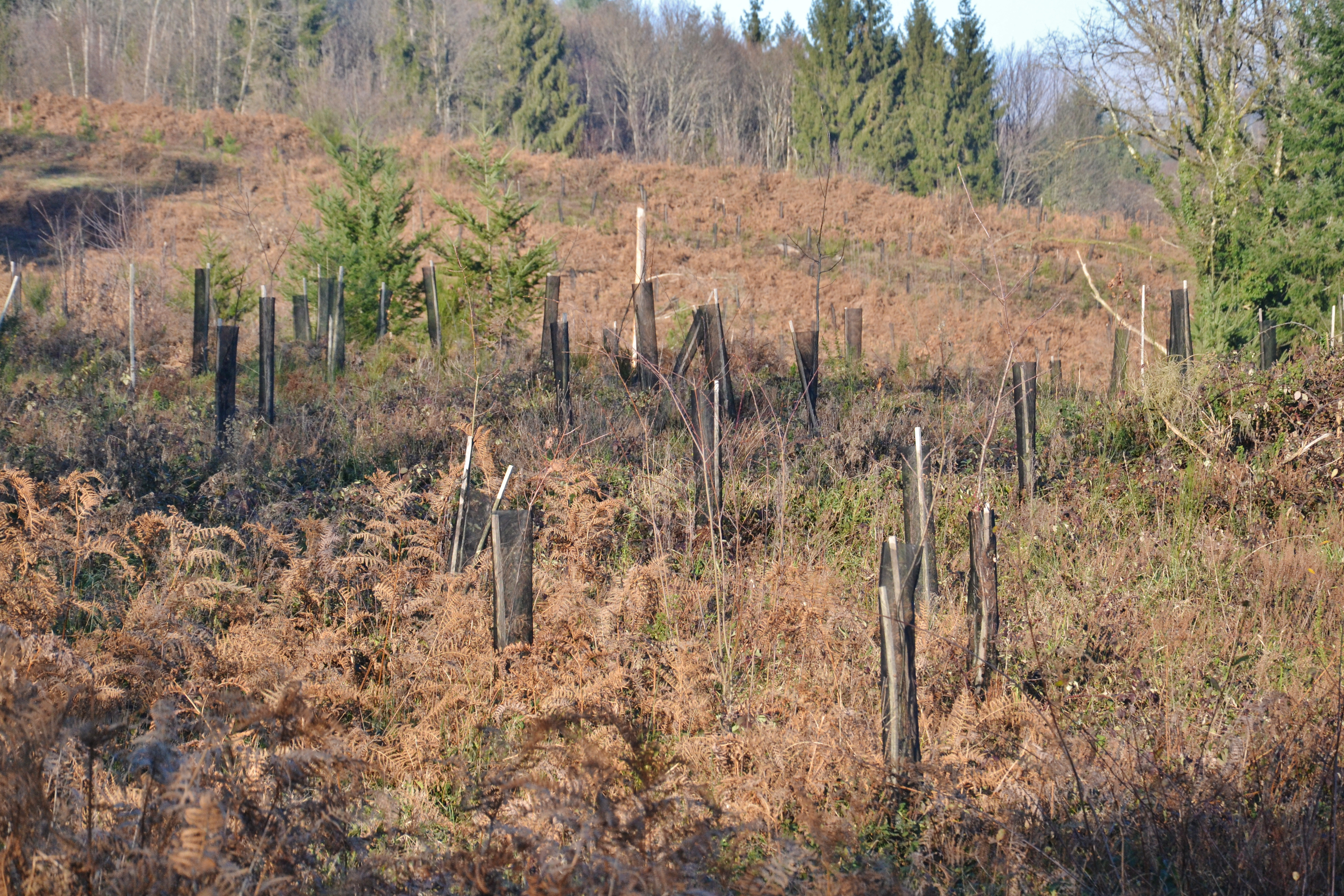
Plantations in a devastated forest in the Monts de Blond in Haute-Vienne (2011).

=== In France ===
In France, the two storms caused 92 deaths and approximately 2,000 injuries. Transport and distribution infrastructures sustained significant damage, and the storms had substantial impacts on forestry, agriculture, and some commercial sectors.

==== Infrastructure ====
Nearly 540 high-voltage and very high-voltage power lines and over a thousand pylons were damaged, representing approximately 8% of France’s electricity transmission network. Power outages affected around 3.6 million households, or about 10 million people, with some departments experiencing extensive disruptions (Orne, Creuse, Corrèze, Haute-Vienne, Cantal, Lot-et-Garonne) and others nearly complete blackouts (Vosges, Charente-Maritime). Water distribution was also disrupted, requiring 2.5 million people to obtain drinking water from commercial sources. Restoration efforts were supported by assistance from approximately twenty countries, (Note: Including Germany, Andorra, Austria, Belgium, Canada, Croatia, Denmark, Spain, Finland, Hungary, Ireland, Italy, Morocco, the Netherlands, Portugal, the Czech Republic, the United Kingdom, Switzerland, and Tunisia.) providing 1,500 technicians and specialized equipment.

On 27 December, a large portion of the road network was rendered impassable, including major routes such as the A10 autoroute and National Road 10. Approximately 20,000 km of roads and forest tracks providing access to wooded areas were damaged. Of the 32,000 km of railway lines, 20,000 km were disrupted. The mobilization of 18,000 railway workers allowed for the restoration of 95% of the network by 31 December, with rail traffic returning to normal after one week. Restoration and operational costs for the SNCF totaled 510 million francs. Several flights were cancelled, and some airports, including Bordeaux–Mérignac and Clermont-Ferrand, were temporarily closed.

Nearly one million subscribers lost landline telephone service due to fallen trees on overhead lines and the rapid depletion of backup batteries at exchanges and relay antennas. Approximately 3,500 mobile phone relay antennas operated by Itinéris, SFR, and Bouygues Télécom were also out of service. The restoration of the telephone networks cost around 1 billion francs for France Télécom, 100 million francs for SFR, and nearly 20 million francs for Bouygues Télécom. The reconstruction of the France Télécom network was completed in April 2001.

==== Agriculture ====
Forestry and agricultural damage was extensive, particularly in the timber sector. Hundreds of thousands of trees were felled, with waterlogged soils contributing to their instability. An initial assessment by the Regional Forest and Timber Services estimated the volume of uprooted and broken wood at 140 million cubic meters, with a margin of error of 30 percent. The most affected regions were Lorraine (29.5 million cubic meters), Aquitaine (27.7 million), and Limousin (16.3 million). Tree resistance varied by species and location, with poplars along the Garonne and oaks of the Adour showing greater resilience than pines in the Médoc and Douglas firs in Limousin, while mountainous areas were less affected than plains. A subsequent, more detailed assessment raised the estimated volume of felled trees to 176 million cubic meters. The extent of the damage, partially attributed to forestry practices, prompted a reevaluation of management approaches.

While viticulture was relatively unaffected, market gardening and horticulture suffered extensive damage, with thousands of hectares of greenhouses destroyed. Hundreds of thousands of fruit trees were felled or damaged in southwestern France, including plum trees in Lot-et-Garonne and walnut trees in Périgord, with orchard restoration taking around fifteen years. The livestock sector experienced significant losses, including drowned animals, damaged or destroyed buildings, and flooded fodder and silage. Power outages disrupted milking, refrigeration, and artificial incubation, resulting in the loss of milk and perishable food products. Food businesses reliant on cold storage, such as supermarkets, restaurants, bakeries, and caterers, lost substantial inventory. Transport and supply chains were disrupted, and some operations implemented short-time working measures. Along the Atlantic coast, storm surges reached 40–60 cm, and up to 1.5–2 m in Charente-Maritime, with approximately one quarter of oyster-farming installations in the Marennes–Oléron basin destroyed.

Certain sectors experienced increased activity as a result of reconstruction efforts, including construction, public works, manufacturers of building materials, and suppliers of do-it-yourself equipment.

==== Financial coverage ====
The financial impact of the 1999 storms on insurers in France was substantially higher than that of the 1990 storms, which had caused 8.6 billion francs in damages. The French reinsurance group Scor estimated total losses at nearly 33 billion francs, while in 2000, the French Federation of Insurance Companies (FFSA) estimated the damage at 44.3 billion francs (approximately 6.75 billion euros), excluding deductibles, undeclared losses, operating disruptions, and partial destruction of forest resources. Compensation in France amounted to 7.5 billion euros under storm coverage and 275 million euros for flooding. About half of these payments were financed by reinsurers, with the remainder covered by insurance company reserves and the Central Reinsurance Fund (CCR). The storms prompted insurers to define stricter loss criteria, while reinsurance companies, including Munich Re and Swiss Re, increased rates by 5 to 30%. In response to a decline in CCR reserves, public authorities revised the natural disaster surcharge, deductibles, and reinsurance conditions.

The financial cost to the French State for the restoration of forest resources following the 1999 storms included 2 billion francs in emergency aid in 2000, 12 billion francs in subsidized loans at 1.5%, 6 billion francs in reforestation subsidies over ten years, and 2 billion francs through “storm” amendments to State–region planning contracts.

=== In Europe ===
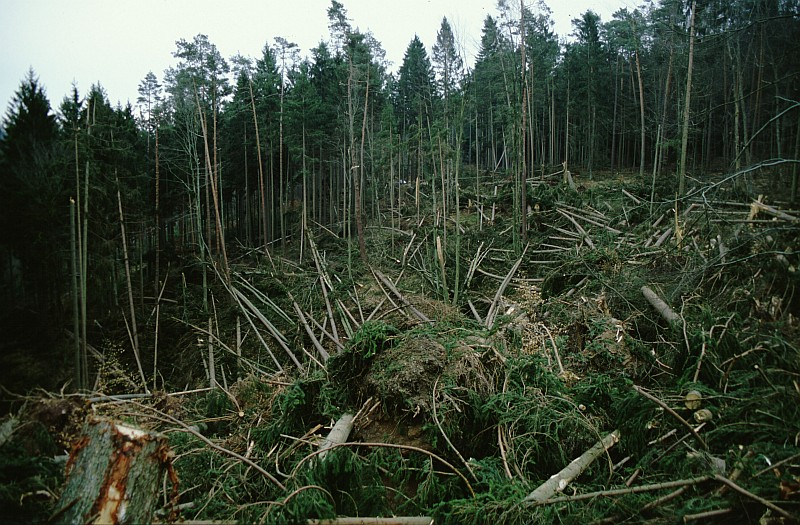
Chablis after Storm Lothar in a forest in Arenbachtal (Baden-Württemberg).

According to insurers and the authorities of the various countries:

- 140 deaths, including:
  - 110 due to Lothar and 30 due to Martin;
  - 17 deaths in Germany, 12 in Switzerland (including 2 when a cable car cabin fell because of a tree overturned by the winds of Storm Lothar), 8 in Great Britain, 3 in Italy, and 2 in Spain.

Coastal regions such as the island of Oléron were particularly devastated. Numerous historical monuments were also affected, such as the Valmy mill.

- In Switzerland, 13 million cubic meters of timber were felled.
- Economic losses amounted to 19.2 billion US dollars (2006 values):
  - 12.8 billion for Lothar;
  - 6.4 billion for Martin.
- Of these losses, 14.2 billion euros (2006 values) were compensated by insurers.

== Response of emergency and intervention services ==
=== In France ===
Initial emergency responses were conducted by CODIS, as well as operational units of the National Gendarmerie and public security, which were on permanent standby. Coordination of rescue operations was managed at the departmental level by prefects through crisis command posts, with varying degrees of effectiveness. At the regional level, emergency services were intended to be coordinated through interregional civil protection centers; however, several affected areas, including the Central-West and Central-East zones, did not have such centers in place.

At the national level, the French government activated the Decision Support Operations Center of the Ministry of the Interior and the Joint Armed Forces Operations Center under the authority of the Chief of the Defense Staff. The Decision Support Operations Center coordinated the deployment of reinforcement columns of firefighters from unaffected areas and the assembly of Civil Protection military units engaged in other operations. Initial army interventions were carried out rapidly through the spontaneous deployment of units by regimental or base commanders, primarily to secure people and clear key roads. Within 48 hours, the Joint Armed Forces Operations Center assumed overall coordination of military operations in consultation with the military defense districts.

Local initiatives were also implemented to address delays in emergency services in some isolated areas. These included the establishment of basic-necessities centers at the cantonal level (Doubs, Charente-Maritime), visits by postal workers to residents without other means of contact (Creuse), and a system for exchanging portable generators (Cantal).

== Consequences ==
In October 2001, Météo-France introduced a system of vigilance maps on its website and on television to provide warnings for affected departments. This system has since been adopted by several national meteorological services across Europe.

Following the 1999 storms, a safety plan was implemented in French educational institutions in 2002 to prepare staff and students for emergency situations.

In 2000, Électricité de France (EDF), then responsible for the electricity distribution network, established a Rapid Electricity Intervention Force composed of 2,500 volunteer technicians, organized into 16 regional teams. The teams were equipped to restore electricity in affected areas using heavy logistical resources, including generator sets and helicopters.

By early 2007, most areas affected by fallen trees had been cleared, although some locations remained untreated.

== See also ==
- Climate of Europe

== Bibliography ==
- Desbois, Michel; Pouradier, Gérard (2000). La France blessée : autopsie d'une catastrophe climatique [France wounded: autopsy of a climate disaster] (in French). Ramsay.
- Dedieu, François (2013). Une catastrophe ordinaire. La tempête du 27 décembre 1999 [An ordinary disaster. The storm of December 27, 1999] (in French). Éditions de l'École des hautes études en sciences sociales.
- Luciani, François-Xavier (2018). Subjonctif [Subjunctive] (in French). St Ouen: Les Éditions du Net. ISBN 978-2-312-06308-9.
  - Subjonctif is a noir novel set during the turn of the millennium in and around the village of Verzy. It depicts the storms Lothar and Martin, which devastated Europe from west to east a few days before the year 2000.
