= 1968 Scotland storm =

1968 storm in Scotland

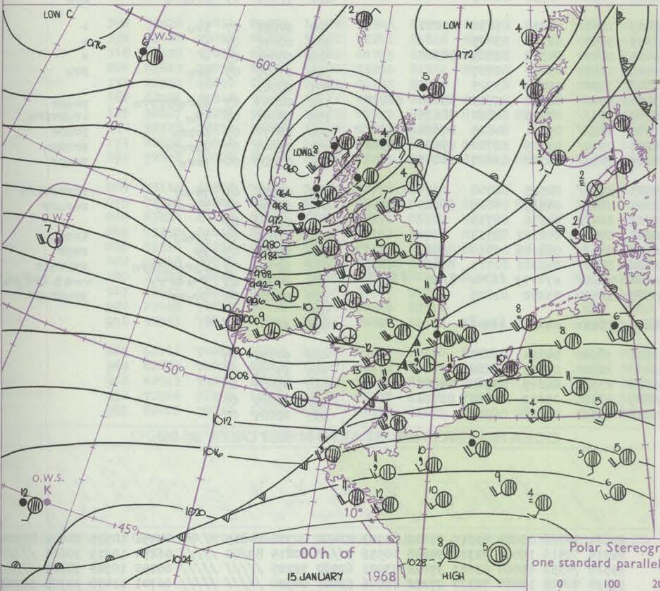
- Synoptic chart of storm by Met Office

Meteorological history
- Formed: 12 January 1968
- Dissipated: 18 January 1968

Extratropical cyclone
- Highest gusts: 134 mph (216 km/h)
- Lowest pressure: 956 mb (28.2 inHg)

Overall effects
- Fatalities: 28
- Injuries: 56
- Damage: £30 million (1968 GBP)
- Areas affected: Scotland, England, Northern Ireland, Denmark

The 1968 Hurricane (or Hurricane Low Q) was a deadly storm that moved through the Central Belt of Scotland during mid January 1968. It was described as Central Scotland's worst natural disaster since records began and the worst gale in the United Kingdom. Some said that the damage resembled what happened during the Clydebank Blitz in 1941. 20 people died from the storm, with 9 dead in Glasgow. 700 people were left homeless. Such high wind speeds in an urban area were equivalent to those witnessed in Paris during Cyclone Lothar in 1999.

A 134 mph (216 km/h) wind gust was recorded at Great Dun Fell in Westmorland, England. At the time this was the strongest wind gust ever recorded in the United Kingdom, though this was superseded in 1986 when a 173 mph (278 km/h) gust was recorded at Cairn Gorm.

The term hurricane is a misnomer as it refers to tropical cyclones originating in the North Atlantic or North Pacific. However the winds were 'hurricane force'.

== Meteorological history ==
The origins of this violent storm appear to be from a cold front near Bermuda on 13 January 1968. The system moved north of the Azores the next day and still appeared as a shallow low pressure area. In the next 24 hours, this low explosively deepened 50 millibars (1½ inches) to 956 mb (28.2 inHg) and passed over Central Scotland. The storm continued to move over Northern Europe before dissipating on 18 January 1968.

== Impact ==
=== Scotland ===
15 January 1968 began as a mild day, then temperatures grew cooler as the day progressed. The highest temperature on that day was 11.8 °C (53.2 °F) at St. James's Park, London and the lowest was 5.1 °C (41.2 °F) at Lerwick, Shetland. The most rainfall on 15 January in the British Isles was 24.9 mm (0.98 in) at South Barrule. In Glasgow alone, over 300 houses were destroyed and 70,000 homes were damaged. Due to the strong winds, half of Glasgow's council houses were damaged. Many people evacuated what were then Europe's tallest flats as they began swaying. Officials said at least seven ships sank or went adrift in the river Clyde causing hundreds of thousands of pounds worth of damage. Off the east coast of Scotland, a drilling rig called Sea Quest was set adrift in rough seas. Over a thousand mature trees were downed in the Central Belt, as well as power lines. In total, the storm felled 30 sq. mi. (8,000 hectares) of forest across Scotland (2 million cu. yd.; 1.6 million cubic metres of timber). A Glasgow police spokesman said that it was 'absolute havoc' in the city. Electrical power also failed in Glasgow, leaving the whole city in darkness.

=== England and Wales ===
In England and Wales, a five-day freeze ended with some roads flooded by up to 3 ft (90 cm) of water. Large waves pounded the English Channel coastline.

=== Wind speeds ===
Measuring station	Wind gust
Great Dun Fell	134 mph (216 km/h)
Tiree	118 mph (190 km/h)
Bell Rock	111 mph (179 km/h)
Cairn Gorm	107 mph (172 km/h)
Leuchars	106 mph (171 km/h)
Turnhouse	104 mph (167 km/h)
Prestwick	104 mph (167 km/h)
Abbotsinch	103 mph (166 km/h)
Copenhagen	92 mph (148 km/h)
Source: Met Office and the Danish Met Service

=== Rest of Europe ===
In Denmark, officials in Copenhagen said that eight people died in the country from the storm.

== Aftermath ==
After the storm moved away, the death toll continued to rise. 30 people died in accidents during subsequent house repairs. On 16 January 1968, about 150 troops from Edinburgh came to Glasgow to help with the clean-up operation. There was little national press coverage of the storm, despite it affecting most of northern England, Northern Ireland and Scotland. An interest-free loan of £500,000 was given by the Labour Government to the affected areas. Singer Frankie Vaughan began to raise funds for the victims of the storm by holding a special concert at Alhambra Theatre in Glasgow.

After the devastation of the storm in the area, the Glasgow City Council quickly imposed a new policy to improve housing in the city.

== See also ==
- Great Sheffield Gale, which caused similar devastation in Sheffield in 1962
- Cyclone Lothar (1999), notable for the prolonged high winds it brought to Paris
