= Great Sheffield Gale =

1962 windstorm in Europe

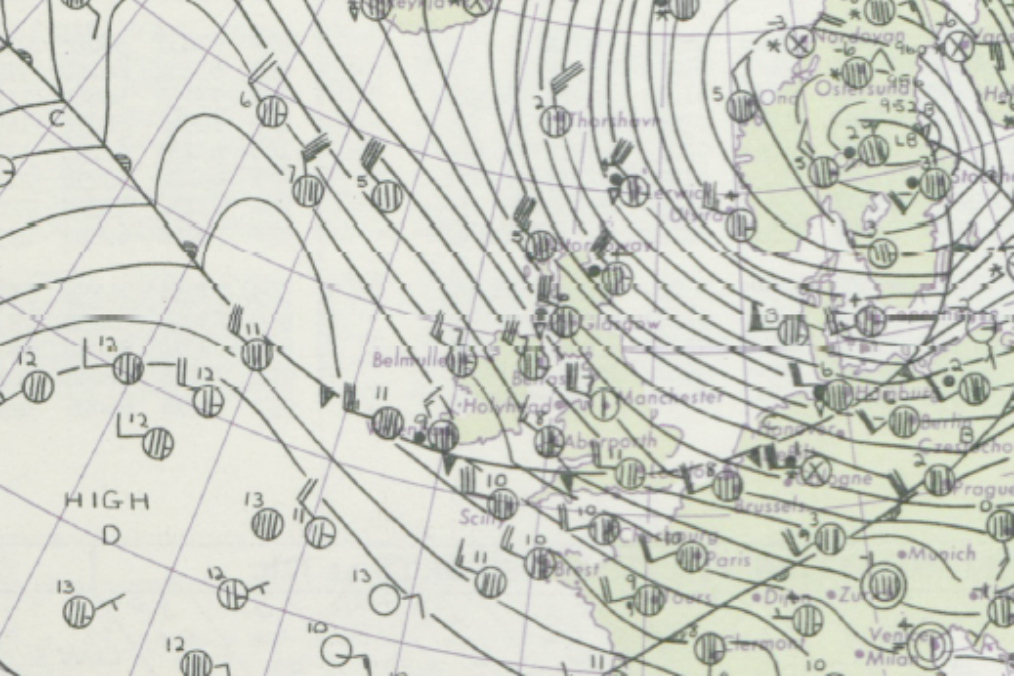
- Synoptic chart of the storm on 16 February

Meteorological history
- Formed: 14 February 1962
- Dissipated: 18 February 1962

European windstorm
- Highest gusts: 119 mph (192 km/h)
- Lowest pressure: 950 mb (28 inHg)

Overall effects
- Fatalities: 9 direct, 347 indirect
- Areas affected: United Kingdom

The Great Sheffield Gale is the name given to an intense European windstorm which crossed the United Kingdom in mid-February 1962, devastating the city of Sheffield in the West Riding of Yorkshire. Nine people were killed across the country, including four in Sheffield; damage in the city was on a widespread and severe scale never before witnessed in a major British city from a European windstorm, and only later matched by the effects of the 1968 Scotland storm in Glasgow.

The extratropical cyclone responsible for the gale subsequently moved over the North Sea, contributing to the North Sea flood of 1962, a storm surge in which at least 347 people died, predominantly in West Germany.

== Meteorological history ==
The extratropical cyclone responsible for the gale likely formed over the North Atlantic Ocean on 14 February 1962, rapidly intensifying as it passed eastwards over Scotland on 15 February before positioning itself over Norway on 16 February, with intense winds on the back side of the intensifying system affecting much of the United Kingdom overnight on 15–16 February. Subsequently, the low moved over northern Germany on 17 February, last being noted the following day.

Being on the leeward side of the Pennines in the prevailing wind direction, Sheffield is usually relatively protected from the effects of high wind events which may have more serious impacts on surrounding areas. However, on this occasion, the winds were funnelled through the valleys of the River Don, River Sheaf and other rivers down into the centre of the city, creating higher wind speeds than seen elsewhere in the country inland and at similar altitudes. The cause of this funnelling effect was a temperature inversion, which meant that high winds generated over the higher ground to the west of the city were unable to escape the surface layer, instead effectively "bouncing" off the underside of the inversion layer and being funnelled down into the lower levels of the city. This also gave the winds a variation variable, gusty and turbulent nature, increasing damage further.

=== Wind speeds ===
Measuring station	Wind gust
RAF Saxa Vord, Unst, Shetland	177 mph (285 km/h)*
Lowther Hill, Lanarkshire	119 mph (192 km/h)
Kirkwall, Orkney	109 mph (175 km/h)
Tiree, Argyll	100 mph (160 km/h)
Sheffield, Yorkshire	97 mph (156 km/h)
Source: Met Office *unofficial station

== Impact ==
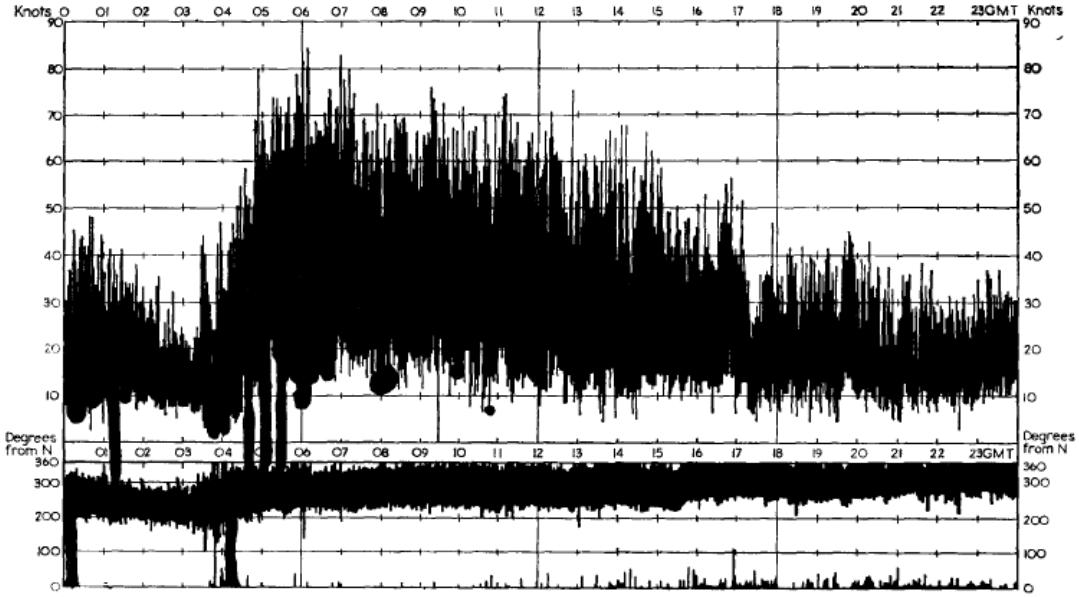
Anemograph trace showing wind speeds in Sheffield on 16 February

=== Sheffield ===
The event was notable for the duration of the destructive winds. As shown on the anemograph trace to the right, wind speeds rose very rapidly from relatively calm to a peak of 97 mph (156 km/h) in Sheffield in the early hours of 16 February, and only slowly decreased throughout the course of the day as the low moved out into the North Sea. The return period for such an intense storm hitting Sheffield is estimated at once every 150 years.

Damage across the city was extensive, totalling more than £5 million (equivalent to more than £115 million in 2021). Four people were killed and more than 400 people were injured by flying debris and collapsing buildings. A floodlight pylon at Bramall Lane football and cricket stadium collapsed onto the field, as did perimeter walls at the Shoreham Street end of the ground. Near Heeley railway station, a full train travelling to Sheffield from London narrowly avoided striking debris on the tracks.

The most widespread damage occurred to pre-fabricated homes on housing estates on the edges of the city, many of which had been hastily constructed to replace houses destroyed in the Sheffield Blitz during the Second World War and, as a result, were not built to a high standard. In Arbourthorne in the south of the city, whole streets of prefabricated homes were flattened. Older properties that had survived the Blitz suffered considerable damage as well, mainly in the form of fallen chimneys and collapsed roofs; all of the deaths recorded in Sheffield were as a result of falling chimneys, either into the property as people sheltered inside or onto the streets outside.

A tower crane on the construction site for the new city centre buildings of the Sheffield College of Technology, now Sheffield Hallam University, collapsed, crashing into the side of the under construction high rises and causing serious damage.

=== Elsewhere ===
Elsewhere in the United Kingdom, six deaths were recorded in relation to the storm, taking the total across the country to nine. A wind gust of 177 mph (285 km/h) was recorded at an unofficial weather station on Unst in the Shetland islands. Electricity supplies were disrupted across the country, with pylons carrying wires over the River Tyne near Newcastle upon Tyne amongst those that were blown down. There was severe disruption to power supplies across southern Yorkshire after the collapse of key power lines in the Knottingley area. Fallen trees and other debris caused disruption to road and rail transport.

== Aftermath ==
Following the storm, the British government declared a state of emergency in Sheffield, designating the city as a disaster area. Emergency services struggled to cope with the scale of the devastation across the city, receiving so many calls that the emergency switchboards repeatedly jammed, preventing others from calling. More than 150,000 homes in the city - or two-thirds of the total housing stock - suffered some form of damage; thousands were damaged beyond repair or totally destroyed, leaving their residents homeless. More than 400 people were treated for injuries.

There were difficulties in finding enough emergency accommodation to temporarily house everybody who had been made homeless from the storm in Sheffield, to the extent that hotel owners as far afield as Blackpool, Cleethorpes and Morecambe offered to host those who had lost their homes. Within Sheffield, schools and churches were used as emergency accommodation.

There was widespread damage to the infrastructure of the city. More than 100 schools across the city were damaged, forcing them to close and limiting emergency accommodation options for those made homeless even further. More than 120 people sought emergency shelter at Hurlfield Secondary School.

== North Sea flooding ==
After passing over the north of the United Kingdom, the deep low responsible for the Great Sheffield Gale moved first over Norway and then, overnight on 16–17 February, down into northern Germany. A storm surge from the low, combined with high tide, contributed to the catastrophic North Sea flood of 1962. Levees protecting the city of Hamburg failed, resulting in the deaths of at least 315 people in that city alone.

== See also ==
- Great Sheffield Flood, a more well-known disaster which devastated the city 98 years earlier
- 1968 Scotland storm, caused similar damage in Glasgow
- Cyclone Lothar (1999), brought similarly prolonged high wind speeds to Paris
