= Cyclone Lothar =

1999 windstorm in Western Europe

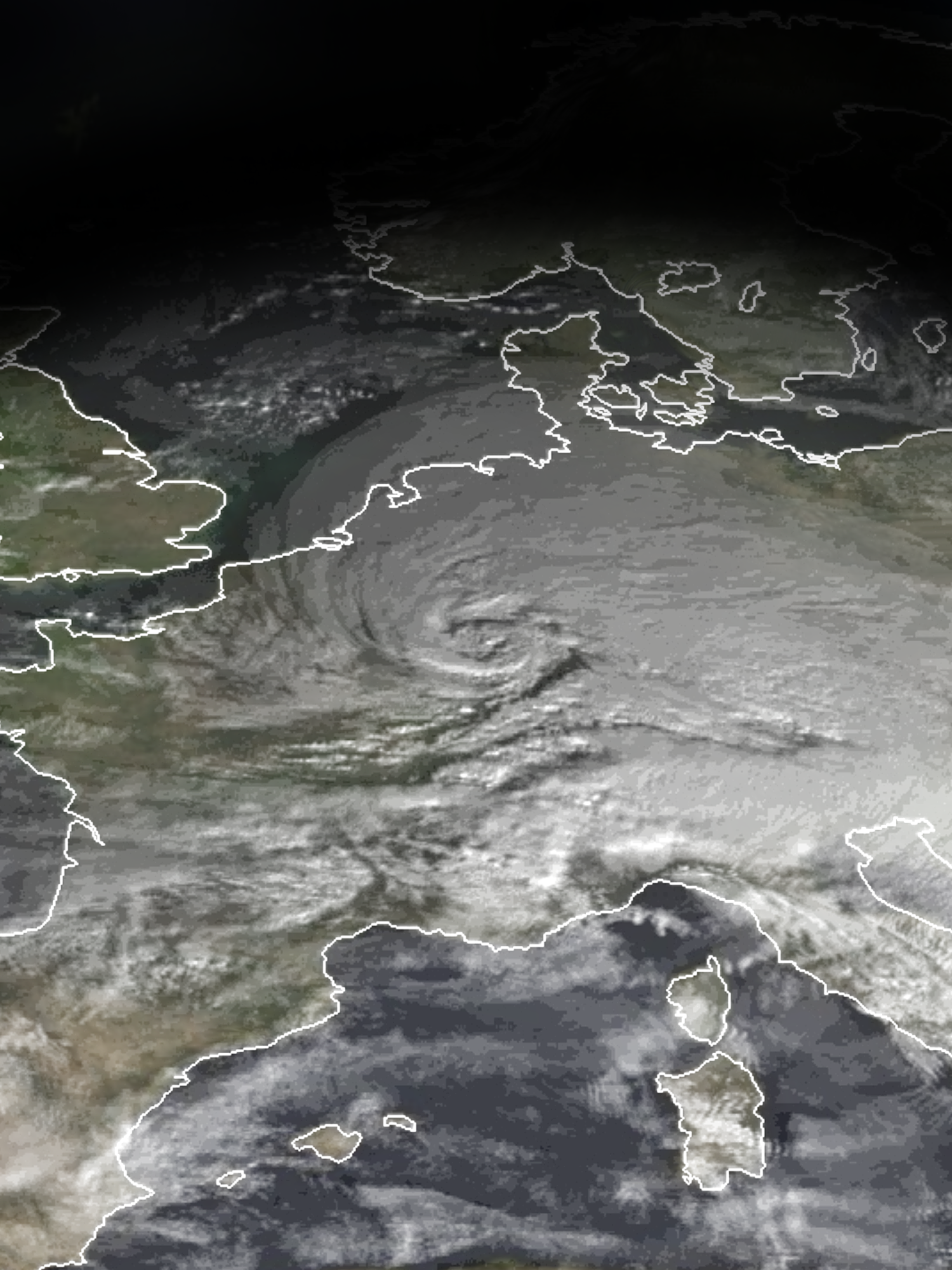
- Satellite imagery of Storm Lothar on December 26

Meteorological history
- Formed: 25 December 1999
- Dissipated: 27 December 1999

Extratropical cyclone
- Highest gusts: 259 km/h (161 mph)
- Lowest pressure: 960 hPa (mbar); 28.35 inHg

Overall effects
- Fatalities: 110
- Damage: €15 billion
- Economic losses: €5.9 billion
- Areas affected: Western Europe
- Part of the 1999–2000 European windstorm season

Cyclone Lothar is regarded as the worst European windstorm recorded during the 20th century. Crossing France, Belgium, Luxembourg and Germany between 25 December and 27 December 1999, Cyclone Lothar's average winds reached up to 115 km/h inland (Orly), but with gusts exceeding 150 km/h, almost equivalent to a Category 2 hurricane, (Note: Gusts reached 180 km/h on the plains of Saint-Sylvain and up to 259 km/h (on Mount Wendelstein in the Bavarian Alps) and 272 km/h (on Mount Hohentwiel north of Lake Constance in Baden-Württemberg) at higher altitudes.) resulting in 110 deaths (including 88 in France alone) and more than €15 billion in damage, becoming the costliest European windstorm ever recorded.

Lothar moved at 100 km/h along an axis from Brittany (about 4 am) to Lorraine (about 9 am) to Alsace (11 am) with a front 150 km wide. It was the second of a series of devastating European windstorms which made landfall in December 1999, occurring around three weeks after Cyclone Anatol, which caused severe damage in Denmark and nearby parts of Sweden and Germany. The day after Lothar moved over western Europe, another intense European windstorm, Cyclone Martin, caused severe damage to the south of Lothar's track.

== Meteorological history ==
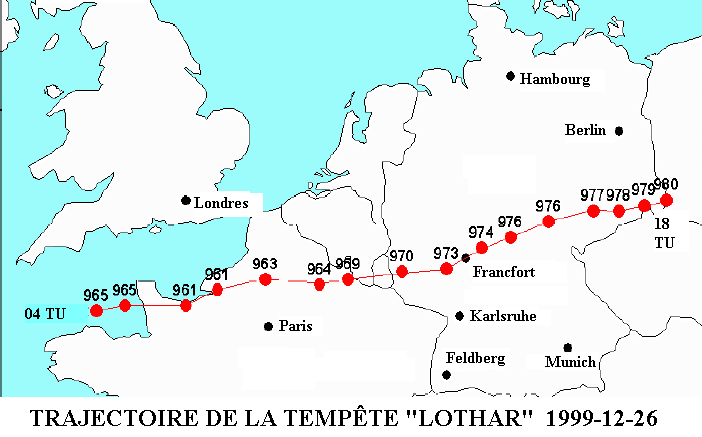
Track of the central low pressure of Lothar

A series of severe winter storms crossed the North Atlantic and Western Europe in December 1999. In early December, Denmark was hit by Cyclone Anatol which caused severe damage there and in neighboring areas. A second storm then crossed Europe on 12 December. Starting on December 20, 1999, the Iceland depression strengthened and created a strong temperature contrast along a polar front across the Atlantic. Meanwhile, a high-pressure system covered Central and Eastern Europe. A very deep and sizable depression moved across Britain on the night of 24–25 December (analysed to have possibly reached a low of 938 mb between Scotland and Norway), this set up a large area of westerly flow into Europe which brought Lothar. This highly unstable situation inevitably meant low predictability, and saw an unusually straight and strong jet stream (similar circumstances were also noted the day before the arrival of the Great Storm of 1987).

Lothar moved rapidly, pushed by a strong jet stream on the morning of December 26, at a speed close to 130 km/h. It reached a central pressure of 985 hPa about 300 km south of Ireland. As it approached the northwest coast of France, the storm slowed to 97 km/h before beginning a rapid intensification phase. The central pressure dropped by 32 hPa in 8 hours, falling to 960 hPa during the storm's passage over Paris, which corresponds to the definition of a meteorological bomb. Its deepening intensified on land due to strong interaction with the high-altitude jet stream, which was close to 400 km/h at 9,000 m altitude.

Lothar was extremely intense and only 300 km in diameter, much smaller than the typical diameter for a mid-latitude depression. Its rapid intensification generated an internal pressure gradient comparable to what is observed in Category 2 hurricanes. Exceptionally strong winds were recorded in an area 150 km south of the depression's center.

Before Lothar dissipated, a new disturbance formed near where Lothar had formed. This storm, called Martin, followed a path 200 km south of Lothar and reached its recorded minimum pressure of 964 hPa. Its winds were at maximum intensity as it approached the French coast on the evening of December 27, comparable to those of Lothar: 190 km/h on the coasts and 158 km/h inland.

Storm Martin then struck France and central Europe from 26 to 28 December 1999. At the end of January 2000 two additional damaging storms crossed Denmark and the northern part of Germany.

== Forecast ==
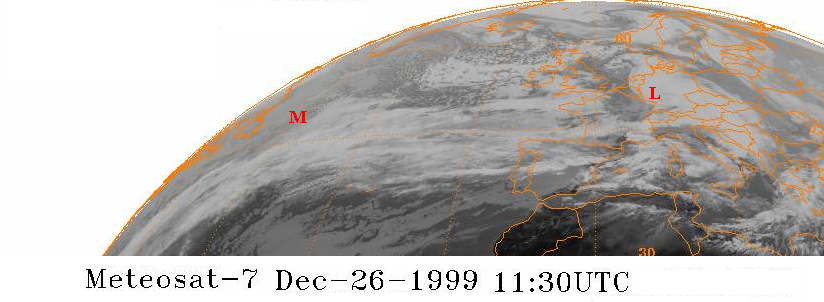
Cyclones Lothar (L) and Martin (M) viewed by satellite, December 26, 1999.

After the problems of the great storm of 1987, European meteorological services greatly improved their numerical weather prediction models, and Météo-France predicted Lothar. However, cyclone Lothar was not well predicted, with one meteorologist later claiming that forecasts could be split into those that were poor and those that were very poor.

According to some forecasts, the storm was predicted to pass through the United Kingdom, while others failed to predict significant intensification at all. The strong jet stream that was the chief cause of the instability was well predicted by the European Centre for Medium-Range Weather Forecasts 9 days earlier. Approximately 24 hours before the storm hit France, Météo-France issued a warning of a strong storm with the correct path, but two hours before the storm hit Paris, inland windspeeds were still predicted to be between 90 and 130 km/h (56 and 81 mph), rather than the 125–175 km/h (78–109 mph) range actually experienced. After the storm, forecasters wondered if additional coastal data could have improved predictions or if the dramatic development of this storm exceeded the capabilities of operational numerical weather prediction models.

MeteoSwiss found the storm Lothar extremely difficult to predict, as even the large forecast models of international weather services initially overlooked the small disturbance above the Atlantic Ocean which formed the storm. Consequently, the power and extent of the storm was only recognized in the early morning of 26 December, which resulted in shorter warning times in Switzerland. In a number of places, officials failed to realize the importance of the warnings, so they were not passed on to the public as they should have been. It is presumed that this occurred because of the holidays.

== Lothar successor ==
A case study of the Manual of Synoptic Satellite Meteorology featured by the Austrian Meteorological Institute (ZAMG) identified an area of secondary cyclogenesis which brought gusts in excess of 90 km/h to Northern France, Belgium and Southwestern Germany. The system formed in the wake of Lothar, and crossed Europe before the arrival of the later Cyclone Martin. The identification of this secondary area and its frontal systems contrasts with the analysis of the German Weather Service which suggested that solely a 'trough line' crossed Germany.

== Highest winds ==
Recorded winds during Lothar, according to the meteorological services of the countries mentioned:

Country	Place	Speed	Country	Place	Speed
France	Ploumanac'h	148 km/h (92 mph)	Switzerland	La Chaux-de-Fonds	134.6 km/h (83.6 mph)
France	Groix	162 km/h (101 mph)	Switzerland	Chasseral	177.5 km/h (110.3 mph)
France	Rennes	126 km/h (78 mph)	Switzerland	La Dôle	201.2 km/h (125.0 mph)
France	Nantes	126 km/h (78 mph)	Switzerland	Geneva	103.7 km/h (64.4 mph)
France	Alençon	166 km/h (103 mph)	Switzerland	Great St Bernard Pass	178.6 km/h (111.0 mph)
France	Rouen	140 km/h (87 mph)	Switzerland	Evolène	124.6 km/h (77.4 mph)
France	Chartres	144 km/h (89 mph)	Switzerland	Lucerne	141.5 km/h (87.9 mph)
France	Paris (Parc Montsouris)	169 km/h (105 mph)	Switzerland	Zurich	157.8 km/h (98.1 mph)
France	Paris Eiffel Tower	>216 km/h (134 mph)	Switzerland	Schaffhausen	162 km/h (101 mph)
France	Orly	173 km/h (107 mph)	Switzerland	Säntis	229.7 km/h (142.7 mph)
France	Dijon	126 km/h (78 mph)	Germany	Weinbiet	184 km/h (114 mph)
France	Metz	155 km/h (96 mph)	Germany	Stuttgart	144 km/h (89 mph)
France	Nancy	144 km/h (89 mph)	Germany	Karlsruhe	151 km/h (94 mph)
France	Colmar	165 km/h (103 mph)	Germany	Großer Arber	162 km/h (101 mph)
France	Strasbourg	144 km/h (89 mph)	Germany	Hohentwiel	272 km/h (169 mph)

== Impact ==
During Cyclone Lothar, wind speeds reached around 150 km/h (93 mph) in low-lying areas and more than 250 km/h (160 mph) on some mountains. In less than half a day the storm tore across France, Belgium and Germany, only finally beginning to weaken as it crossed Poland. The storm's compact internal pressure gradients generated winds which were comparable to those of a Category 2 hurricane.

The Paris region was strongly affected by the storm during the early morning. The Palace of Versailles and its monumental park were considerably damaged (over 10,000 trees were lost within two hours, including valuable specimens planted by Napoleon and Marie Antoinette). Other cultural heritage, forests and public gardens throughout the area were as severely affected by the hurricane-force winds. In Paris, more than 60% of buildings suffered roof damage; in other settlements across northern France, the total approached 80%. Public life was disrupted due to power outages and blocked infrastructure. Besides buildings and infrastructure, forests, such as the Black Forest in Germany, suffered major damage resulting in substantial economic loss.

Lothar and Martin together left 3.4 million customers in France without electricity, and forced Électricité de France to acquire all the available portable power generators in Europe, with some even being brought in from Canada. These storms brought down a quarter of France's high-tension transmission lines and 300 high-voltage transmission pylons were toppled, including 100 during Cyclone Lothar. It was one of the greatest energy disruptions ever experienced by a modern developed country.

=== Damage ===
Insurers and authorities in the affected countries reported that 110 victims total were identified:

Nationality	Deaths
France	53
Switzerland	29
Germany	17

- Economic losses were estimated at 5.9 billion euros (1999).
- Trees knocked down:
  - Baden-Württemberg in Germany: 25 million cubic meters.
  - France: The damage caused by the Martin and Lothar storms that occurred in late December 1999 is indistinguishable. It is estimated that the combined impact of both systems resulted in the destruction of 115 to 140 million cubic meters of wood, which is comparable to the volume carried by an uninterrupted train convoy from Oslo to Gibraltar.
  - Switzerland: 13 million cubic meters of wood.

Lothar is the strongest windstorm on record in Europe since reliable meteorological records have been kept. In terms of comparable events, the Great Storm of 1703 is the closest precedent. This occurred on 7–8 December 1703, in Brittany and southern England, resulting in over 8,500 casualties.

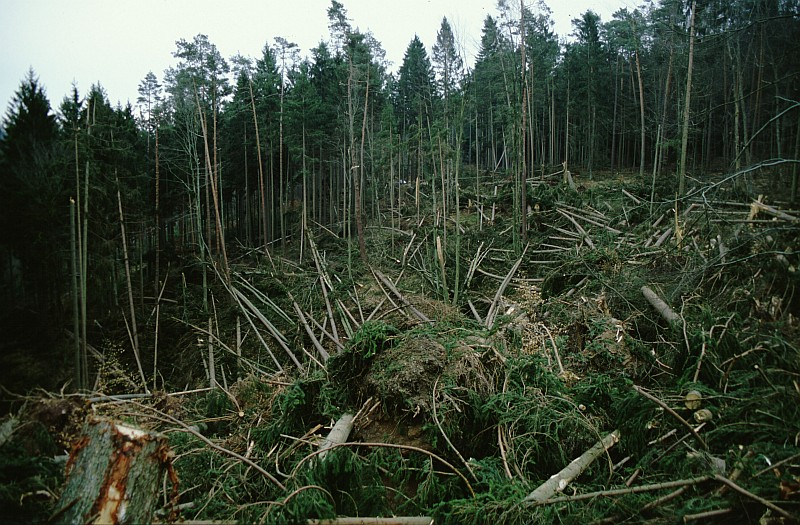
Windthrow in a forest in Arenbachtal, Baden-Württemberg, after the storm.

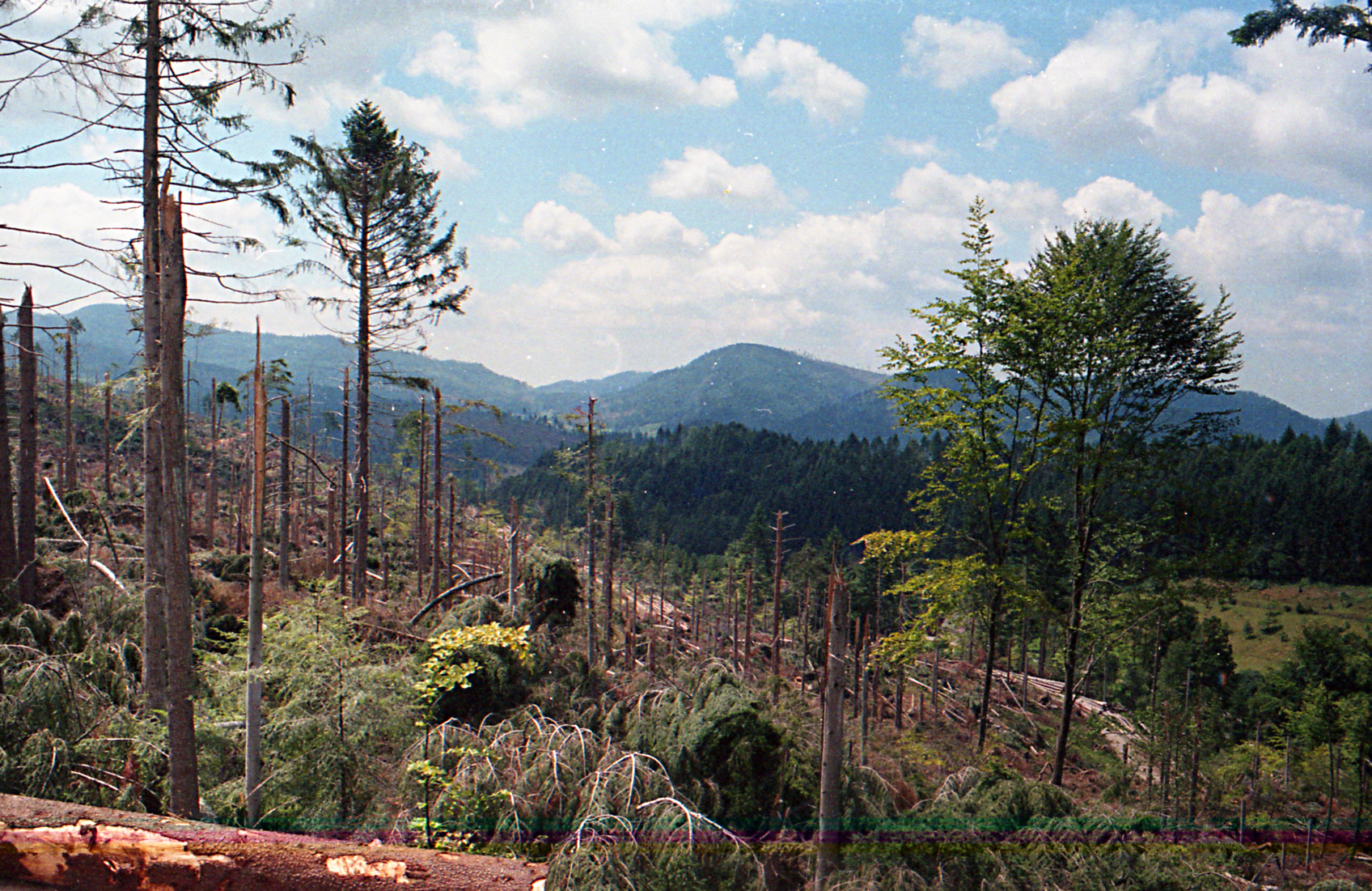
Clearing work in a windthrow area in the Black Forest near Baden-Baden.

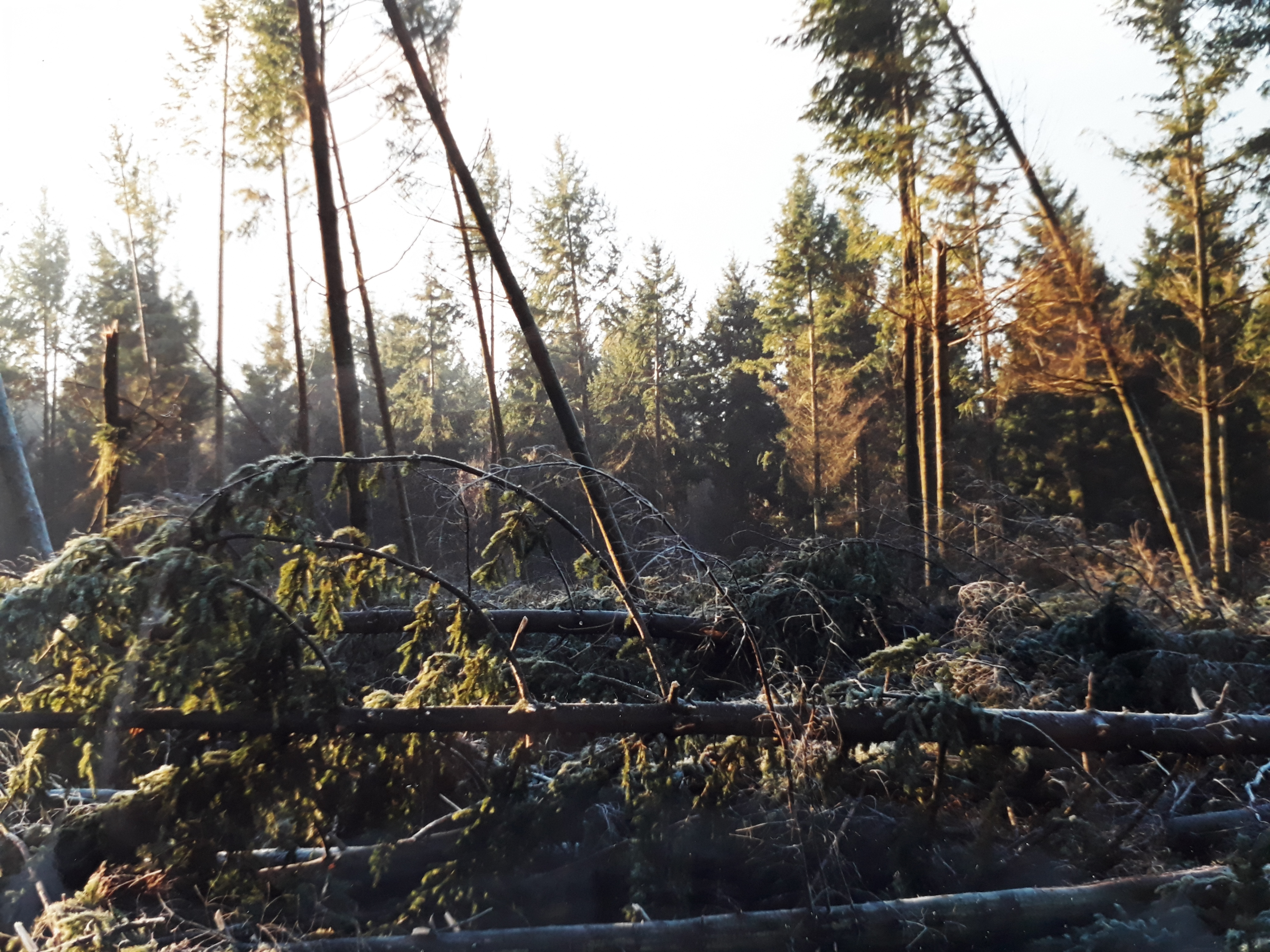
Parcel of Douglas fir trees felled by the storm Lothar on December 26, 1999, in the forest of Fréteval, Loir-et-Cher, France.

== See also ==
- Late December 1999 Storms in Europe

Other European windstorms which brought prolonged high winds to urban areas:

- Great Sheffield Gale, devastated the city of Sheffield, England in 1962
- 1968 Scotland storm, caused severe damage in Glasgow, Scotland
- Cyclone Anatol (1999), another powerful European windstorm which caused widespread destruction a few weeks before Lothar
