= North Sea flood of 1962 =

Natural disaster affecting mainly the coastal regions of Germany

1962 North Sea flood
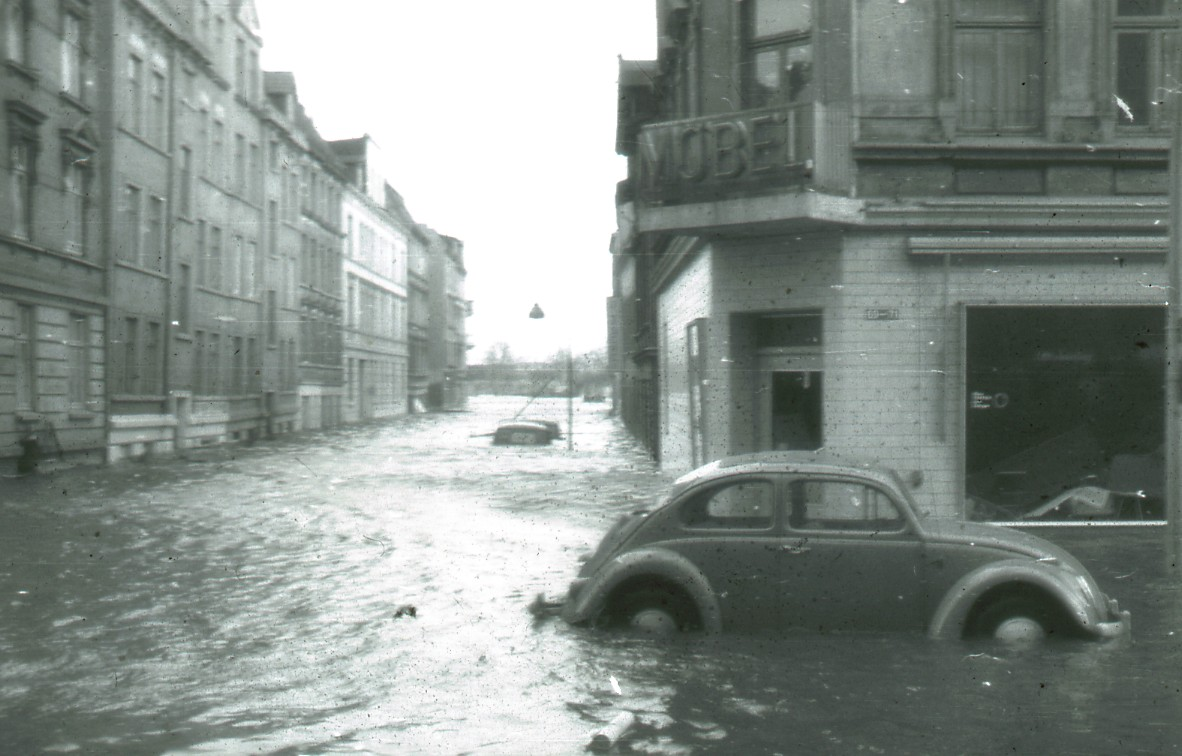
- Flooded streets in Hamburg-Wilhelmsburg

Meteorological history
- Duration: 16–17 February 1962

Overall effects
- Fatalities: 347
- Damage: DM 3 billion (Hamburg only)
- Areas affected: North Sea coast of Germany and the Netherlands

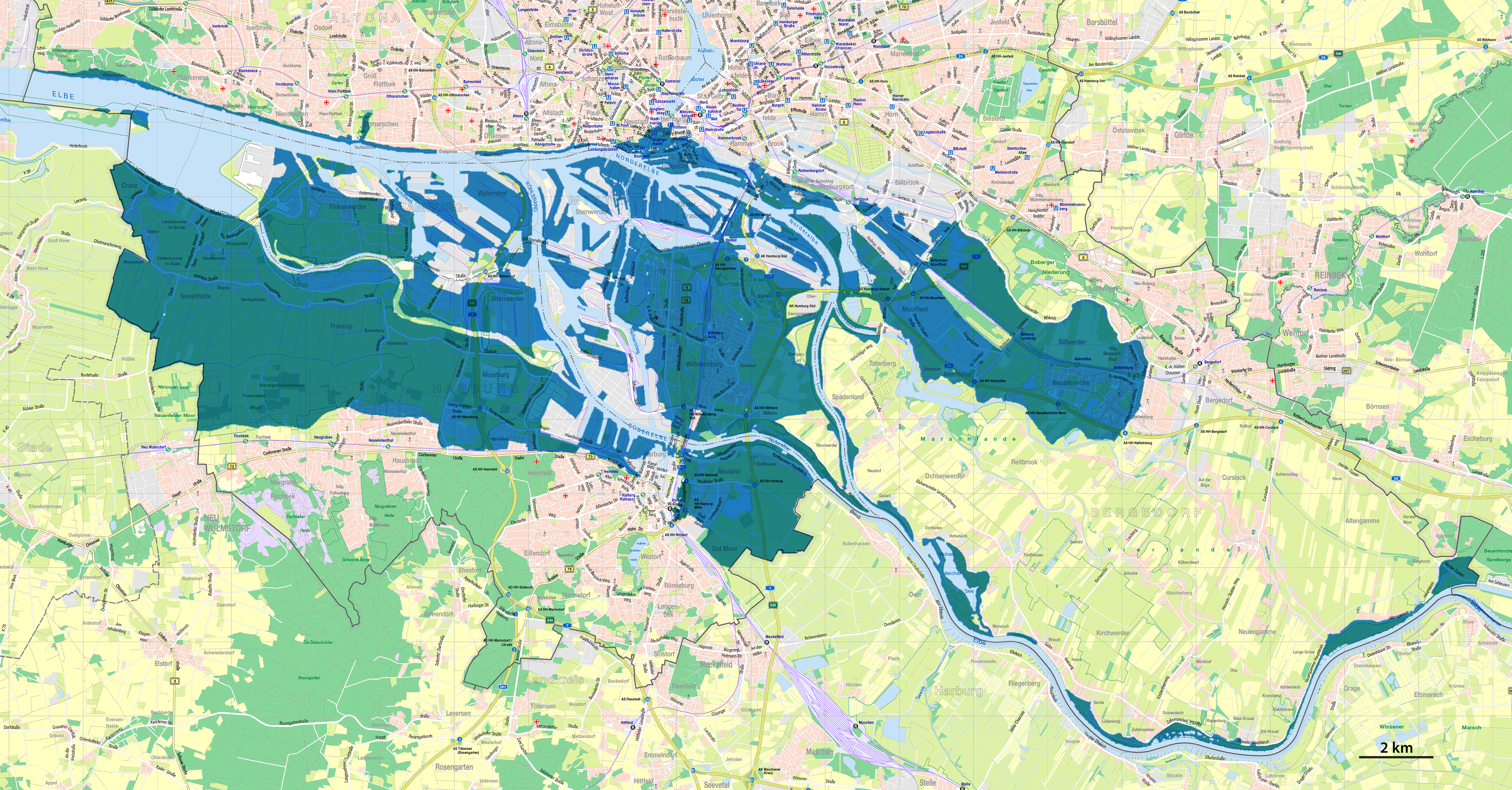
Map of flooded areas of Hamburg 1962

The North Sea flood of 1962 was a natural disaster affecting mainly the coastal regions of West Germany and in particular the city of Hamburg in the night from 16 February to 17 February 1962. In total, the homes of about 60,000 people were destroyed, and the death toll amounted to 315 in Hamburg. The extratropical cyclone responsible for the flooding had previously crossed the United Kingdom as the Great Sheffield Gale, devastating the city of Sheffield and killing nine people.

== Causes ==
The flood was caused by the Vincinette low-pressure system, better known as the Great Sheffield Gale, approaching the German Bight from the North Sea. A European windstorm with peak wind speeds of 200 km/h pushed water into the German Bight, leading to a water surge the dykes could not withstand. Breaches along the coast and the rivers Elbe and Weser led to widespread flooding of huge areas. In Hamburg, on the river Elbe, but a full 100 km away from the coast, the residential areas of Wilhelmsburg were the most affected.

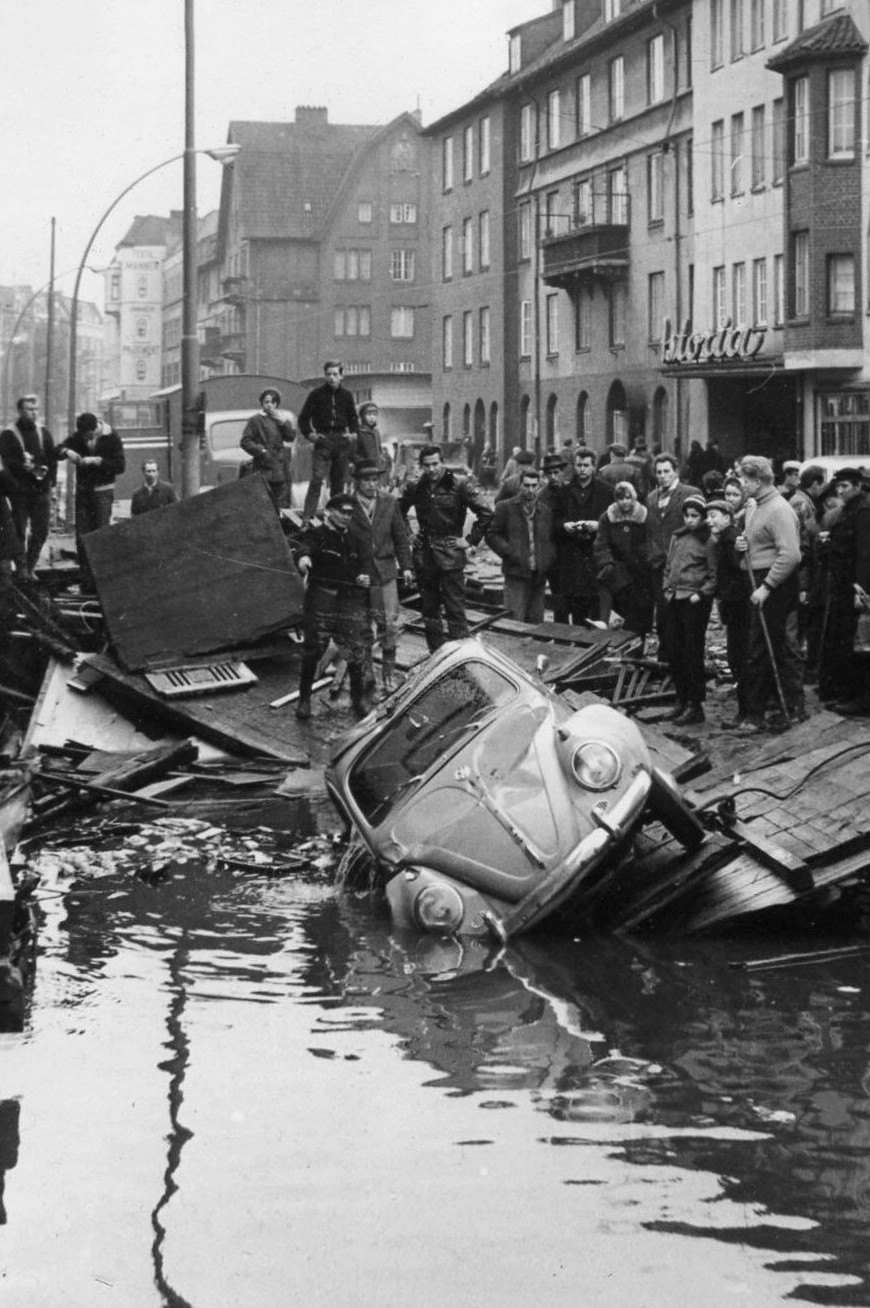
Flood damage on Fährstraße, Hamburg-Wilhelmsburg

On Thursday 15 February, German authorities published the first storm warning for the North Sea with wind speeds up to 9 Beaufort. A severe storm warning followed the next day, with a predicted gauge of 3 metres above normal, which was a level the dykes could withstand.

== The storm ==
The severe storm and the flood it caused in the last hours of 16 February affected the dykes more than predicted and led to some 50 breaches before officials raised the alarm for Hamburg. At this time of the day, most city offices were closed, which slowed the notification of the population. Civil protection plans were not implemented yet.

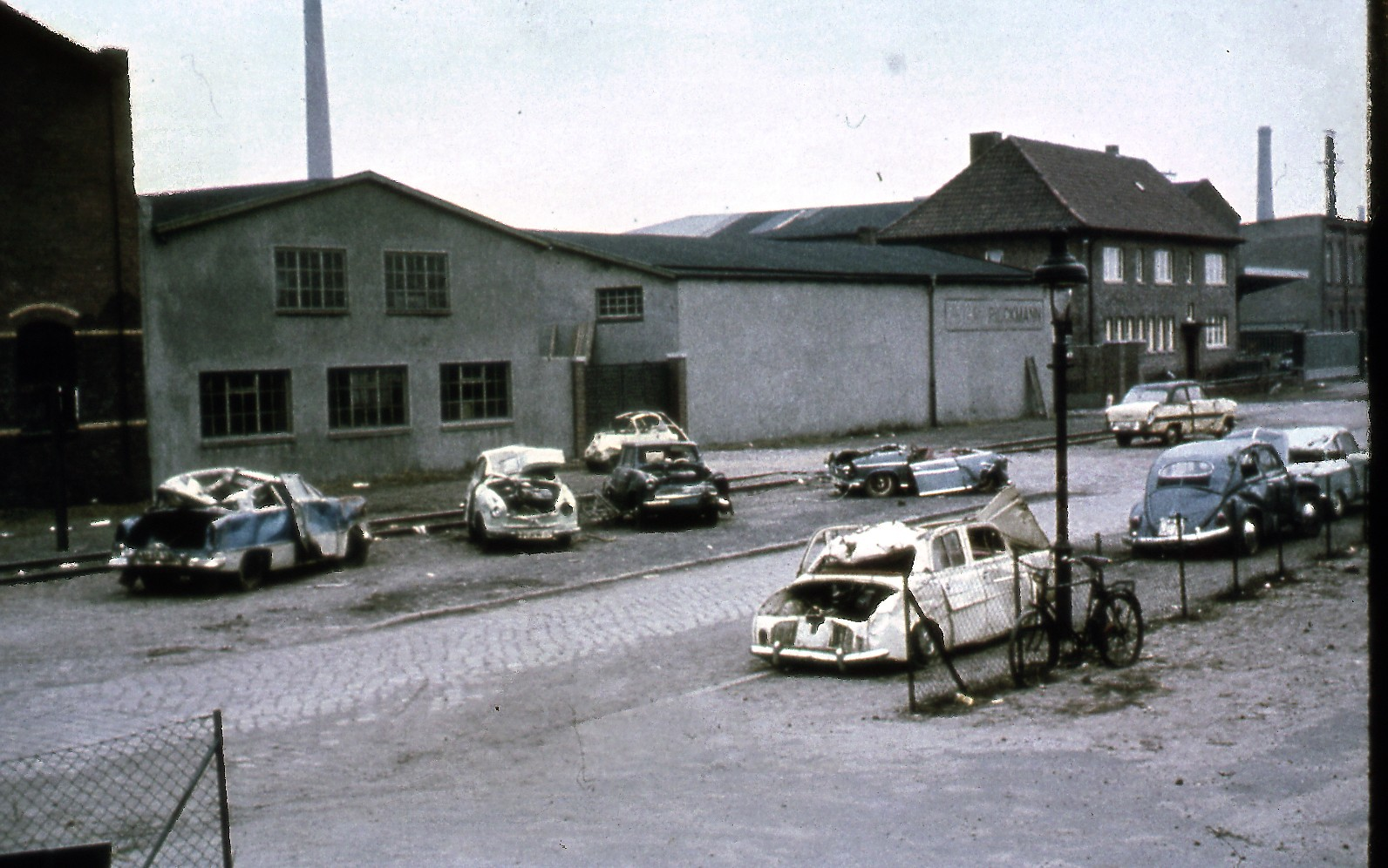
Damaged cars after the flood

Due to telephone landline breakdowns, warnings could not be forwarded from coastal to inland emergency offices. Breakdowns in alarm siren lines and electricity lines severely affected the warning system. Radio amateurs had to establish emergency operations to support emergency services as a means of communication.

Around midnight, the peaks were too high for some dykes to withstand. The backs of the dykes were not fortified, so the first overtopping waters destroyed the dykes from behind and cleared the way for the flood.

Helmut Schmidt, then police senator of Hamburg, coordinated the rescue operations, and requested emergency help from countries throughout western Europe. He also called for elements of the new formed Bundeswehr to assist with the emergency, especially engineers. That meant overstepping his legal authority, ignoring the German constitution's prohibition on using the army for "internal affairs"—a clause excluding disasters was not added until 1968. He also secured the assistance of helicopters from other NATO states.

120 square kilometres or a sixth of the city of Hamburg were flooded, destroying 6,000 buildings. Streets were unusable and railway operations were suspended, which meant supplies could not reach the city.

== Aftermath ==
Greece donated 500 tonnes of raisins to the people of Hamburg after the flood. Afterwards, emergency plans were implemented, and dykes were shortened and strengthened, leaving some river arms and bays cut off from the sea.

== See also ==
- History of Hamburg
- North Sea flood of 1953
- Storm tides of the North Sea
- List of floods in Europe
- List of deadliest floods
