= Cyclone Martin (1999) =

Storm in Europe December 1999

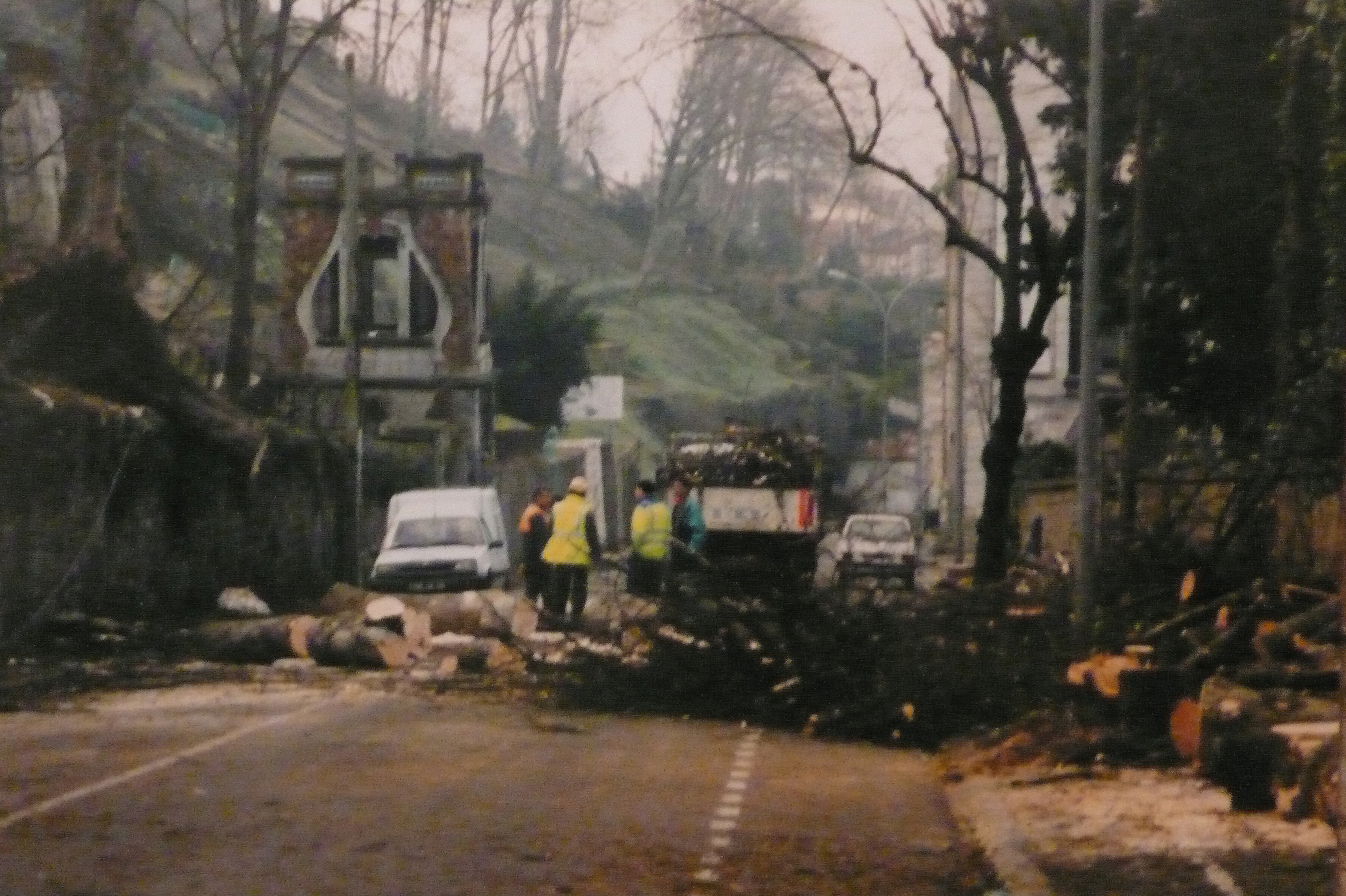
- Clearing damage in Angoulême, 28 December 1999

Meteorological history
- Formed: 26 December 1999
- Dissipated: 28 December 1999

Extratropical cyclone
- Highest gusts: 200 km/h (120 mph)
- Lowest pressure: 962 hPa (mbar); 28.41 inHg

Overall effects
- Fatalities: 30
- Damage: €6 billion (1999)
- Areas affected: France, Spain, Switzerland, Italy
- Part of the 1999–2000 European windstorm season

Cyclone Martin was an extremely violent European windstorm which crossed southern Europe on 27–28 December 1999, causing severe damage across France, Spain, Switzerland and Italy one day after Cyclone Lothar had affected more northerly areas. Wind speeds reached around 200 km/h (120 mph) in French department of Charente-Maritime. The storm caused 30 fatalities and €6 billion in damages. Combined with Lothar, Cyclone Martin is often referred to as the Storm of the Century in western and central Europe.

== Meteorological history ==
December 1999 saw a series of heavy winter storms cross the North Atlantic and western Europe. In early December, Great Britain and Denmark were hit by Cyclone Anatol which caused severe damage in Denmark. A second storm then crossed Europe on 12 December.

A very deep and sizeable depression, named Cyclone Kurt, moved across Britain on the night of 24–25 December, analysed to have possibly reached a low of 938 mb between Scotland and Norway. This set up a large area of westerly flow into Europe, along which Cyclone Lothar was rapidly carried into mainland Europe. This highly unstable situation inevitably meant low predictability, and saw an unusually straight and strong jet stream (similar circumstances were also noted the day before the arrival of the Great Storm of 1987).

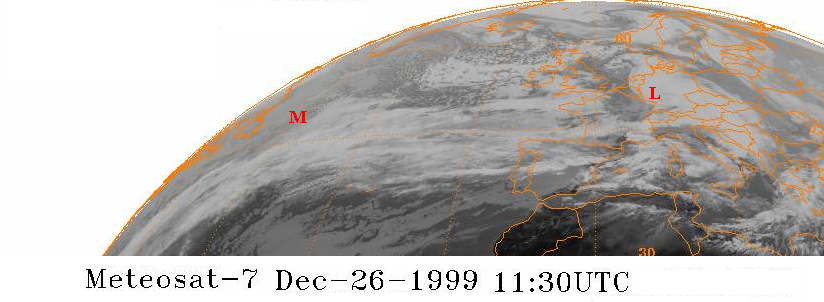
Cyclones Lothar (L) and Martin (M) viewed by satellite on 26 December 1999

Following along the Jet Stream immediately behind Lothar, Cyclone Martin then struck France and central Europe from 26 to 28 December 1999.

Atmospheric conditions remained unstable over western Europe, and at the end of January 2000 two additional damaging storms crossed Denmark and the northern part of Germany.

== Aftermath ==
Cyclone Martin caused extensive damage to property and trees across southern France. In terms of felled trees, 13 million m^{3} (460 million ft^{3}) of wood in Switzerland and 140 million m^{3} (4,900 million ft^{3}) were felled in France. The French and German national power grids were also left badly affected, with more than 200 electricity pylons destroyed.

Buildings and infrastructure suffered major damage throughout Martin's path, and mains power and safety systems were knocked out in many places. The storm surge from Cyclone Martin led to severe flooding at the Blayais Nuclear Power Plant, resulting in a Level 2 nuclear incident on the International Nuclear Event Scale.

== Highest winds ==
Below is a table of the highest wind speeds recorded during Cyclone Martin.

| Country | Place | Speed |
|---|---|---|
| France | Saint-Denis-d'Oléron (17) | 198 km/h (123 mph) |
| | Royan (17) | 194 km/h (121 mph) |
| | Cap Ferret (33) | 173 km/h (107 mph) |
| | Île d'Yeu (85) | 162 km/h (101 mph) |
| | Clermont-Ferrand (63) | 159 km/h (99 mph) |
| | La Rochelle (17) | 151 km/h (94 mph) |
| | Limoges (87) | 148 km/h (92 mph) |
| | Bordeaux (33) | 144 km/h (89 mph) |
| | Toulouse (31) | 141 km/h (88 mph) |

== See also ==
- Late December 1999 Storms in Europe
- Cyclone Anatol
- Storm Lothar
