= Cyclone Anatol =

European windstorm in 1999

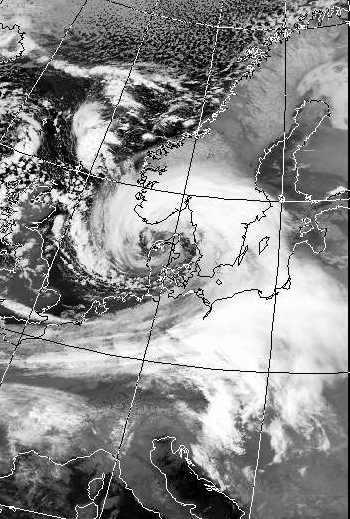
Infrared satellite image of Anatol over Northern Europe, 3 December 1999 at 1625 UTC

Cyclone Anatol was a European windstorm that hit Denmark, Southwest Sweden, and Northern Germany on 3 December 1999. The storm had sustained winds of 146 km/h and wind gusts of up to 184 km/h, equivalent to an intense category 1 hurricane, which is unusually strong for storms in Northern Europe. The storm caused 20 fatalities; in Denmark alone 7 died and more than 800 were injured.

According to the Danish Meteorological Institute, the storm was the strongest storm of the 20th century in Denmark and is estimated to have caused damage in Denmark of DKK 13 billion (c. US$2 billion). In addition to wind damage, it caused major floods in coastal regions of the southeastern North Sea, reaching a high point of c. 5.5 m (18 ft) above normal sea level in southwestern Jutland, despite peaking during low tide. This is the second-highest ever recorded in the region (after the Burchardi flood of 1634) and had it peaked during high tide instead, it would likely have reached 6.5–7 m (21–23 ft), which by far would have been the highest ever recorded and near the top of the dikes protecting the town of Ribe.

== Name ==
Anatol is the name given to the storm by the Free University of Berlin and the Deutscher Wetterdienst. The Danish TV2 channel named it Adam. The storm was also often referred to as Århundredets orkan (storm of the century) or Decemberorkanen (December Storm) in Denmark, and commonly as Carolastormen or Orkan Carola (Storm Carol) in Sweden.

The storm is referred to as an "orkan" in Scandinavia and Germany, which is translated as hurricane in those languages. However, unlike the English term hurricane that only refers to tropical cyclones in the Atlantic, the term "orkan" is used for any storm that reaches 12 on the Beaufort scale.

== See also ==
- Cyclone Lothar
- Cyclone Martin (1999)
- Storm Lothar
