= Storm David =

European windstorm in 2018

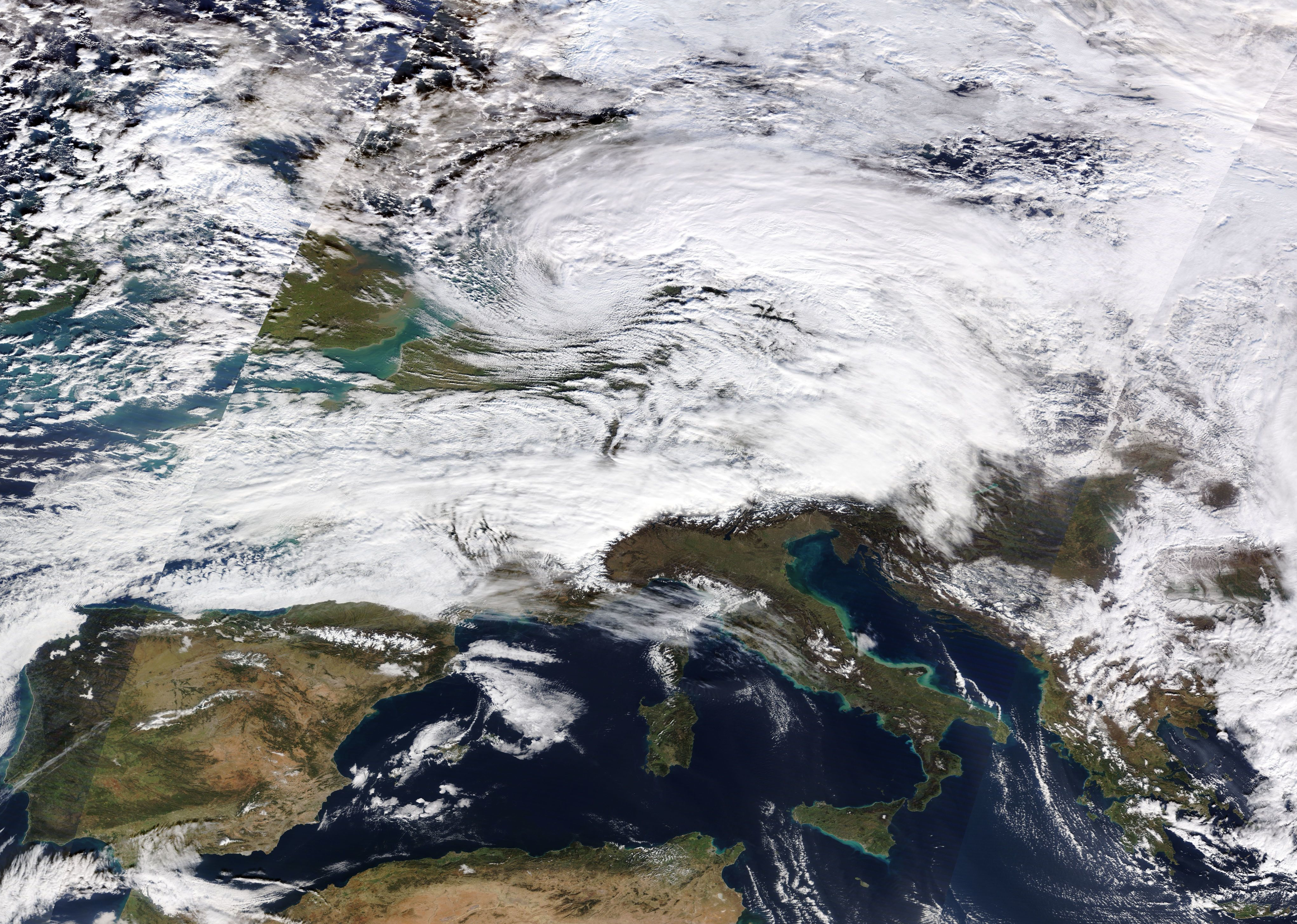
- David on 18 January 2018, approximately centred above the Benelux or Western Germany

Meteorological history
- Formed: 16 January over Newfoundland
- Dissipated: 22 January over Western Russia

Extratropical cyclone, European windstorm, winter storm, blizzard
- Highest gusts: 150 km/h (93 mph), Capel Curig, Wales (alt 216 m [709 ft]) 203 km/h (126 mph), Brocken, Saxony-Anhalt (at altitude)
- Lowest pressure: 974 hPa (28.8 inHg)

Overall effects
- Fatalities: 13 direct, 2 indirect
- Damage: €1.14bn – 2.6bn
- Areas affected: Ireland, UK, France, Benelux countries, Germany, Switzerland, Austria, Italy, Poland, Czech Republic, Slovakia, Belarus, Ukraine, Russia
- Power outages: 471,000+
- Part of the 2017–18 European windstorm season

Storm David (also called Cyclone Friederike in Germany) was a compact but deadly European windstorm that heavily affected the British Isles, France, Benelux, Central Europe, Northern Italy, Poland and parts of Eastern Europe in early 2018 with widespread hurricane-force gusts and severe snowfall, creating blizzard conditions in some areas. The storm caused extensive damage and traffic disruption. It was given the name David by Météo France while the FUB named it Friederike.

== Meteorological history ==
On 14 January a weak low pressure area in the Southern Caribbean developed a trough to its northeast. During the formation of the trough, weather in the North Atlantic was dominated by the strong Icelandic Low Fionn (called Evi by the Free University of Berlin) that itself brought windy conditions to Greenland, Iceland and Scotland and bottomed out at a very intense central low pressure of 935 hPa (27.6 inHg). At that time, a very intense jet stream was prevalent in the North Atlantic, driven by the powerful arctic low. Thus, two of the main global weather prediction centres, GFS and ECMWF, predicted Fionn to steer the new cyclone into Europe, leading to an impact on the British Isles and Continental Europe. By that time, the track and intensity of the new storm were not clear. Likewise it was unclear if the new weather feature would affect Europe as a cyclone or if it would remain an open trough until it arrives.

By 16 January the trough now stretched from its Southern Caribbean origin to eastern Newfoundland. During that day, the trough developed a circulation centre near its northern end (Newfoundland), forming closed isobars around it which indicate a closed wind circulation and qualify the system as an extratropical cyclone. Hours after formation, the storm was caught by Fionn's strong jetstream and started moving to the east, posing a threat to Europe. While crossing the Atlantic, David once again lost some structural definition and opened up into a trough under the strong influence of Fionn. The weakened David was racing eastward through the North Atlantic, taking aim at the British Isles. Meanwhile, the ECMWF and GFS lowered their predictions concerning David's intensity as it was unclear if the system would be able to recover from the structural deterioration that was inflicted by Fionn. David would cross the North Atlantic in less than two days.

While David was approaching Ireland in the evening of 17 January, Fionn started to weaken as its centre began to fill. David managed to redevelop a closed circulation while passing over the British Isles and the North Sea in the morning of 18 January, worsening the risks for Central and Eastern Europe. Britain received some hurricane-force gusts up to 150 km/h (93 mph). Subsequently, the storm had some hours to gain additional energy while moving quickly over the North Sea before making landfall in the Netherlands. The cyclone's minimal pressure bottomed out at 974 hPa (28.8 inHg) while centred over the North Sea, which was substantially lower than predicted by GFS and ECMWF. Hoek van Holland, where the storm made the first of its two landfalls in the Netherlands, experienced wind gusts up to 143 km/h (89 mph). Moving on, the winter storm rampaged in Germany, disrupting public transport services as it already did in the Benelux and causing ten deaths on 18 January. While centred over Germany, the storm still was near peak intensity, having a central pressure between 976 and 979 hPa (28.8 and 28.9 inHg), and caused widespread gusts in the 121–137 km/h (75–85 mph) range, with gusts up to 203 km/h (126 mph) on mountains. During the evening of 18 January, the eastward moving centre of David crossed the Polish border and weakened to 985 hPa (29.1 inHg). David weakened to a regular low pressure area as its winds fell below storm force on 19 January. It continued its eastward motion through Belarus and the westernmost part of Russia. The southern flank of the low also affected the weather in Slovakia and Ukraine. On 22 January 2018, being located over western Russia, David merged with another weak low that was located over Scandinavia. Thus, David dissipated as a meteorological entity.

Satellite loop of Friederike (David) airmass from EUMETSAT.

David was a compact and fast-moving cyclone, which is typical for systems that are steered by strong Icelandic lows which develop a strong easterly flow on their southern side. Similar to Fionn, David itself had its main wind field located to the south of its centre; the northern semicircle featured comparatively low winds but was more intense in terms of precipitation. Heavy snowfall occurred on the northern flank of the storm, causing blizzard conditions in some areas.

== Impact ==
Impacts of Cyclone David
Country	Deaths	Damage (euros as of 2018)	Power outages	Ref
Ireland	0	Unknown	Unknown	
United Kingdom	0	Unknown	140,000	
France	0	Unknown	11,000	
Netherlands	3	90 million	Unknown	
Belgium	1	50 million	Unknown	
Luxembourg	0	Unknown	Unknown	
Germany	8 (2)	1 billion	240,000	
Austria	0	Unknown	Unknown	
Switzerland	0	Unknown	Unknown	
Italy	1	Unknown	Unknown	
Czech Republic	0	Unknown	30,000	
Poland	0	Unknown	50,000	
Total	13 (2)	1.14bn–2.6bn	471,000	

Beginning on 16 January, prior to David's arrival, the very deep and large arctic low Fionn battered the British isles with high winds. Storm conditions also occurred in other parts of Western and Central Europe in the middle of January 2018 (even affecting Corsica). The intense winds were caused by an extensive "squeeze in isobars" that, probably amongst other meteorological factors, was caused by Fionn's great depth and extension. During that time, David was crossing the Atlantic and fluctuated in intensity, leading some models to a rather optimistic forecast.

Nevertheless, David managed to begin a strengthening trend while crossing the British isles the night between 17 and 18 January. Thus, the fast-moving cyclone delivered winds up to 153 km/h (95 mph) and heavy snowfall in Britain, creating blizzard conditions there. Windthrown trees blocked roads and rail routes. Approximately 140,000 households in Britain were temporarily without power.

The Netherlands were even worse affected by the cyclone. All flights were cancelled at Amsterdam Airport Schiphol. The rail transportation system was also completely defunct due to windthrow. Because of thrown trees and high winds, road traffic was, as well, nearly impossible and life-threatening. Winds up to 140 km/h (87 mph) knocked down trucks and cost three people's lives in the Netherlands. In the neighbouring country of Belgium, similar conditions occurred, leading to the death of one woman. Furthermore, while the cyclone was centred over the Benelux, the northern French region of Hauts-de-France was lashed by winds up to 122 km/h (76 mph).

Maximum gusts of Cyclone David
Country	Lowland (<200 m)		Upland (200 – 500 m)		Highland or mountains (>500 m)	
Country	highest gust	alt [m]	highest gust	alt [m]	highest gust	alt [m]
Ireland	109 km/h (68 mph); Shannon Airport	14	93 km/h (58 mph)^{[a]} Ireland West Airport	203	0	0
United Kingdom	134 km/h (83 mph); Tibenham	17|17	150 km/h (93 mph); Capel Curig	216	78 km/h (48 mph)^{[a]}^{[c]} Great Dun Fell	847
France	136 km/h (85 mph); Cap Gris-Nez	30	0	0	119 km/h (74 mph); Embrun	817
Belgium	119 km/h (74 mph); Deurne, Antwerp	12	93 km/h (58 mph)^{[a]} Marche-en-Famenne	294	96 km/h (60 mph)^{[a]} Mt. Rigi	671
Netherlands	143 km/h (89 mph); Hoek van Holland	11	0	0	no such elevation	n.a.
Luxembourg	81 km/h (50 mph)^{[a]} Wasserbillig	136	98 km/h (61 mph)^{[a]} Useldange	280	102 km/h (63 mph)^{[a]} Esch-sur-Sûre	520
Germany	146 km/h (91 mph); Kabelsketal	126	144 km/h (89 mph); Beverungen-Drenke	242	203 km/h (126 mph); Brocken	1153
Switzerland	no such elevation^{[b]}	n.a.	96 km/h (60 mph)^{[a]} Steckborn	398	165|165 km/h (103 mph); Pilatus	2132
Austria	69 km/h (43 mph)^{[a]} Seibersdorf	185	104 mph (167 km/h)^{[a]} Linz Airport	313	148 mph (238 km/h)^{[a]} Feuerkogel	1618
Czech Republic	93 km/h (58 mph)^{[a]} Doksany	159	107 km/h (66 mph)^{[a]} Ústí nad Labem	379	173 km/h (107 mph); Sněžka	1602
Poland	93 km/h (58 mph)^{[a]} Wrocław	124	115 km/h (71 mph); Bielsko-Biała	365	126 km/h (78 mph); Kasprowy Wierch	1987
Slovakia	0	0	0	0	137 km/h (85 mph)^{[a]} Chopok	2012

Germany received the worst impacts by the cyclone that crossed the country on a track from Lower Saxony to Southern Brandenburg on 18 January. The main wind field on the southern side of the storm led to widespread gusts up to 133 km/h (83 mph) over a region ranging from North Rhine-Westphalia to Saxony. David featured wind gusts higher than 200 km/h (120 mph) on a few German mountains, reaching their maximum on the Brocken in Saxony-Anhalt (203 km/h [126 mph]). Simultaneously, the northern areas of Germany that were spared by the worst wind received heavy snowfall, especially the northeast. Deutsche Bahn, the country's main railroad company, halted most of its railroad transportation services since the ferocious winds and the subsequent windthrow made many railroad tracks impassable. 100,000 power cuts in North Rhine-Westphalia and 140,000 in Eastern Germany are known to have occurred at some moment on 18 January. Similarly to the situation in the Netherlands, several flights were cancelled in Germany and road transportation was limited. The pilots who were arriving in Germany and the Netherlands had to perform crosswind landings in order to land their planes in the dangerous conditions, although luckily no aviation accidents are known to have occurred because of the storm. German emergency services received thousands of calls. Eight direct fatalities and numerous injuries were caused by David in Germany. Two indirect fatalities occurred in a traffic jam that was caused by the cyclone in Saxony. Despite David's compact structure, the southern neighbor countries of Germany (Austria and Switzerland) were affected by the high winds and intense snowfall of the cyclone as David's outer bands hit the Alps. Furthermore, the traffic of the Alpine countries was negatively affected by the nearly complete halt of rail and road traffic in Germany. Even Italy, where one man died, felt some effects of the storm. In Poland, the weakening system caused traffic disruptions and some infrastructural damage, causing 50,000 power outages. The Czech Republic was inflicted some damage and power outages, too. Road and railroad traffic in Czech Republic was hampered too. In particular, some train lines that connected the Czech Republic to Germany were halted as Germany was the most affected country. 30,000 power outages were registered in the Czech Republic.

As a preliminary total, 15 deaths (13 direct and 2 indirect) and 471,000 power outages are known to have occurred Europe-wide due to the effects of the storm. David/Friederike is estimated to have caused €1bn in damage in Germany alone, while the damage total in whole Europe could be as high as €2.6bn.

== Reactions and naming controversy ==
Prior to the arrival on 17 January the cyclone received the names David by Météo France and Friederike by the Free University of Berlin. In contrast, the Met Office did not give the storm a name from its official naming list. They did not expect the storm to affect the British Isles that is intense enough to justify the usage of a storm name. Only a few hours prior to David's impact, cyclone Fionn was dominating the interaction of the two lows, weakening David into a trough, making the struggling David seem relatively harmless. As David restrengthened just before making landfall on the British Isles and inflicting unexpectedly high damage, the Met Office became subject to criticism by the British public and media. Contrastingly, the DWD (German Meteorological Office) took David seriously and classified it a major windstorm (Orkan) for its widespread hurricane-force (Bft. 12) gusts. In Germany, only exceptionally strong storms are given that title. Most storms in Germany are called Sturmtief (windstorm), a storm category which was assigned to Xavier and Herwart beforehand, two of 2017–18 season's most important storms in Germany. According to the DWD, David was the worst storm to affect central Germany since Kyrill. As a precaution, many schools in Germany remained closed and entering many forests was forbidden on 18 January.

== See also ==
Synoptic chart of Fionn (as a "squeeze in isobars") 16–17 January preceding David moving towards Ireland visible on the last two frames from KNMI

- Cyclone Kyrill - major European windstorm that affected Europe exactly 11 years earlier and took a similar eastward track over the North Atlantic and the European continent
- Cyclone Fionn/Evi for more information about the synoptical weather situation in the middle of 2018's January and about the naming controversy concerning Fionn and David. Fionn was a very intense Icelandic low that bottomed out at 935 hPa (27.6 inHg) and steered David over the North Atlantic into Europe and itself affected the British Isles for some days before David arrived.
- Cyclone Herwart - European windstorm with similar structure (compact wind field on the south side; steered by a bigger low in the north) whose main wind field took a similar, eastward track through Germany and Eastern Europe less than two months beforehead

== Notes ==
1. Note a: These gust speeds have not been retrieved from official storm summary gust lists, but instead manually selected from source. Higher gusts matching the specific criteria might have occurred since this website features an extensive, but incomplete set of weather stations. The altitudes of the weather stations that measured these wind speeds have been retrieved from the same source.
2. Note b: The lowest altitude in Switzerland is 193 m (633 ft). Since winds are usually measured 10 m (33 ft) above the surface, no officially valid wind speeds below an altitude of 200 m (660 ft) can be measured in this country.
3. Note c: The 78 km/h (48 mph) gust was registered on 17 January 2018 21:00, when David started to affect Great Britain. Just 13 hours earlier, a 133 km/h (83 mph) gust was registered at the same station, but, since David was racing east at a translational speed of up to 100 km/h (62 mph), cannot be attributed to David since David was well offshore at 08:00. Thus, it is probably more precise to attribute the 133 km/h gust to Cyclone Fionn since it dominated the weather in the North Atlantic just before David arrived.
