= Storm Emma (2018) =

European windstorm of 2017–18

Meteorological history
- Formed: 26 February 2018
- Dissipated: 5 March 2018

Extratropical cyclone, European windstorm, Winter storm, Blizzard
- Maximum snowfall or ice accretion: 63 centimetres (25 in) Little Rissington

Overall effects
- Areas affected: Western Europe

Storm Emma, also called Ulrike, was a deep depression which was part of the 2017–18 European windstorm season. As it interacted with Anticyclone Hartmut, a cold wave, Emma's warmer damp air rode over the cold air that had been over Western Europe for a few days, leading to heavy snow falls of up to 57 centimetres (22 in).

It brought a renewed push of cold air to much of the United Kingdom with temperatures falling as low as −11 °C (12 °F) in Nairnshire. The worst affected areas were southwest England and southern Wales.

== Snowfall, and temperatures ==
=== Snowfall ===
Although the maximum snow fall was 57 centimetres (22 in), most places affected reported a general total of 50 centimetres (20 in). Snowfall was reported along the coast of Italy and French Riviera for the first time since 2010 and UK since 29 September 2017. Snow also fell in Barcelona, a rare occurrence for the region, disrupting Formula One car testing ahead of the 2018 season.

=== Temperatures ===
Throughout the storm, the temperatures were very low with Cairn Gorm recording a daytime high of −11.8 °C (10.8 °F) on 1 March. However, more generally places saw maximum temperatures between −5 and −3 °C (23 and 27 °F).

== Effects ==
Holyhead Marina in Holyhead, North Wales was destroyed due to the storm on 1–2 March 2018.

== See also ==
- Other storms named Emma
- Storm Larisa, which brought heavy snowfall to the United Kingdom in March 2023
