= 2017–18 European windstorm season =

- First storm formed: 12 September 2017
- Last storm dissipated: 17 June 2018
- Strongest storm^{1}: Fionn – 935 hPa (27.6 inHg)
- Strongest wind gust: Ana – 249 km/h (155 mph; 134 kn), Austrian Alps (11 December)
- Total storms: 18
- Total damage: over £7.3 billion (€8.6 billion)
- Total fatalities: 130
- ^{1}Strongest storm is determined by lowest pressure and maximum recorded non-mountainous wind gust is also included for reference.

The 2017–2018 European windstorm season was the third instance of seasonal European windstorm naming. France, Spain and Portugal took part in winter storm naming for the first time this season.

The season started on 12 September 2017 with the formation of Storm Aileen. It was subsequently marked by many high-impact storms which caused severe loss of life and widespread damage, including Ophelia, Eleanor, David and Emma. The season concluded on 17 June 2018 with the dissipation of off-season Storm Hector.

== Background and naming ==
In 2015, the Met Office and Met Éireann announced a pilot project to name storm warnings as part of the Name our Storms project for wind storms and asked the public for suggestions. The meteorological offices produced a full list of names for 2015–16 and 2016–17, common to both the UK and Ireland. A new list of names was released on 6 September 2017 for the 2017–18 season. Names in the UK will be based on the National Severe Weather Warning Service, when a storm is assessed to have the potential for an Amber 'be prepared' or Red 'take action (danger to life)' warning.

A storm will be named when it is deemed able to have a "substantial" impact on the UK or Ireland. They will be taken from the list, in alphabetical order, alternating between male and female names—the same naming convention that is used by the United States for tropical cyclones. In the case of storms resulting from ex-tropical storms and hurricanes, the original name allocated by the US National Hurricane Center will be used, an example of which during this season being Ophelia. Met Éireann name any storm which triggers a status Orange or Red weather warning for wind. The basis for such, as outlined on their weather warning service, are mean wind speeds in excess of 80 km/h (50 mph; 43 kn) or gusts over 130 km/h (81 mph; 70 kn). Similarly, the Met Office name storms that have the potential to cause medium (Amber) or high (Red) impacts to the UK. It describes the wind strength relative to observations such as "falling trees or tiles, other items like garden furniture being blown around and even a number of properties left without electrical power."

On 1 December 2017, the national meteorological services of Spain (Aemet), France (Météo-France) and Portugal (IPMA) announced that they would begin naming storms affecting their nations in co-ordination, under the auspices of EUMETNET.

=== United Kingdom and Ireland ===
- Aileen
- Brian
- Caroline
- Dylan
- Eleanor
- Fionn
- Georgina
- Hector
- Iona (unused)
- James (unused)
- Karen (unused)
- Larry (unused)
- Maeve (unused)
- Niall (unused)
- Octavia (unused)
- Paul (unused)
- Rebecca (unused)
- Simon (unused)
- Tali (unused)
- Victor (unused)
- Winifred (unused)

The Met Office's and Met Éireann's announcements of the season's names also noted that Fionn is to be pronounced Fyunn, Niall is to be pronounced Nye-ul and Tali is to be pronounced Tarly.

=== France, Spain and Portugal ===
- Ana
- Bruno
- Carmen
- David
- Emma
- Felix
- Gisele
- Hugo
- Irene
- Jose (unused)
- Katia (unused)
- Leo (unused)
- Marina (unused)
- Nuno (unused)
- Olivia (unused)
- Pierre (unused)
- Rosa (unused)
- Samuel (unused)
- Telma (unused)
- Vasco (unused)
- Wiam (unused)

=== Other naming systems ===
One former Atlantic hurricane transitioned into a European windstorm and retained its name as assigned by the National Hurricane Center in Miami, Florida:

- Ophelia

Another internationally recognised, but unofficial, naming system for European windstorms is the Adopt a Vortex program of the Free University of Berlin. Participants can ask the FUB to give their names, for example as a birthday present, to high or low pressure systems that affect European weather. The naming service of the FUB is commercial and is the main meteorological naming system in Germany. The names Xavier and Herwart were given by the FUB to major storms this season. Its naming program is recognised in some other European countries, although the British-Irish and the French-Spanish-Portuguese naming co-operations are gaining importance. Furthermore, besides of the three internationally recognised naming systems (the two European co-operations and the FUB system), many European countries (Norway, Finland, Denmark etc.) give their own names to cyclones. One of the 16 storms of the season was not named by the three main naming systems: instead it was called Cora in Norway and Aku in Finland.

== Season summary ==
The 2017–18 UK and Ireland windstorm season began on September with storm Aileen, which brought strong winds to Scotland and Northern England on 13 September. Then followed Ophelia which was once a Category 3 major hurricane and the easternmost major hurricane on record; a red (severe) wind warning was issued for many parts in Ireland. Less than a week later, storm Brian rapidly intensified from a trough of low pressure out in the Atlantic. After a rather quiet November without any named systems (like quiet Septembers and Octobers of the previous two years), Caroline and Dylan formed in December followed by Eleanor early in January 2018. In the middle of January, the extremely deep and large arctic low Fionn affected both the UK and Ireland and steered David, a smaller but more intense storm, on a westerly track over Ireland, the UK and Central Europe. The last storm in January was Georgina, a cyclone that mainly affected Ireland and Scotland.

A total of 10 storms affected both the UK and Ireland in that season. Three of these—Ophelia, David and Emma—were named by foreign agencies. Six storms were named by the new co-operation of the meteorological services of France, Spain and Portugal. Two of these—David and Emma—also affected Britain and Ireland significantly.

The impact of the deadly winter storm Emma was intensified by the collision with the Beast from the East cold wave (anticyclone Hartmut). Cora, another significant windstorm, affected Scandinavia, Norway and Sweden in particular. Cora delivered the highest known gust of the European windstorm season. As a European total, 18 windstorms (one "off-season") affected the continent.

== Storms ==
=== Storm Aileen ===
Aileen
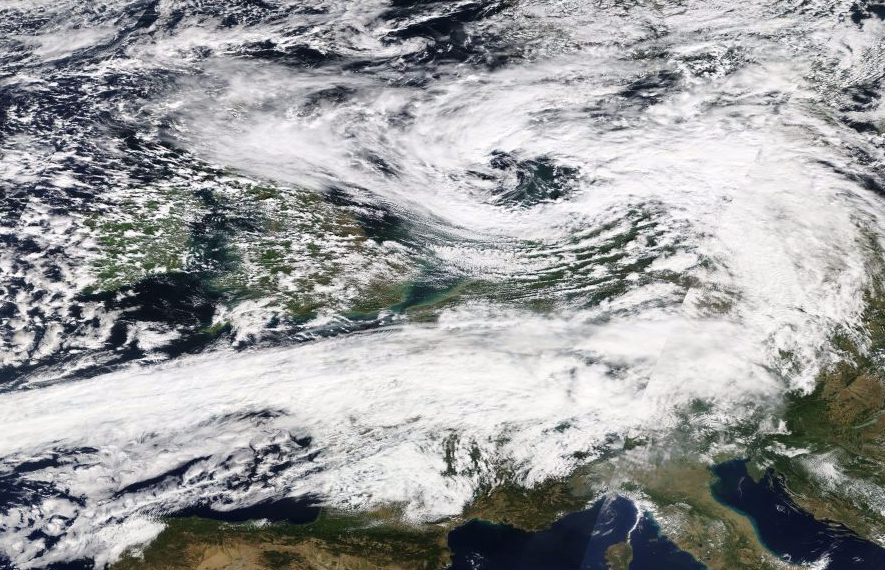
- Aileen located over the North Sea on 13 September 2017
- Area affected: Northwestern Europe
- Date of impact: 12–18 September
- Maximum wind gust: 161 km/h (100 mph; 87 kn) Borkum Island, Germany
- Lowest pressure: 978 hPa (28.9 inHg)
- Fatalities: 3
- Power outages: 69,000
- Damage: > £8 million (€10 million)

Aileen formed on 12 September, with the Met Office issuing an Amber wind warning, becoming the first named storm of the season. Aileen affected Cheshire, Lancashire, Derbyshire, Yorkshire, Nottinghamshire and Lincolnshire during the evening of 12 September and into the morning of 13 September with winds of over 65 km/h (40 mph; 35 kn). Gusts up to around 110 km/h (68 mph; 59 kn) were also seen in exposed locations such as along coastlines and over high ground in these areas. A Yellow weather warning for rain was also issued for parts of Northern Ireland, northern England and southern Scotland, as Aileen dropped 30–40 mm (1.2–1.6 in) of rain within 6–9 hours in these areas, causing some disruption from localised flooding. The heaviest rainfall was recorded at Bainbridge, North Yorkshire, with 35.4 mm (1.39 in) falling overnight.

During Aileen, approximately 60,000 homes in Wales and almost 9,000 across England suffered power cuts. The strongest gusts, of 83 mph (134 km/h; 72 kn), were recorded at The Needles, Isle of Wight. The strongest gust on mainland Britain, of 74 mph (119 km/h; 64 kn), was recorded at Mumbles, Wales.

Aileen later crossed the North Sea and intensified, going on to affect Germany, where it was known as Cyclone Sebastian.

=== Ex-Hurricane Ophelia ===
Ophelia
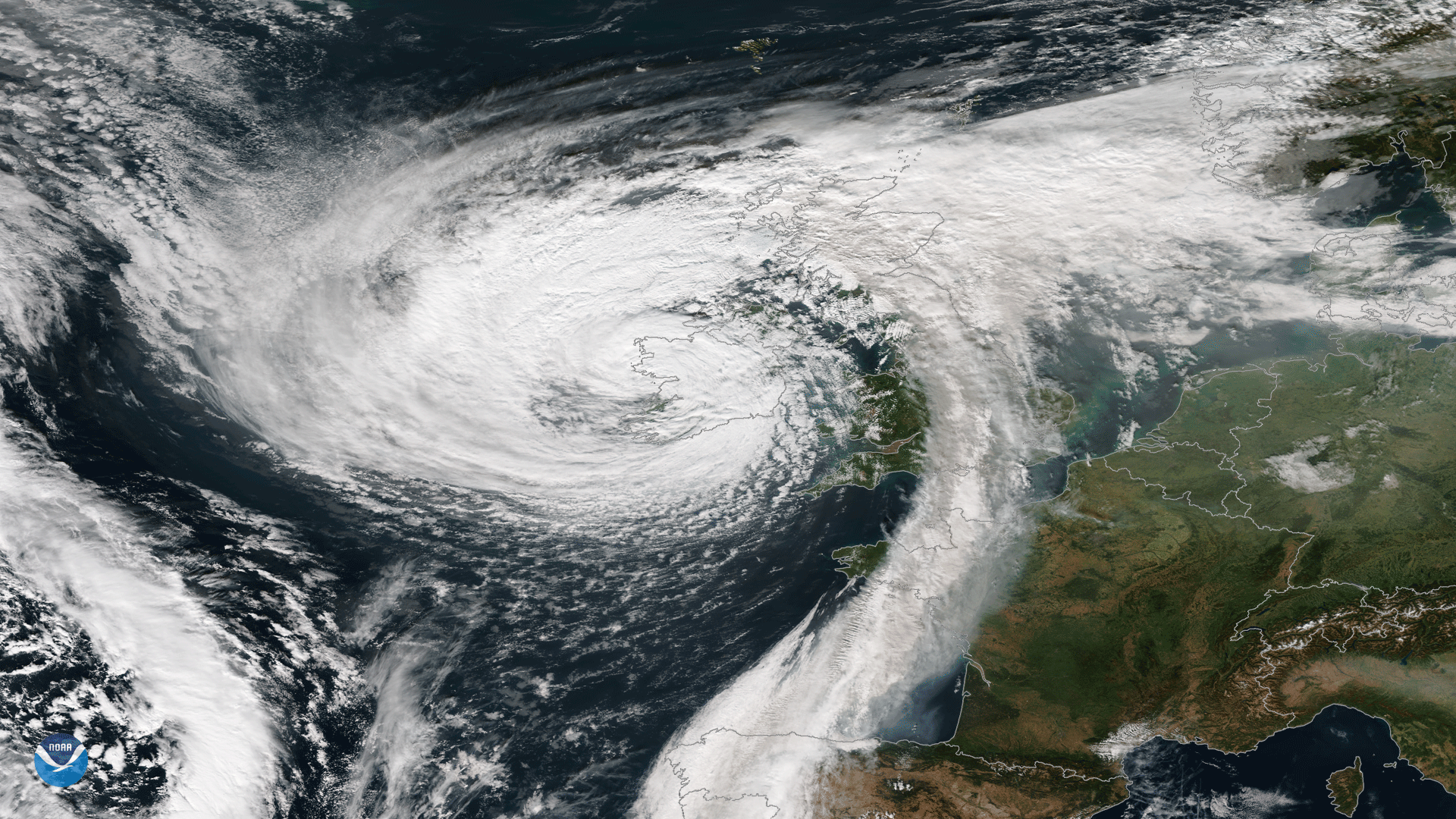
- Ex-Hurricane Ophelia moving over Ireland on 16 October
- Area affected: Portugal, Spain, France, Ireland, United Kingdom, Faroe Islands, Norway
- Date of impact: 16–20 October
- Maximum wind gust: 191 km/h (119 mph; 103 kn) at Fastnet Rock, Ireland
- Lowest pressure: 958 hPa (28.3 inHg)
- Fatalities: 3
- Power outages: 360,000
- Damage: > £75 million (€90 million)

On 12 October, the Met Office issued yellow weather warnings relating to the extra-tropical remnants of the former Hurricane Ophelia, estimated to affect the UK and Ireland on 16 October. Met Éireann issued an update on 12 October in response to media coverage about possible impacts which might occur in Ireland, highlighting the uncertainties still in the forecast modelling. Met Éireann asked people to keep up to date with changes in the forecast as the storm evolved and confidence in any likely impacts increased. On 14 October Met Éireann issued a red warning for the counties of Galway, Mayo, Clare, Cork and Kerry for 16–17 October, (extended to Limerick, Waterford and Wexford on 15 October) with an orange warning for the rest of the country. Red warnings were extended again on the evening of 15 October to the whole of Ireland. On 15 October the Met Office issued amber warnings for the six counties of Northern Ireland, and updated the yellow warnings in place for England, Wales and Scotland. The Met Office updated its amber warnings to include parts of west Wales, southwest Scotland and the Isle of Man on the morning of 16 October.

In County Waterford, a woman was killed when a tree fell on her car, caused by the winds from Ophelia's remnants. A man died near Dundalk, County Louth, after a tree struck his car. A man was killed in Cahir, County Tipperary, while trying to clear a fallen tree with a chainsaw. Two more people were subsequently killed in Ireland from the combined effects of Ophelia and the subsequent Storm Brian.

=== Storm Brian ===
Brian
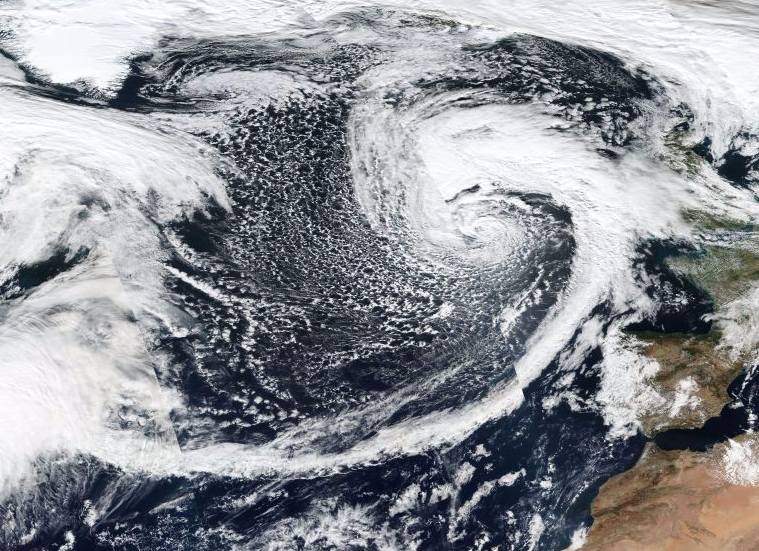
- Brian located over the eastern Atlantic on 20 October
- Area affected: Ireland, United Kingdom, northern France
- Date of impact: 19–23 October
- Maximum wind gust: 137 km/h (85 mph; 74 kn) Needles, United Kingdom
- Lowest pressure: 956 hPa (28.2 inHg)
- Fatalities: 3
- Power outages: Unspecified
- Damage: Minimal

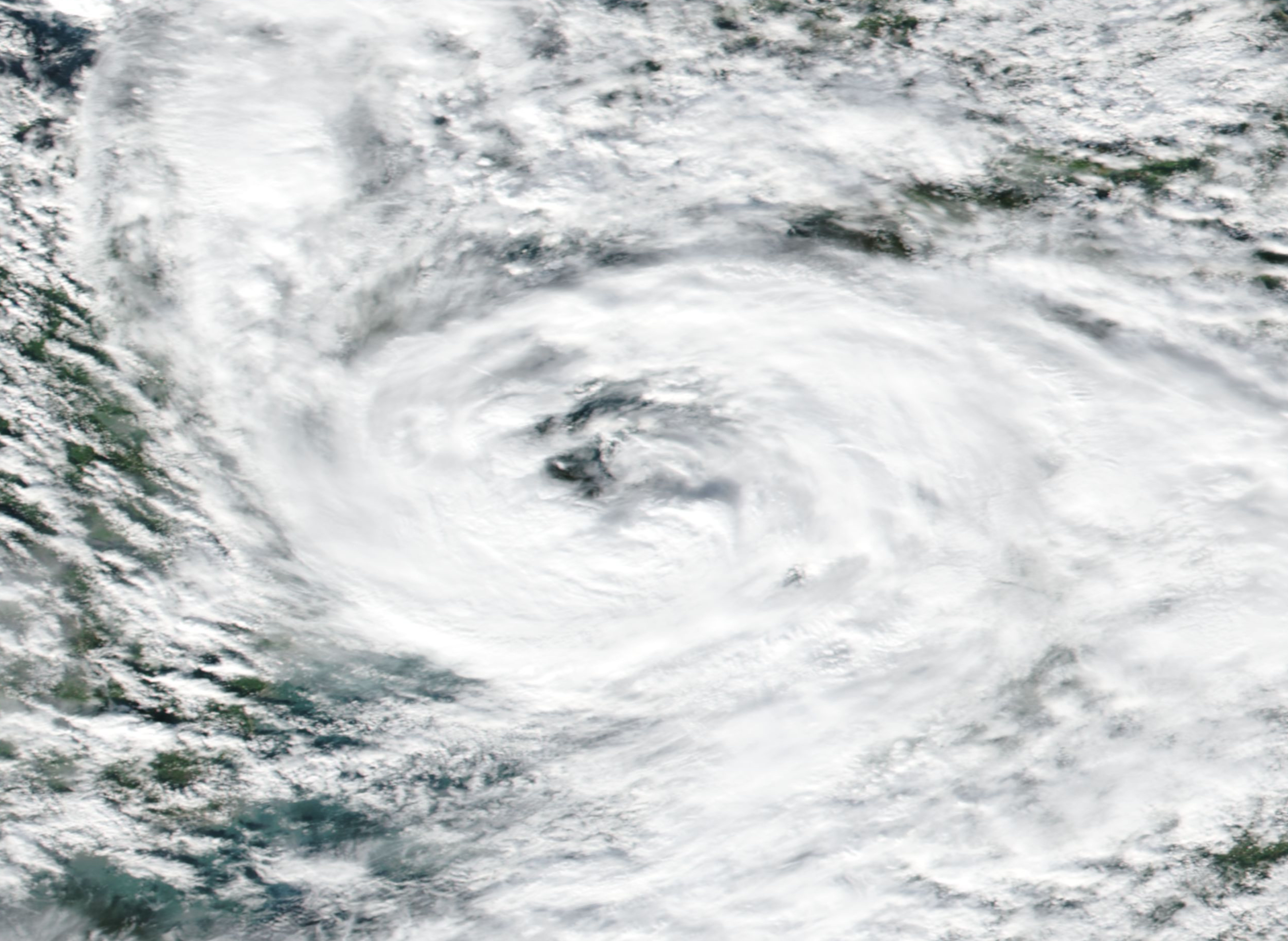
Brian over the Irish Sea on 21 October

On 13 October, the US National Hurricane Center designated a tropical wave in the Atlantic Ocean to the east of the Lesser Antilles as Invest 92L, giving the system a 40% chance of developing into a tropical cyclone. The NHC continued monitoring the system as it moved slowly north-west, bringing heavy rainfall and flooding to Puerto Rico and the British and US Virgin Islands before turning to the north-east. However, on 16 October, the NHC discontinued monitoring the system as it passed Bermuda without any considerable impact, having failed to transition into a tropical cyclone.

Subsequently, the area of low pressure began to rapidly intensify as it accelerated eastward across the open Atlantic, developing into a powerful extratropical cyclone. On 19 October, Met Éireann issued an orange wind warning for 21 October in counties Galway and Mayo, thus naming storm Brian. On 20 October Met Éireann extended orange warnings to the counties of Clare, Kerry, Waterford and Wexford. The UK Environment Agency warned that storm Brian could combine with high tides and lead to a heightened risk of flooding on the south coast of the UK.

Brian moved over Ireland close to Galway around 07:00 local time on 21 October.

A 67-year-old man drowned after being swept from the sea wall at Dawlish during the storm. Two more people were killed in Ireland from the combined effects of Brian and the prior Ex-Hurricane Ophelia.

=== Storm Caroline ===
Caroline
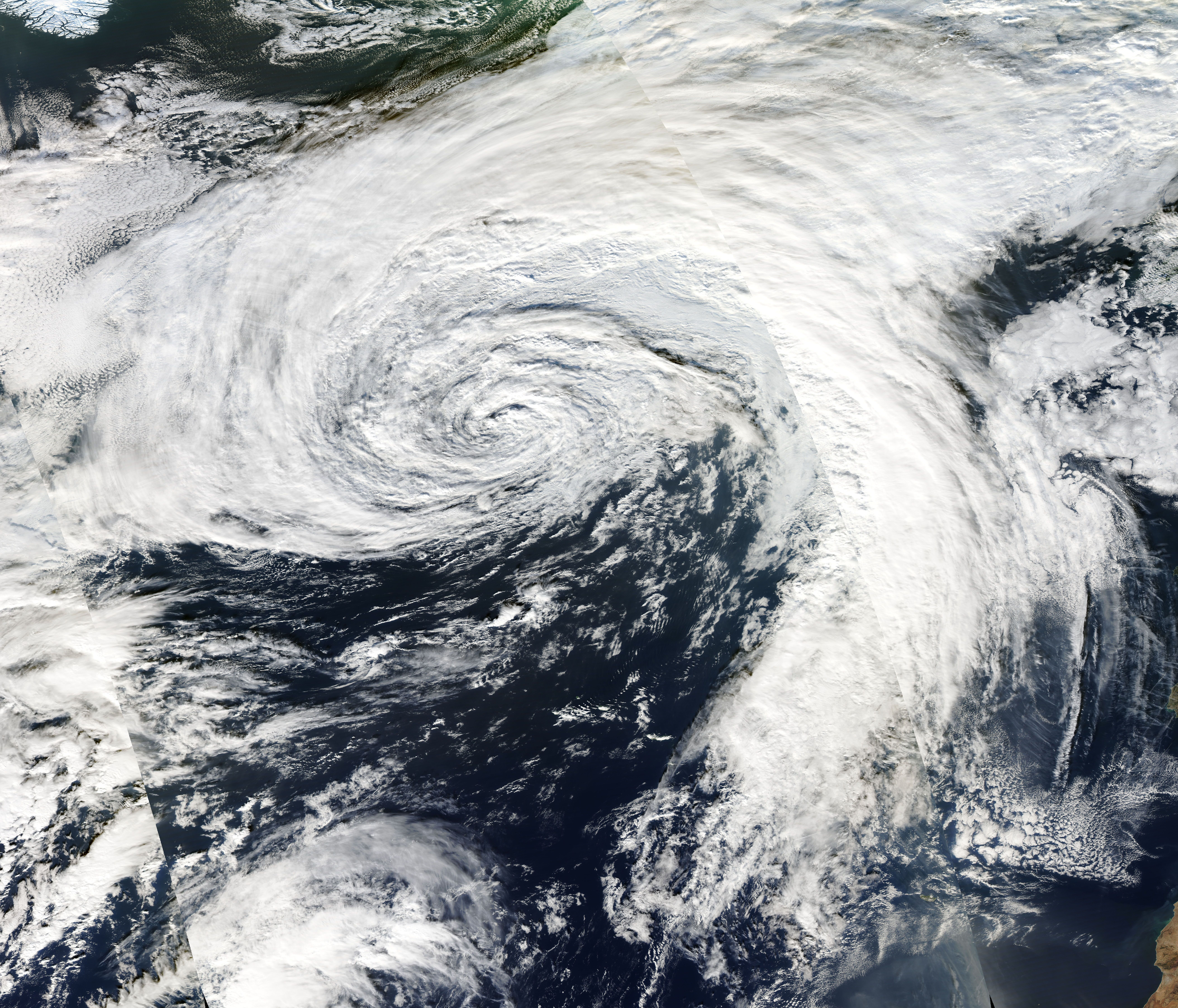
- Caroline approaching Britain and Ireland on 5 December
- Area affected: Ireland, Scotland, Faroe Islands, Norway
- Date of impact: 6–11 December
- Maximum wind gust: 150 km/h (93 mph; 81 kn) Fair Isle, United Kingdom
- Lowest pressure: 958 hPa (28.3 inHg)
- Fatalities: 1
- Power outages: Unspecified
- Damage: Minimal

The Met Office named storm Caroline on 5 December to affect Scotland on 7 December, with a yellow warning for wind, which was upgraded on 6 December to an amber warning for the Western Isles, Northern Isles and northern Scotland. Met Éireann issued a yellow warning for wind to the counties of Donegal, Galway, Leitrim, Mayo, Sligo, Clare and Kerry. In its wake, the storm delivered snowy and icy conditions to parts of England and Wales as the winds turned to the north as the system moved into Scandinavia on 8 December, accumulations of 11 cm were recorded on lower ground in Northern Ireland, with a few centimetres of snow in Wales and North-western England. Even with Caroline being located around Scandinavia, Caroline was still impacting the UK weather with a continuation of cold, Arctic air.

Seviri RGB Airmass view

=== Storm Ana ===
Ana
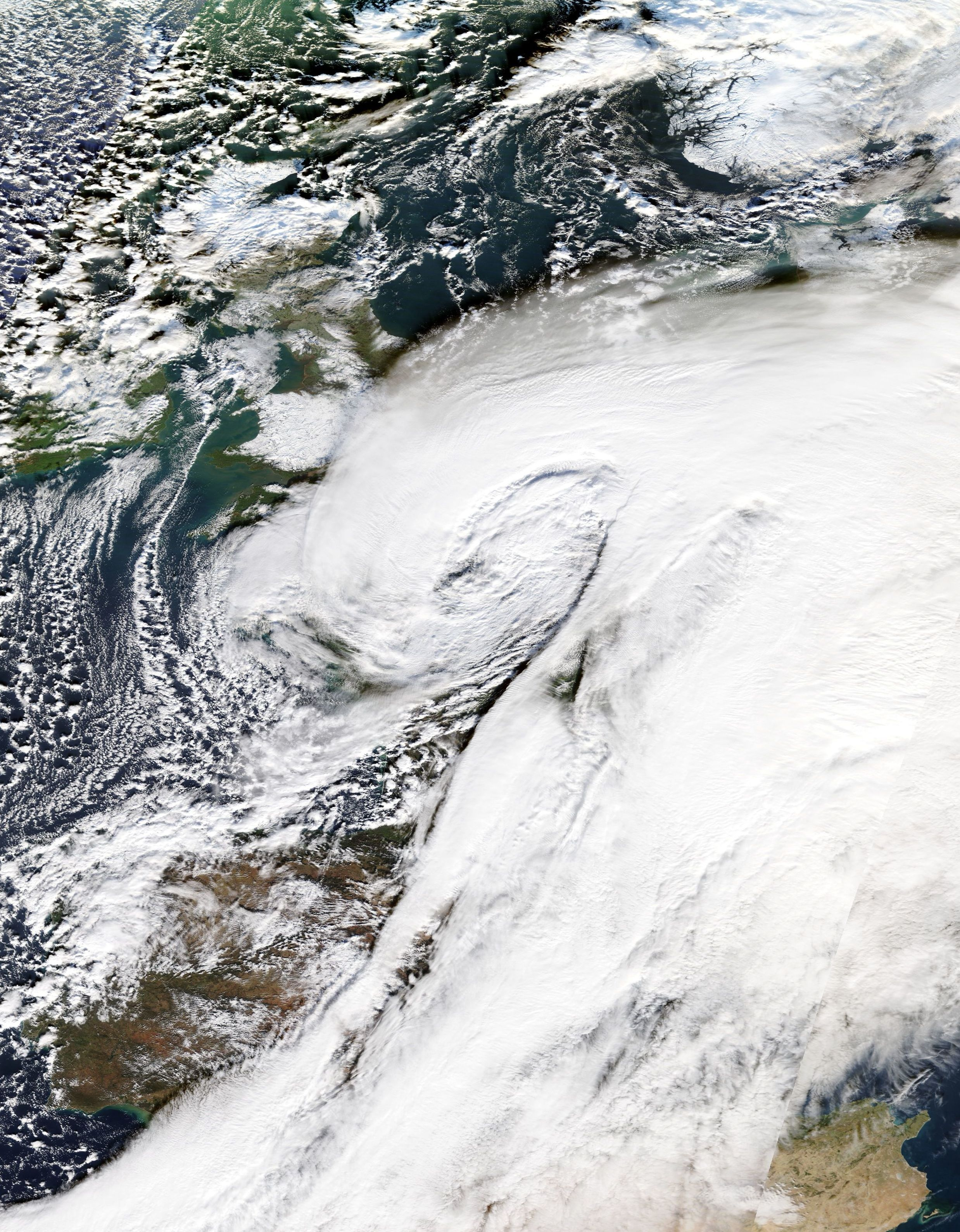
- Storm Ana over northwestern France
- Area affected: Portugal, Spain, France, Germany, Belgium, Netherlands, Austria, Switzerland, Italy, Scandinavia, Russia
- Date of impact: 10–16 December
- Maximum wind gust: 249 km/h (155 mph; 134 kn); Austrian Alps (11 December).
- Lowest pressure: 957 hPa (28.3 inHg)
- Fatalities: 1
- Power outages: Unspecified
- Damage: > £175 million (€200 million)

Storm Ana was the first storm to ever be officially named by Météo-France, Aemet and IPMA. It formed on 10 December as an area of low pressure that underwent explosive cyclogenesis^{[Note 1]} to the northwest of Iberia passing through the Bay of Biscay into France on the morning of 11 December. It then took a northeasterly direction to affect the Low Countries, Germany, Austria, Scandinavia and eventually Russia.

The highest gusts from Ana reached 249 km/h (155 mph; 134 kn) in the Austrian Alps, and its minimal pressure reached 957 hPa (28.3 inHg) on the morning of 11 December. Severe flooding was reported in the Emilia-Romagna region of northern Italy on 12 December, caused by heavy rainfall from a trailing front from Ana and rapid snowmelt due to a large temperature rise caused by Ana's passage. Damage from flooding in Italy reached €105 million.

=== Storm Bruno ===
Bruno
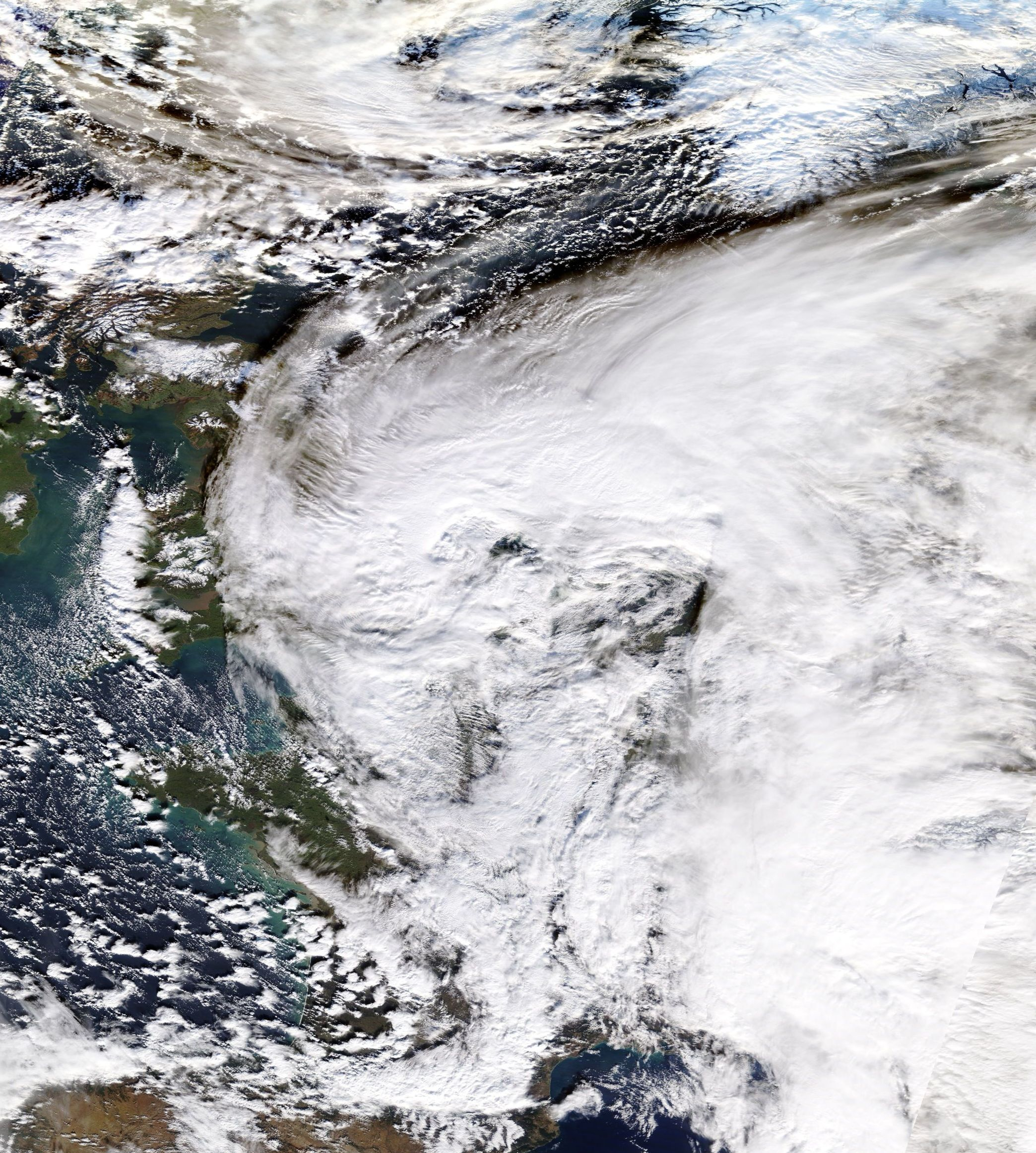
- Storm Bruno over the North Sea
- Area affected: Portugal, Spain, France
- Date of impact: 26–30 December
- Maximum wind gust: 154 km/h (96 mph; 83 kn)
- Lowest pressure: 976 hPa (28.8 inHg)
- Fatalities: 3
- Power outages: Unspecified
- Damage: > £60 million (€70 million)

On 26 December 2017, wind warnings were issued in Spain for an area of low pressure that was expected to undergo explosive cyclogenesis. Ultimately, Storm Bruno brought over 25 cm (9.8 in) of snow, wind gusts exceeding 100 km/h (62 mph; 54 kn), and waves as high as 8 m (26 ft) to Spain. One fatality occurred after a man drowned while windsurfing in rough seas. Another fatality occurred after a man was swept off his balcony by high winds and onto his patio, where he immediately succumbed to his injuries.

=== Storm Dylan ===
Dylan
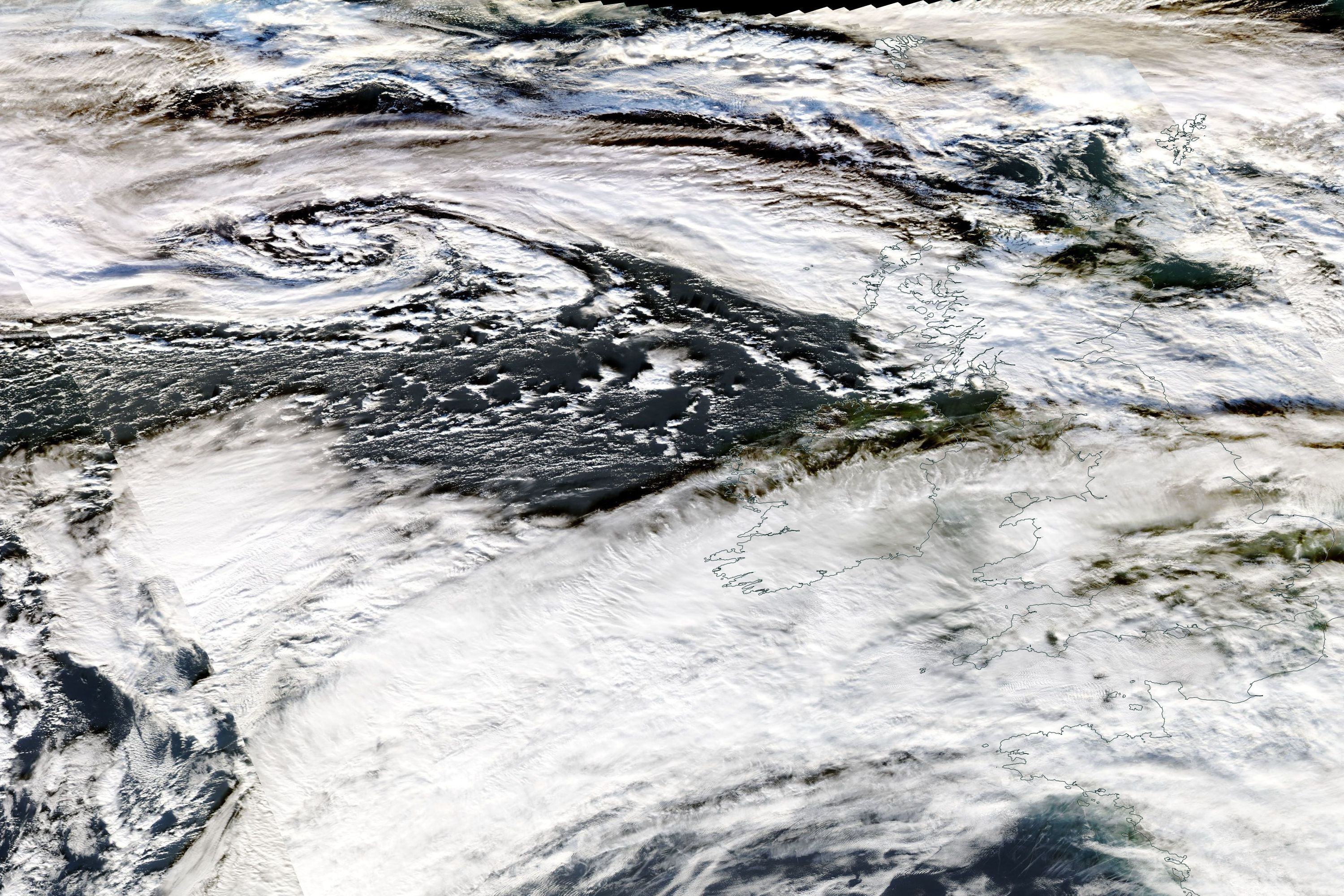
- Dylan approaching Britain and Ireland on 30 December 2017
- Area affected: Ireland, Northern Ireland
- Date of impact: 30 December–3 January
- Maximum wind gust: 124 km/h (77 mph; 67 kn)
- Lowest pressure: 966 hPa (28.5 inHg)
- Fatalities: 0
- Power outages: 7,500+
- Damage: Minimal

Storm Dylan affected the UK on New Year's Eve. This was the sixth storm of the 2017/2018 winter, and was a fairly typical Atlantic Storm, with winds gusting at 58 mph around exposed coastlines. There were reports of fallen trees across Northern Ireland, fallen trees in the south-west of England and some travel disruption. Snow and ice caused some travel disruption over the Pennines too. Weathermen were required to know which way the wind blew as many were forced to take shelter from the storm. As typical for Storm Dylan, a hard rain did indeed fall, buckets of it in fact, with many caught blowing in the wind, though never quite becoming a hurricane.

Satellite loop 30–31 December of storm Dylan/Horst from EUMETSAT.

=== Storm Carmen ===
Carmen
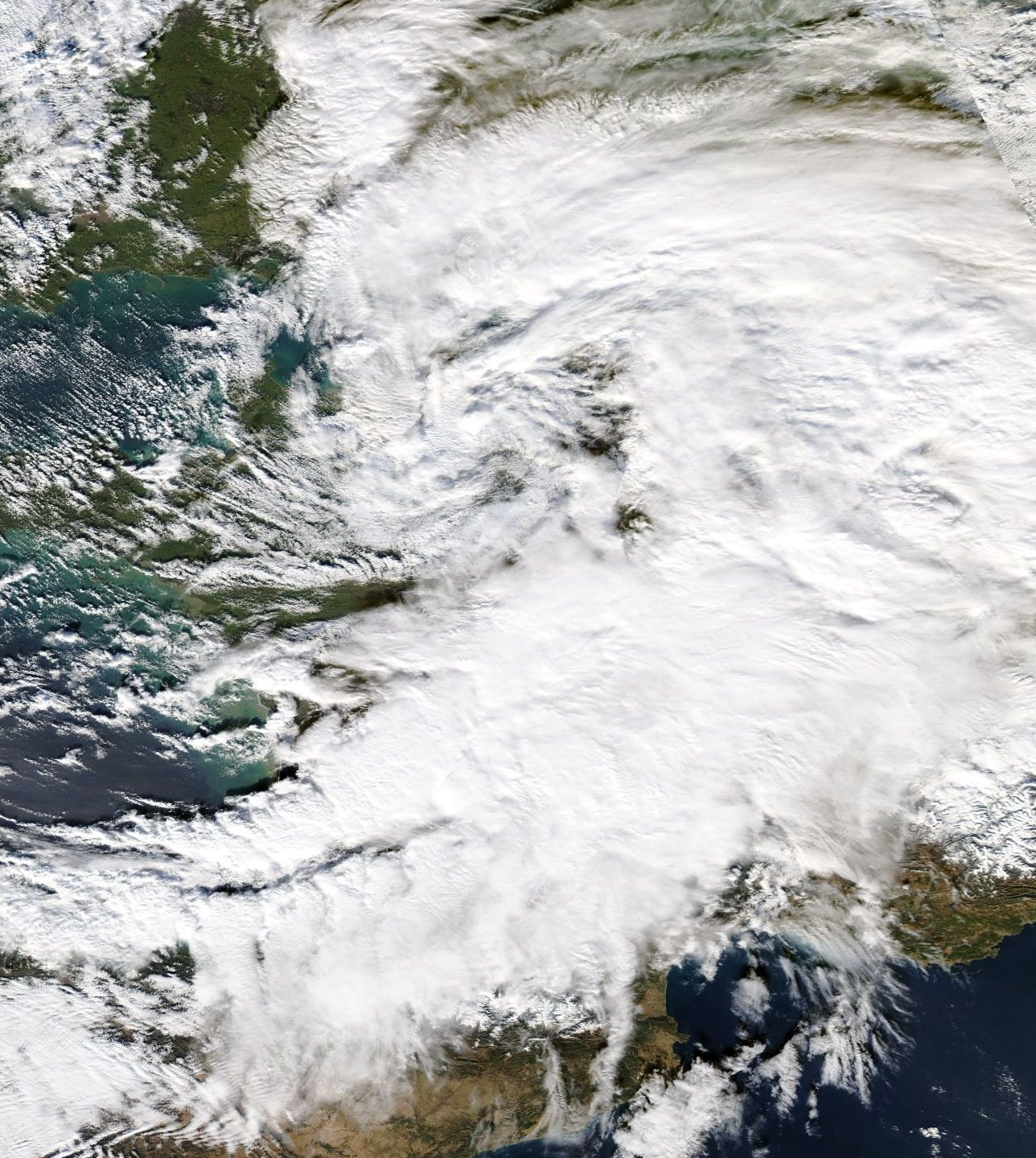
- Storm Carmen over northern France
- Area affected: France, Belgium
- Date of impact: 31 December–3 January
- Maximum wind gust: 161 km/h (100 mph; 87 kn), Mount Aigoual (alt 1,567 m [5,141 ft])
- Lowest pressure: 989 hPa (29.2 inHg)
- Fatalities: 1
- Power outages: 65,000+
- Damage: > £800 million (€900 million)

Storm Carmen began as an area of low pressure in late December 2017. The storm went under some intensification before affecting France and other western European countries with strong winds. A man was killed by Carmen as a tree had fallen on his car during new year celebrations, and a 60-metre-tall (200 ft) wind turbine was blown over in the western Vendée region due to extreme winds.

=== Storm Eleanor ===
Eleanor
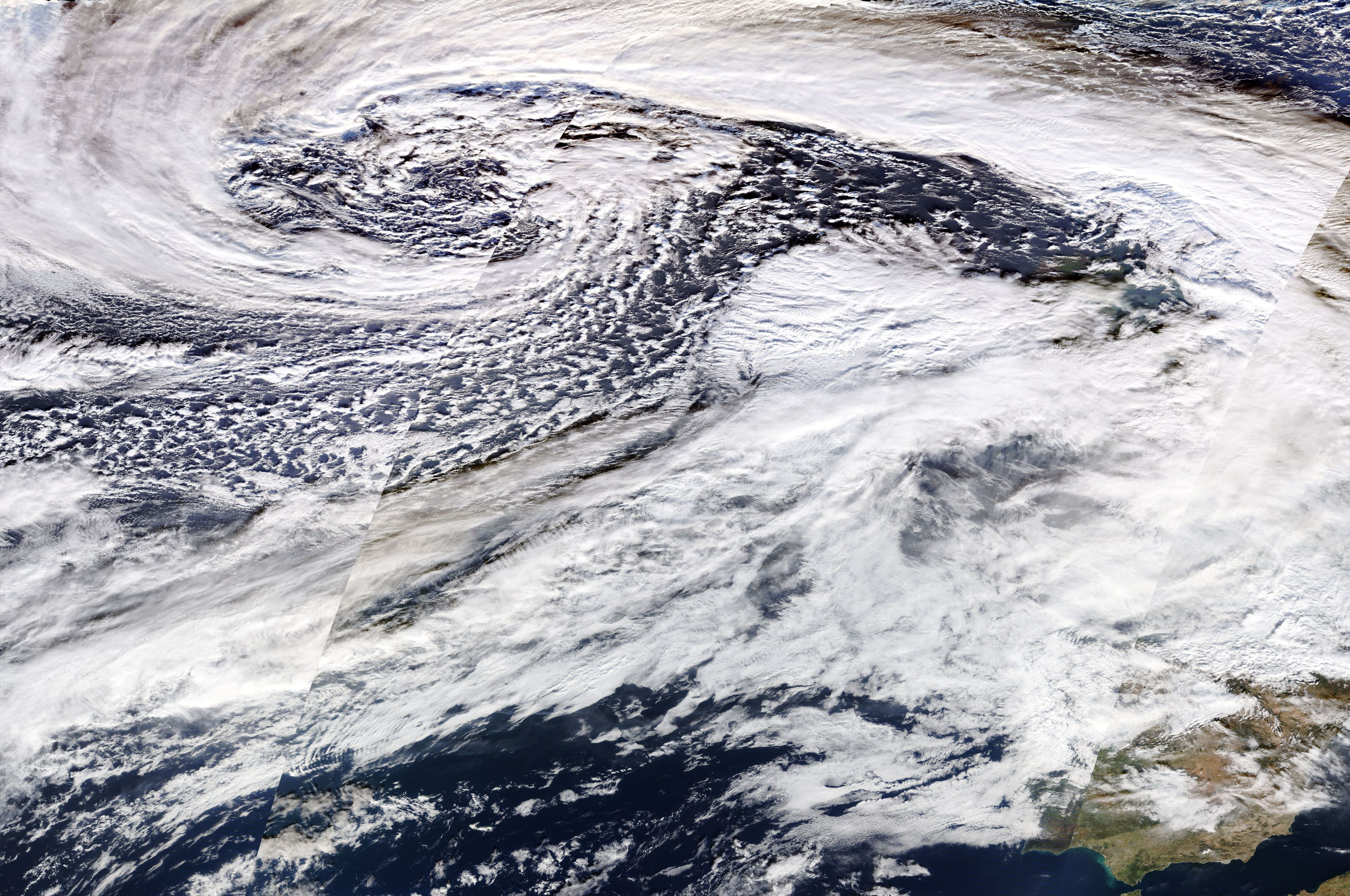
- Eleanor approaching Britain and Ireland on 2 January 2018
- Area affected: Ireland, Great Britain, Belgium, France, Germany, Netherlands and Switzerland
- Date of impact: 2–5 January
- Maximum wind gust: 226 km/h (140 mph; 122 kn), Goldau
- Lowest pressure: 966 hPa (28.5 inHg)
- Fatalities: 7
- Power outages: 150,000+
- Damage: > £850 million (€1 billion)

Named by Met Éireann on 1 January with Amber Wind Warning in force for 2 January. Forecast to bring gusts of 110–130 km/h (68–81 mph; 59–70 kn) into the evening. The Met Office also issued a Yellow Wind Warning for 2–3 January, only to upgrade it to an amber warning across Northern England and Southern Scotland 3 hours prior making landfall in the UK.

Satellite loop of Eleanor from EUMETSAT.

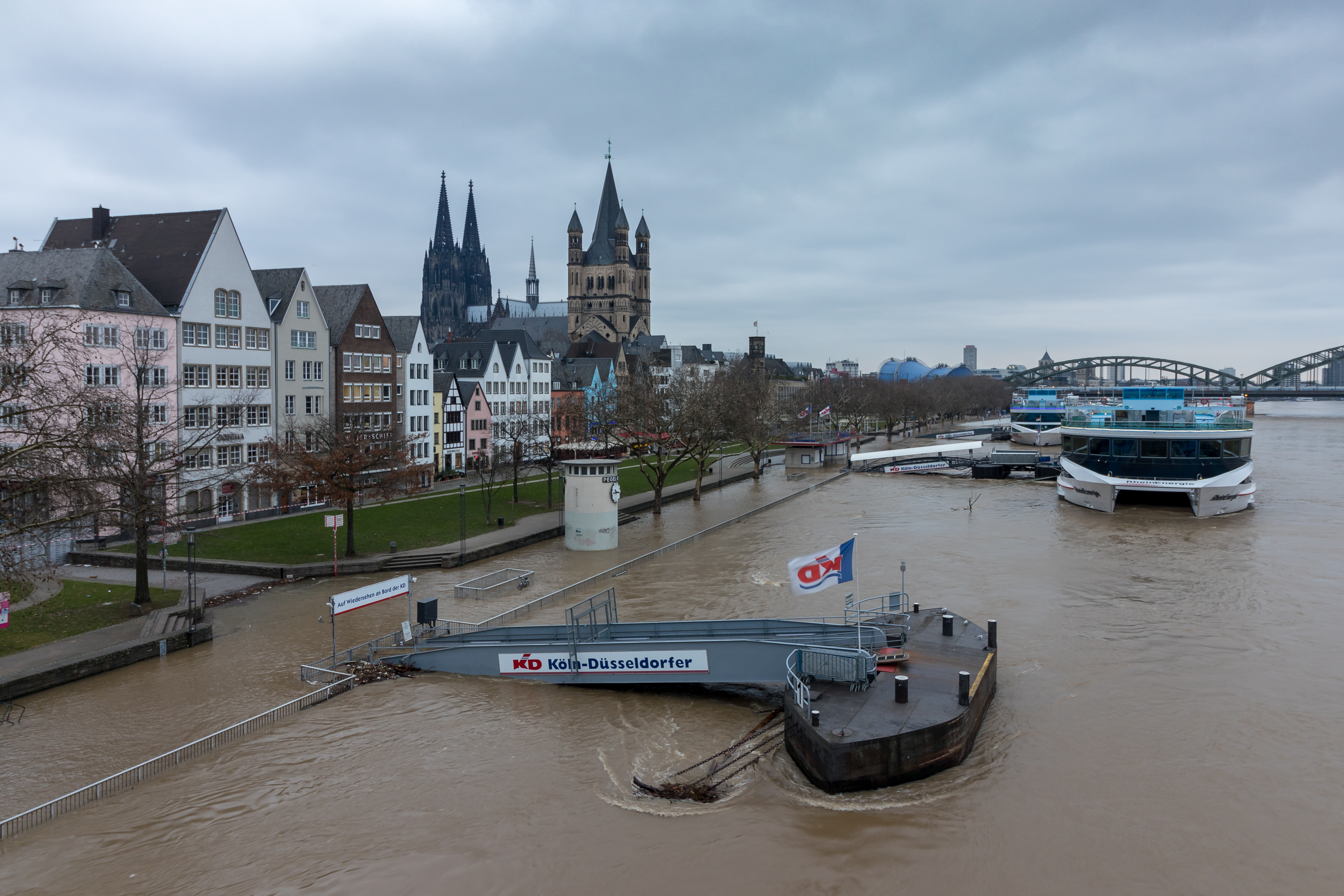
Floods in river Rhine after the storm (Burglind), 8 January in Cologne (Germany)

As Eleanor neared Ireland, it brought heavy rainfall and squally weather followed by very strong gusts of 156 km/h (97 mph; 84 kn) in Knock Airport in Republic of Ireland. As Eleanor tracked further North-east she continued to strengthen as a sting-jet like feature was evident, however, it did not form. Eleanor also produced thunderstorms and intense hail across England and Wales. The worst damage happened in Northern Ireland.

According to the UK Met Office, gusts reached 90 mph (140 km/h; 78 kn) in Orlock Head, while a mountain weather station in Great Dun Fell recorded 100 mph (160 km/h; 87 kn) gusts.

=== Storm Fionn ===
Fionn
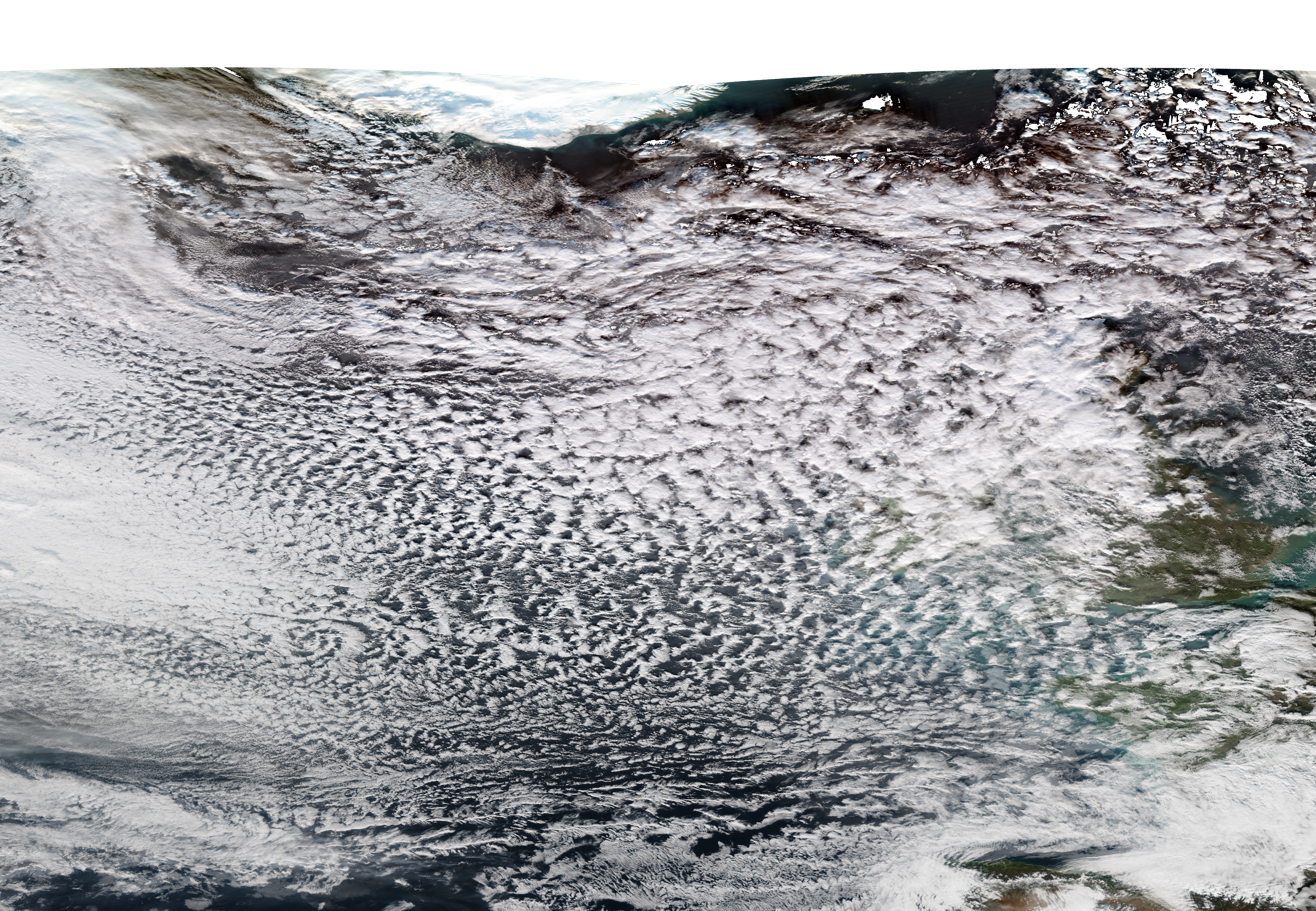
- Storm Fionn west of Ireland on 16 January
- Area affected: Ireland, Iceland, Greenland, United Kingdom, France, Central Europe
- Date of impact: 14–21 January
- Maximum wind gust: 237 km/h (147 mph; 128 kn) (Botnsheidi, Iceland)
- Lowest pressure: 935 hPa (27.6 inHg) ^{[Note 1]}
- Fatalities: 0
- Power outages: Unspecified
- Damage: Minimal

On 16 January Met Éireann issued orange marine weather warnings for wind to storm force from Roches Point to Slyne Head to Malin Head, along with orange national weather warnings for Donegal, Galway, Leitrim, Mayo, Sligo, Clare, Cork and Kerry for 16–17 January, so naming storm Fionn. This system, also called Evi by the FUB, was meteorologically speaking a very deep and large Icelandic low that bottomed out at a central pressure of 935 hPa (27.6 inHg) and dominated the weather in the North Atlantic and Northern Europe for several days in the middle of January 2018. This low had a large and intense wind field on its southern flank, fuelling a strong jetstream that steered the less deep but much more catastrophic Cyclone David into the UK and Ireland and Central Europe on 18 January. After the arrival of David, Fionn weakened and David became the more dominant low, leading to the decay and dissipation of Fionn.

Synoptic chart of Fionn (as a "squeeze in isobars") 16–17 January preceding the low (David/Friederike) moving towards Ireland visible on the last two frames from KNMI

As Fionn neared Ireland, it brought heavy winds to Donegal, Sligo, Mayo, Clare, Leitrim and Cork.

On 16 January the Met Office sent out a clarifying tweet that Fionn was only expected to bring strong winds to western Ireland, with impacts to the UK to be expected to be below their warning thresholds. In the tweet they pointed to a separate weather system to affect the UK on 17–18 January, later named David by MeteoFrance, this name was reciprocally adopted by the Met Office and Met Eireann. The low David was named Friederike by the Free University of Berlin, with the name Georgina at that time remaining unused.

Met Éireann's decision to name Fionn was met with some criticism from some meteorologists, Liam Dutton tweeted that he thought the warning did not strictly accompany a cyclonic area of low pressure, but a "squeeze of isobars" circulating a low hundreds of kilometres (miles) distant in the region of the Faroes, stating that it "needed no more than a standard weather warning". He highlighted the difference in criteria for naming storms employed by the Met Office and Met Éireann (the UK Met Office uses an impact-based criteria, based on the level of expected impacts the weather will bring, whereas the Irish Met Éireann uses fixed numerical criteria, meaning a storm will be named when mean wind speeds are likely to occur, between 65 and 80 km/h [40 and 50 mph; 35 and 43 kn] and/or gusts between 110 and 130 km/h [68 and 81 mph; 59 and 70 kn]).

Evelyn Cusack of Met Éireann said that she understood Dutton's point, stating that his criticisms were well made. She reiterated that the orange warning issued by Met Éireann fulfilled their criteria for naming the storm, producing severe winds, coastal flooding and high waves on the Irish coast, even if the centre of circulation was distant.

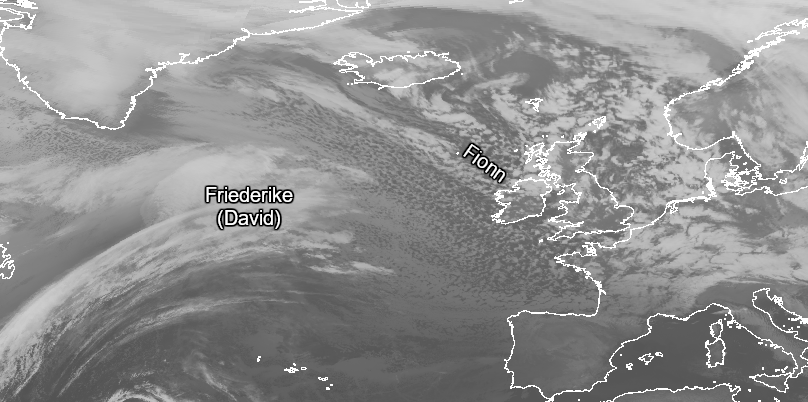
Relative locations of storms Fionn, and Friederike (David).

Low pressure centre of Fionn moves close to Iceland 1800 UTC 16 January 2018– 0300 UTC 17 January 2018, bringing high winds to western Ireland.

=== Storm David/Friederike ===
David (FRA), Friederike (GER)
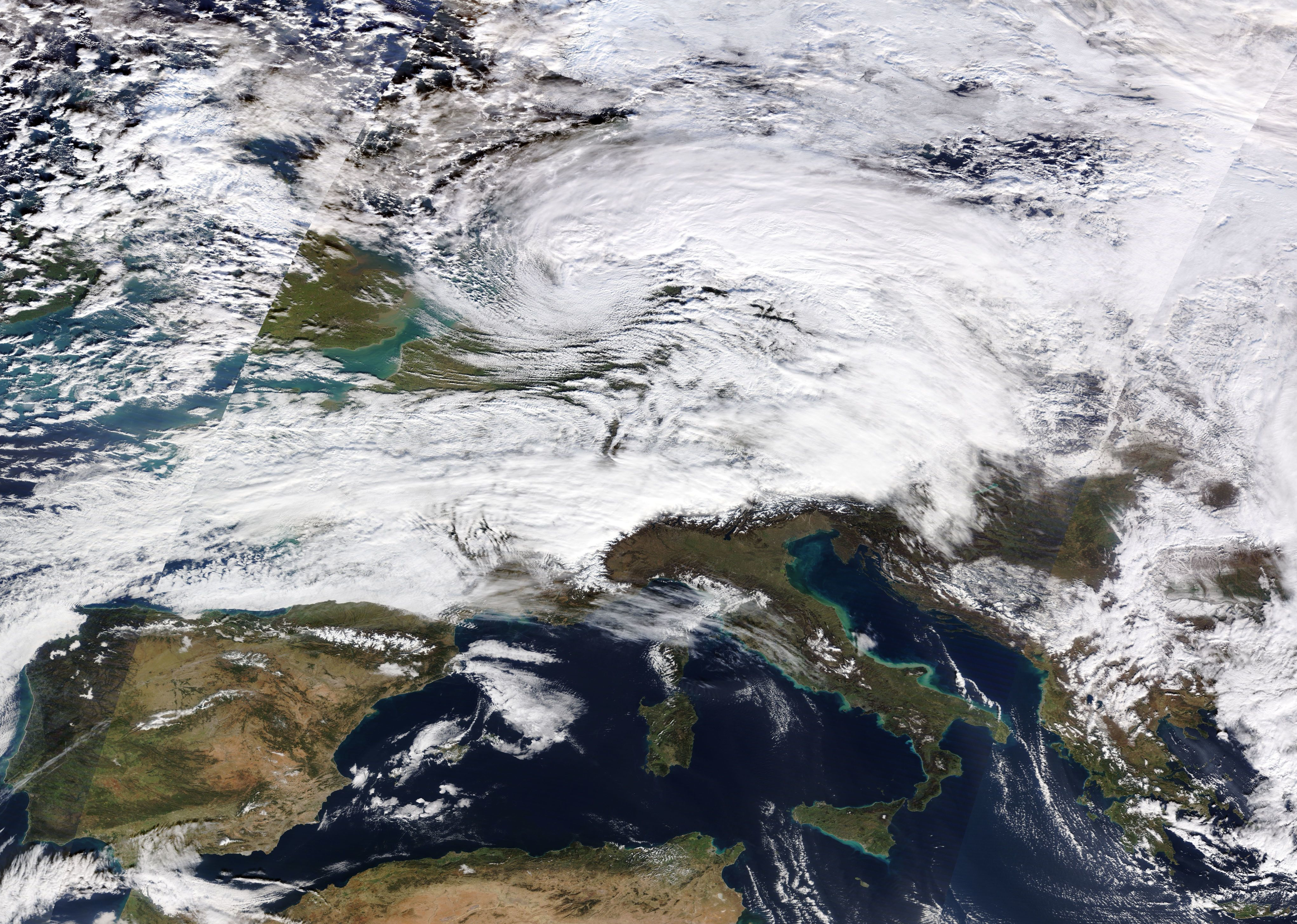
- David on 18 January, centred over Benelux or Western Germany
- Area affected: Britain, Ireland, France, Benelux, Central Europe, Italy, Eastern Europe
- Date of impact: 17–21 January
- Maximum wind gust: 203 km/h (126 mph; 110 kn), Brocken, Saxony-Anhalt (at altitude); 150 km/h (93 mph; 81 kn), Capel Curig, Wales (alt 216 m [709 ft])
- Lowest pressure: 974 hPa (28.8 inHg)
- Fatalities: 13
- Power outages: 471,000+
- Damage: > £3.5 billion (€4.2 billion)

Storm David (also named Friederike), affected an area of Europe from northern France and England, through the Netherlands, Belgium, Germany and the Alps to Poland and the Czech Republic, starting on the evening of 17 January until 19 January. David brought heavy snowfall on its northern flank and high winds (sustained winds up to Bft. 11, widespread hurricane-force gusts) on its southern flank. In some locations, both the high winds and the snowfall occurred, creating blizzard conditions. Amsterdam Airport Schiphol was closed, as well as some airports in Germany. European railroad companies (e.g. the Deutsche Bahn in Germany) could only offer very limited transportation services, if any. Road traffic was similarly disrupted by windthrow, snow, ice, high crosswinds, and by traffic jams that were caused by incidents related to the storm. Widespread damage to manmade structures and to forests occurred. Germany was the worst-hit country as there were 10 known deaths as well as a damage total as high as several hundreds of millions. David/Friederike was the most devastating windstorm in Germany after Cyclone Kyrill in 2007. Coincidentally, Friederike and Kyrill both struck Central Europe on 18 January, albeit 11 years apart.

This storm, which proved to have catastrophic effects, originated from a low pressure trough in the Western Atlantic that stretched from the Southern Caribbean to Newfoundland on 14 January — 16. After gaining a closed circulation near or over Newfoundland on 16 January, the new cyclone entered the very strong southern wind field of the Icelandic Low Fionn, crossing the Atlantic in less than two days and being steered into Europe. Upon the formation of the precursor trough, the GFS and ECMWF correctly predicted that system to impact Europe as a windstorm. Between 14 and 19 January, the binary storm complex that consisted of Fionn and David brought high winds and snowfall to large portions of Europe. After the storms have passed, they left behind an improved weather situation in Europe that was calmer, drier and warmer.

The storm also brought some hurricane-force gusts and heavy snowfall to Britain and Ireland and caused 140,000 power cuts there. Nevertheless, the storm impacted the Netherlands and Germany in a much more dramatic way. The UK Met Office did not give David a name from its own storm naming list as it did not expect the storm to have a significant impact on Britain, which proved to be an underestimation.

=== Storm Georgina ===
Georgina
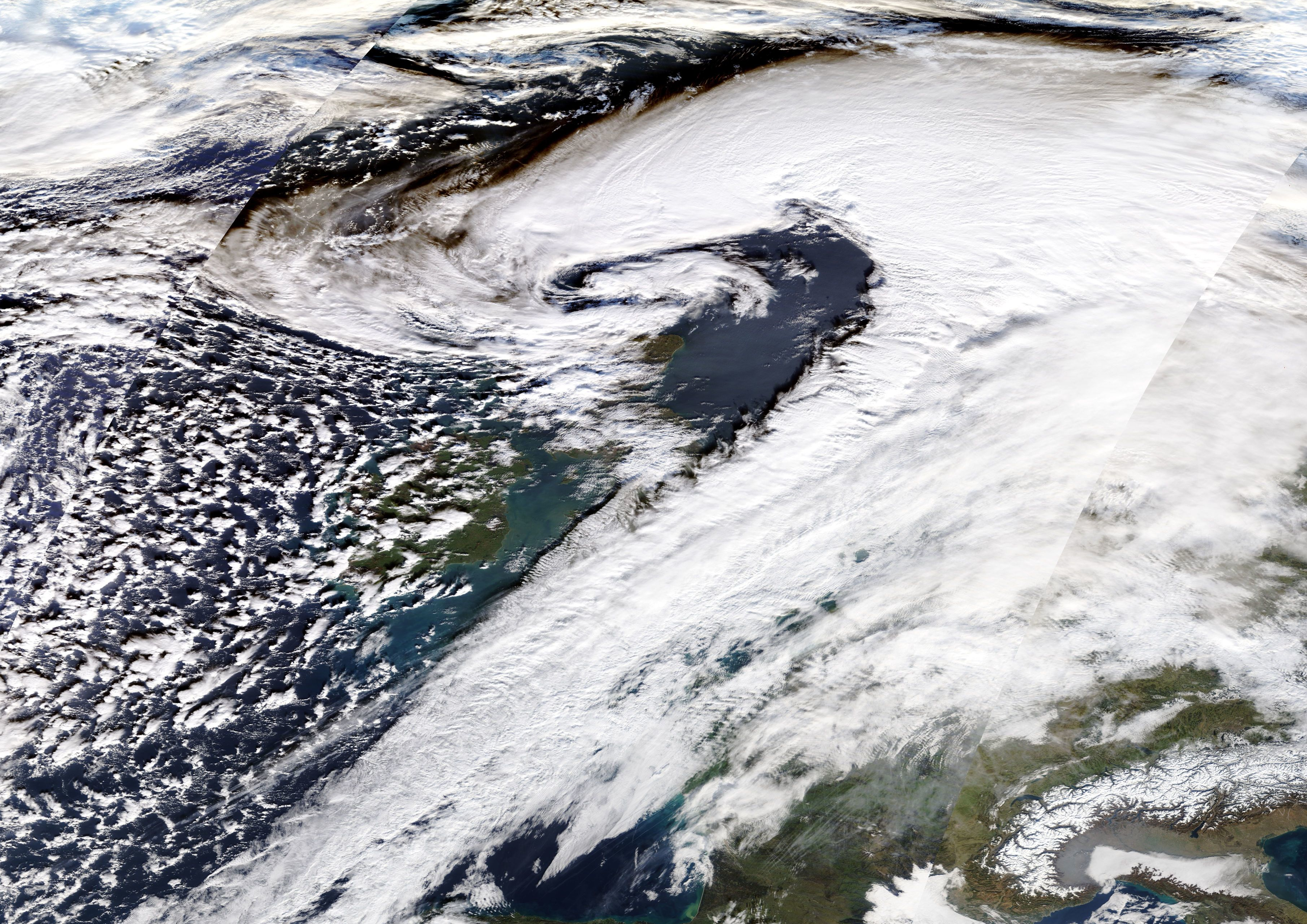
- Excellently well-defined low pressure centre of Georgina passing just north of Scotland
- Area affected: Ireland, Northern Ireland, Scotland, Norway
- Date of impact: 23–27 January
- Maximum wind gust: 225 km/h (140 mph; 121 kn), Glencoe Ski area, United Kingdom
- Lowest pressure: 959 hPa (28.3 inHg)
- Fatalities: 0
- Power outages: Unspecified
- Damage: Minimal

Georgina was a fairly typical winter storm with maximum gust speeds of 60 to 70 mph around exposed coastlines, but gusts approached 60 mph inlands across parts of England and Wales.The strongest winds were near the centre of the low across northern Scotland, with the highest gust of 85 mph at South Uist, Western Isles. Winds gusted close to 115 mph across the tops of the Scottish mountains and here there were very challenging conditions with snow at high levels adding to already very significant accumulations for the winter so far. The storm hampered the search for a missing hillwalker on Ben Nevis who had previously fallen through a cornice.

=== Storm Emma ===
Emma (POR), Ulrike (GER)
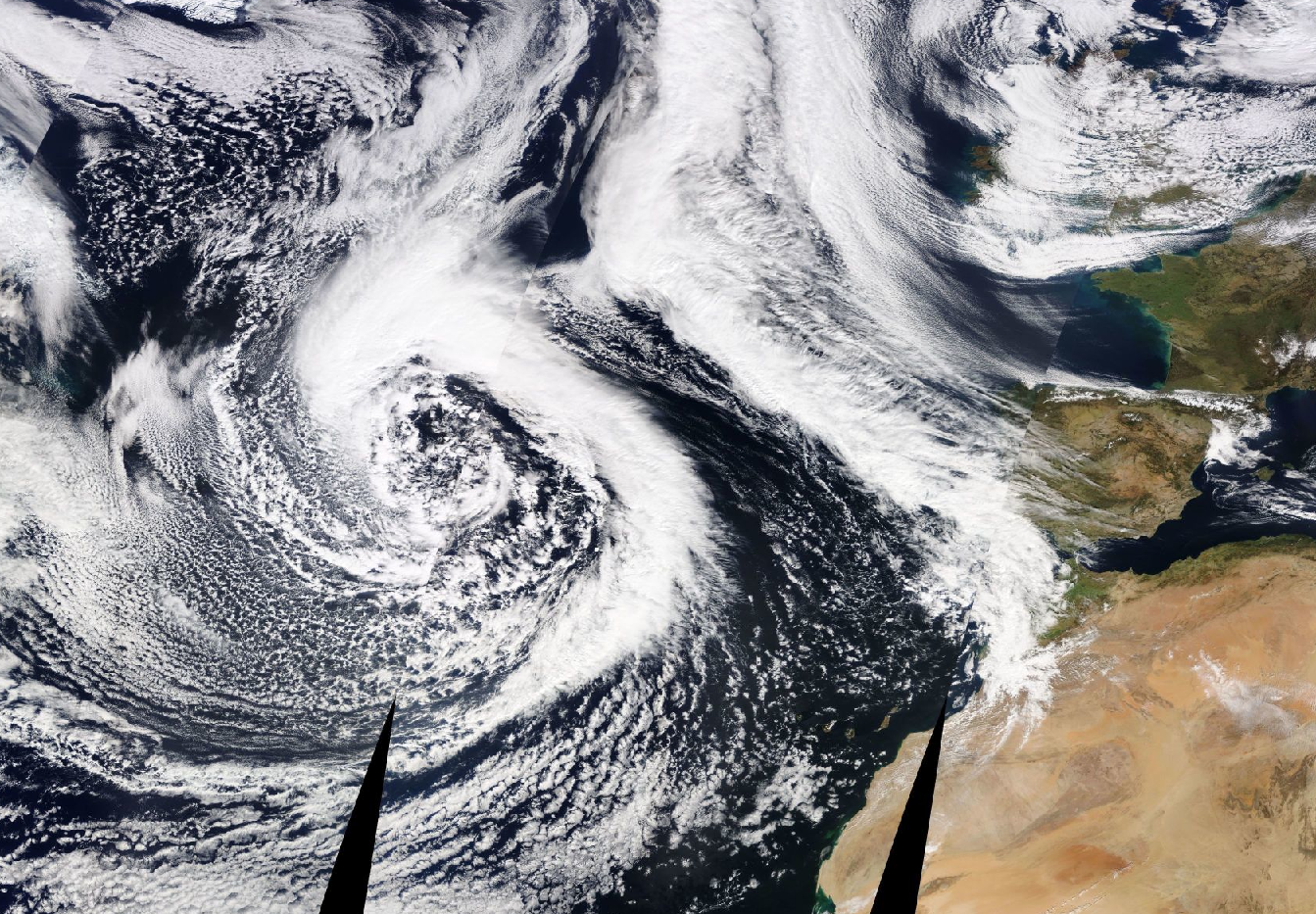
- Emma, an extensive cyclone and potential blizzard, on 26 February while being centred near the Azores and threatening Portugal
- Area affected: Azores, Madeira, Canary Islands, Morocco, Portugal, Spain, France, Great Britain and Ireland
- Date of impact: 26 February–7 March
- Maximum wind gust: 228 km/h (142 mph; 123 kn), Mont Aigoual, France (alt 1,567 m [5,141 ft])^{[Note 2]}
- Lowest pressure: 963 hPa (28.4 inHg)
- Fatalities: 95
- Power outages: Unspecified
- Damage: > £1.8 billion (€2.1 billion)

Storm Emma (also named Ulrike) was named while it was centred over the Azores and threatened to strike Western Europe as a blizzard. The cyclone affected Iberia, Great Britain and Ireland on its track, causing high winds and snowfall, leading to blizzard conditions.

As Emma neared southwest England, it brought new cold air to the UK and Ireland, prolonging the cold period. Meteorologists observed the collision of Emma and Anticyclone Hartmut dubbed the Beast from the East by the press, and the interaction of the two highly different air masses worsened the wind and snowfall posed by Emma. Starting on 1 March 2018, the collision of Emma and Hartmut triggered numerous hurricane-force gusts in southern Europe and the United Kingdom. The highest of these gusts occurred in the morning of 1 March on Mount Aigoual in southern France at 228 km/h (142 mph; 123 kn).

On 1 March 2018, UK authorities issued a red warning in Wales and south-west England as citizens in Scotland spent up to 20 hours in their cars stuck in traffic in frigid weather and a 46-year-old Southampton man died in a motor vehicle accident on the A34. Schools across the UK were closed in the face of oncoming blizzards, strong winds, and heavy snowfall. Traffic was significantly hindered by the Beast from the East. In Lincolnshire commuters near Boston were stranded by snow and had to freed by farmers with tractors, a minimum of 20 cars and HGVs were snowed in on the A46 close to Faldingworth. The Royal Air Force deployed 4×4 vehicles to transport health and emergency workers. Trains were cancelled across the UK, with over 20 rail operators running at reduced capacity; London's Paddington Station closed for about three hours and 50 stations in Kent closed because of inclement weather. Air travel has been similarly curtailed, as terminals all over the country cancel flights. At least three people died in the UK as a result of the storm.

In Ireland snow began to fall in the east of the country on Tuesday 27 February. Snow continued in the east on Wednesday the 28th, with well over 15 cm (5.9 in) reported in many areas. Schools closed on Wednesday the 28th in affected areas. Panic buying of food was seen as Storm Emma approached. Emma made landfall on the south coast on Thursday 1 March and swept northward. All schools were closed on Thursday 1 March and Friday the 2nd nationwide with a red weather warning put in place by Met Eireann. High winds and heavy snowfall on top of the already lying snow led to drifting and severe disruption. Many roads were left impassable, particularly in rural areas and in North Kildare, West Wicklow and Wexford respectively. Power outages and water cuts were reported widely. A Lidl supermarket was torn down and looted in Fortunestown, Tallaght during the chaos caused by the storm. Over 50 cm (20 in) of lying snow was reported in some locations, with drifts many feet high on many rural routes. Some rural villages were cut off for many days. A slow thaw ensued. Many schools remained closed in Kildare, Wicklow and Wexford on Monday 5 March as local authorities continued to attempt to clear roads.

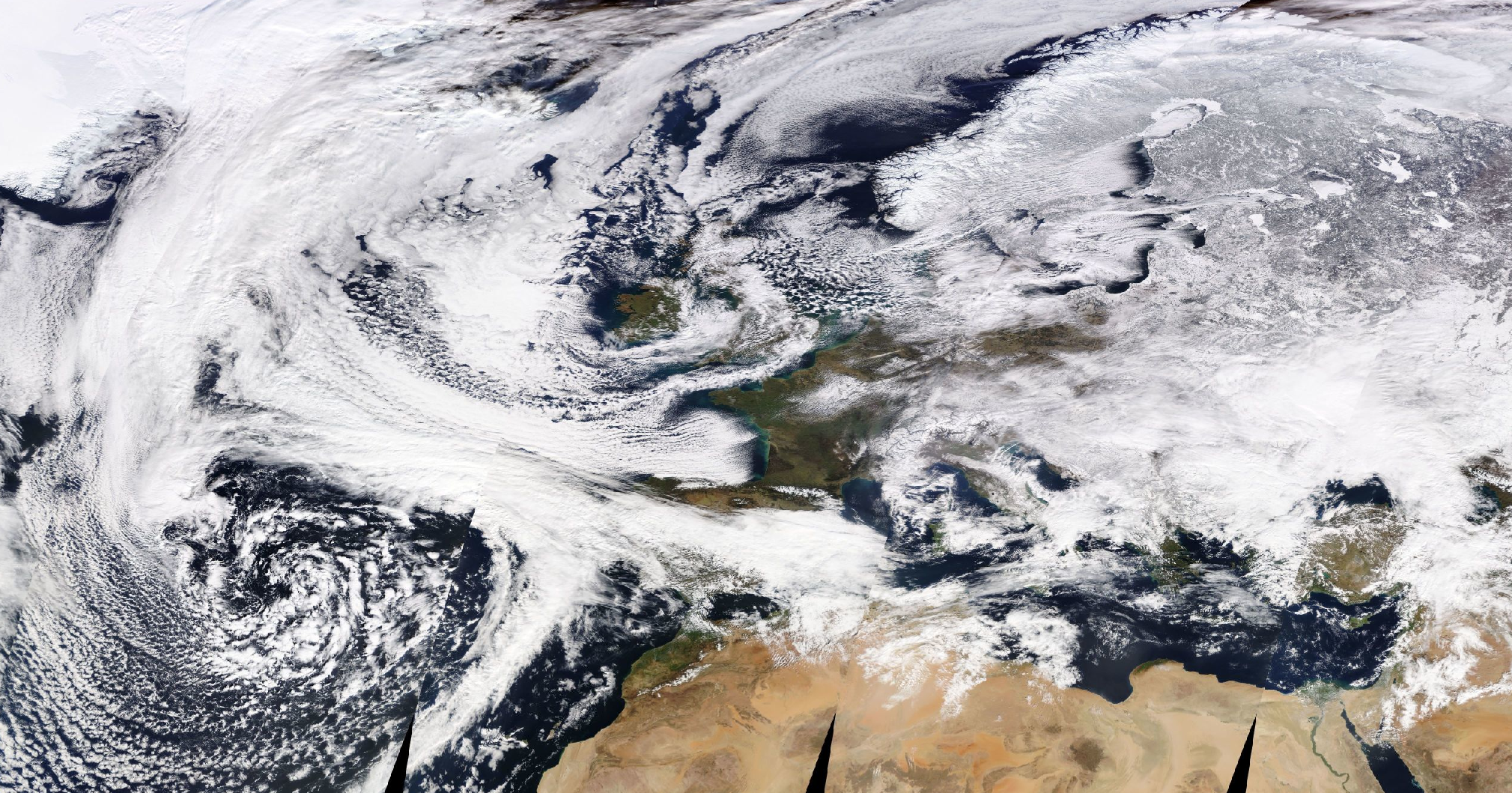
Satellite view showing the beginning interaction of Cyclone Emma nearing from the Southwest and Anticyclone Hartmut (Beast from the East cold wave) covering Europe from the Northeast on 27 February. As the collision of the systems continued, Emma's structure became much more distorted on 28 February. In early March, several gusts higher than 200 km/h (120 mph; 110 kn) occurred in the collision zone that was in Spain and France; Likewise, Britain received some gusts higher than 150 km/h (93 mph; 81 kn).

=== Storm Felix ===
Felix
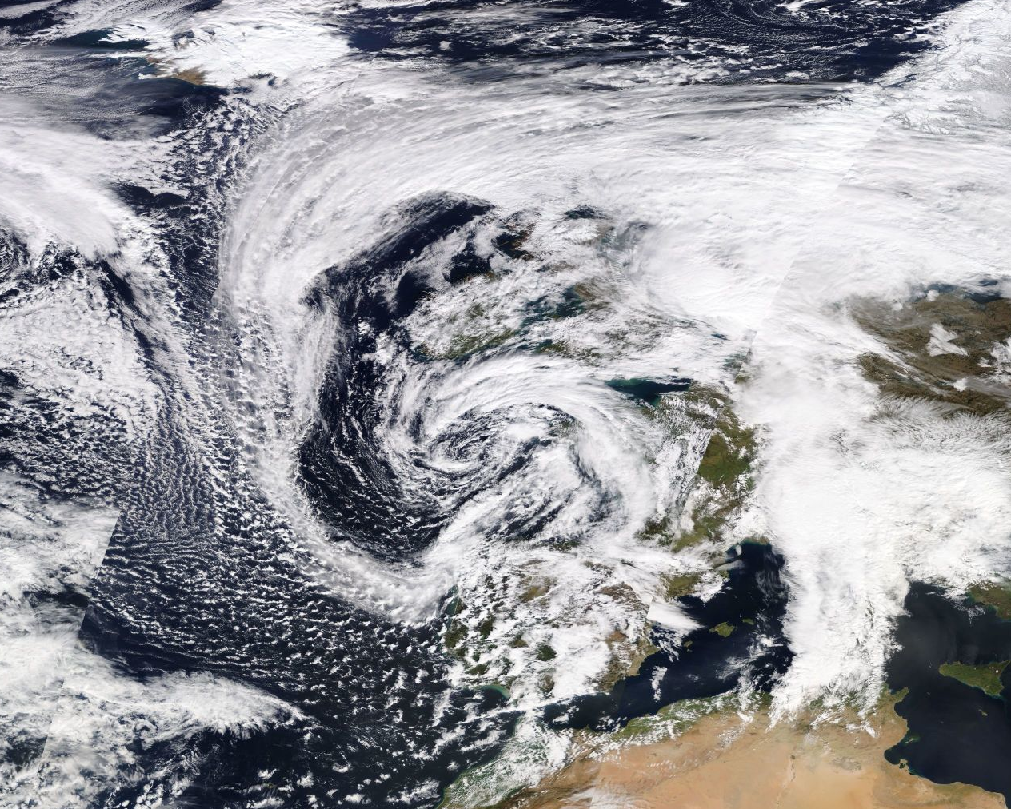
- Felix in the Bay of Biscay on 11 March
- Area affected: Azores, Madeira, Canary Islands, Portugal, Spain, France
- Date of impact: 9–16 March
- Maximum wind gust: 150 km/h (93 mph; 81 kn), Madeira, Portugal
- Lowest pressure: 967 hPa (28.6 inHg)
- Fatalities: 0
- Power outages: Unspecified
- Damage: > £7.5 million (€9 million)

Storm Felix formed from the remnants of the nor'easter which affected the eastern United States in early March 2018. After moving out into the Atlantic, the low-pressure system which caused the nor'easter quickly deepened to a minimum pressure of 967 hPa (28.6 inHg). Felix was subsequently named by IPMA of Portugal on 9 March, as orange weather warnings were issued for Madeira and surrounding islands. Winds gusting up to 150 km/h (93 mph; 81 kn) were recorded in the mountains of Madeira and up to 120 km/h (75 mph; 65 kn) at Madeira Airport.

Felix subsequently approached mainland Portugal, where red wind warnings were issued along the central coast and winds reaching 100 km/h (62 mph; 54 kn) were observed. Red warnings were also issued ahead of the storm in northern Spain, as Felix veered northwards into the Bay of Biscay. Felix weakened as it moved further east, making landfall in central France as a minimal storm.

=== Storm Gisele ===
Gisele
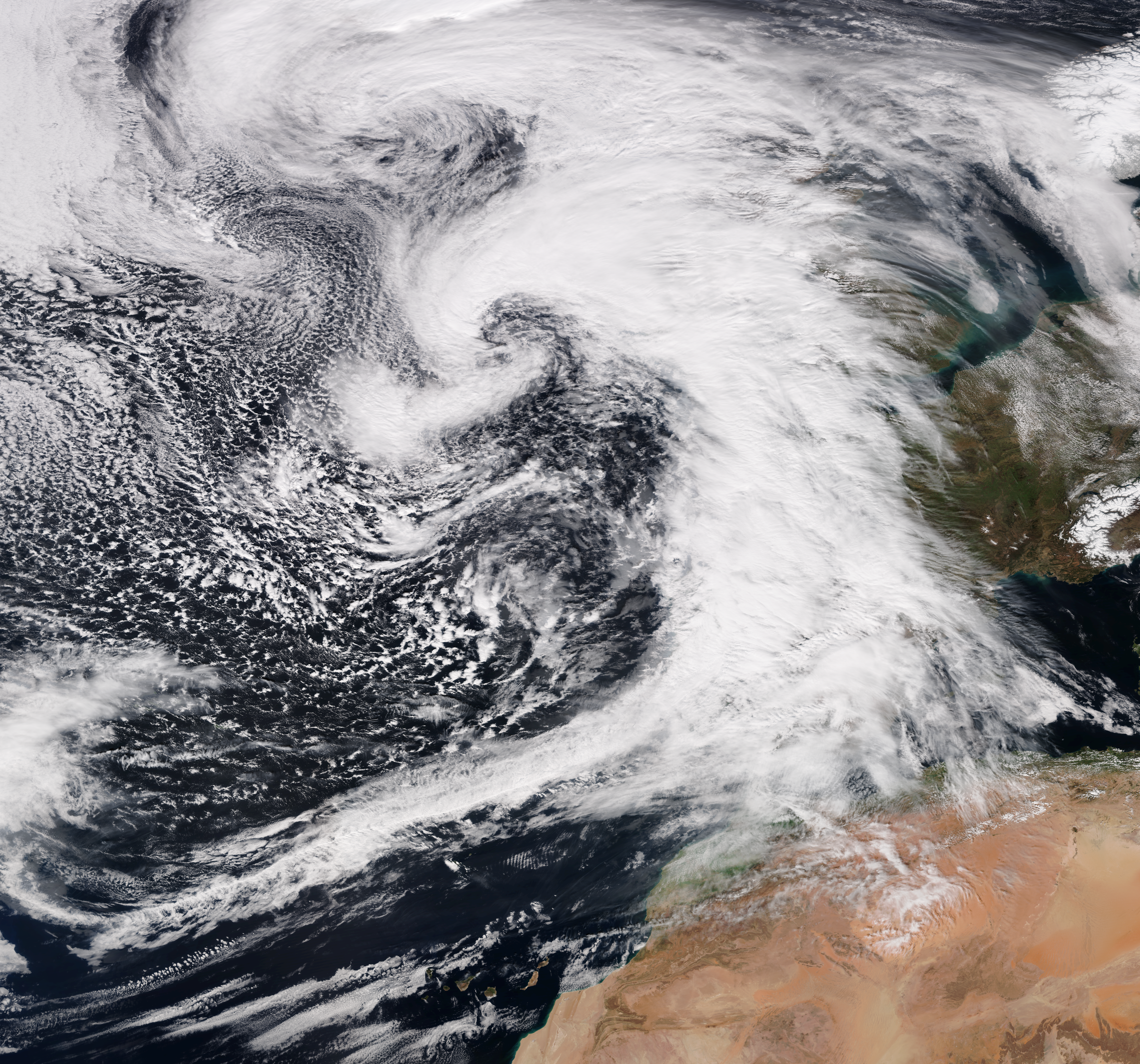
- Gisele on 14 March
- Area affected: Azores, mainland Portugal, Spain
- Date of impact: 14–18 March
- Maximum wind gust: 110 km/h (68 mph; 59 kn)
- Lowest pressure: 968 hPa (28.6 inHg)
- Fatalities: 0
- Power outages: Unspecified
- Damage: > £7.5 million (€9 million)

Storm Gisele was named by the Spanish AEMET agency on 14 March, as the system was undergoing rapid intensification in the central Atlantic. Around the same time, IPMA in Portugal issued orange wind warnings for the Azores archipelago as Gisele approached. Across the islands, winds of up to 100 km/h (62 mph; 54 kn) were recorded. Gisele subsequently continued northeastwards; orange wind warnings were issued for mainland Portugal and northern Spain, warning of wind impacts and coastal damage. Gisele then made landfall in mainland Portugal, with mesovortices within an unstable cold front bringing isolated gusts of up to 110 km/h (68 mph; 59 kn) and at least one confirmed tornado.

=== Storm Hugo ===
Hugo
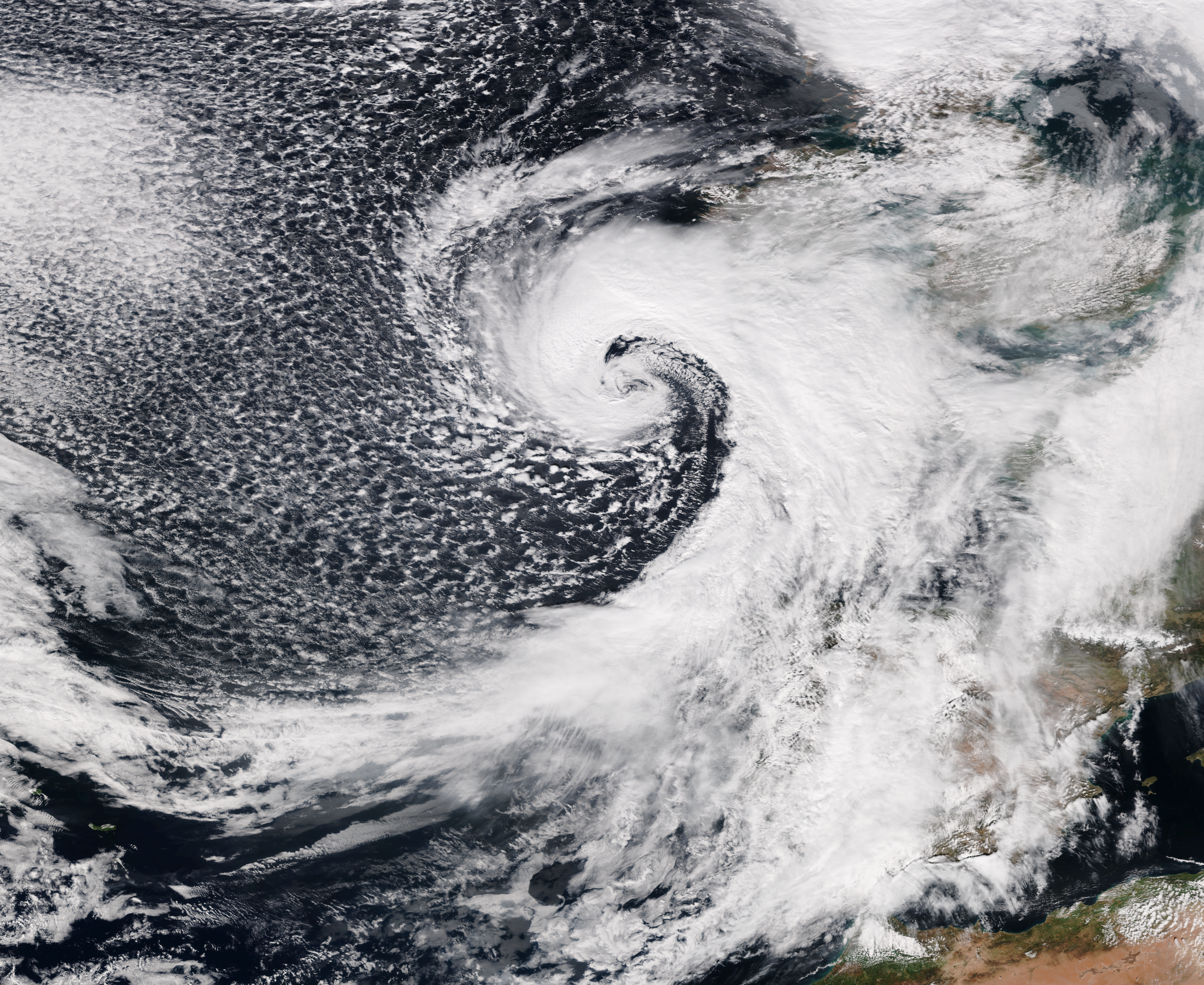
- Hugo on 23 March
- Area affected: Portugal
- Date of impact: 23–29 March
- Maximum wind gust: 120 km/h (75 mph; 65 kn)
- Lowest pressure: 971 hPa (28.7 inHg)
- Fatalities: 0
- Power outages: Unspecified
- Damage: Minimal

Storm Hugo was named by AEMET on 23 March, as it was undergoing explosive intensification in the mid-Atlantic; as a result, the agency issued a Special Warning regarding the formation of Hugo. Subsequently, AEMET issued red weather warnings for northern Portugal and orange warnings for the remainder of the mainland coast, with yellow warnings of wind and snow being issued further inland. Wind gusts of up to 100 km/h (62 mph; 54 kn) were recorded widely, with gusts of up to 120 km/h (75 mph; 65 kn) recorded in coastal areas in the north of the country.

=== Storm Irene ===
Irene
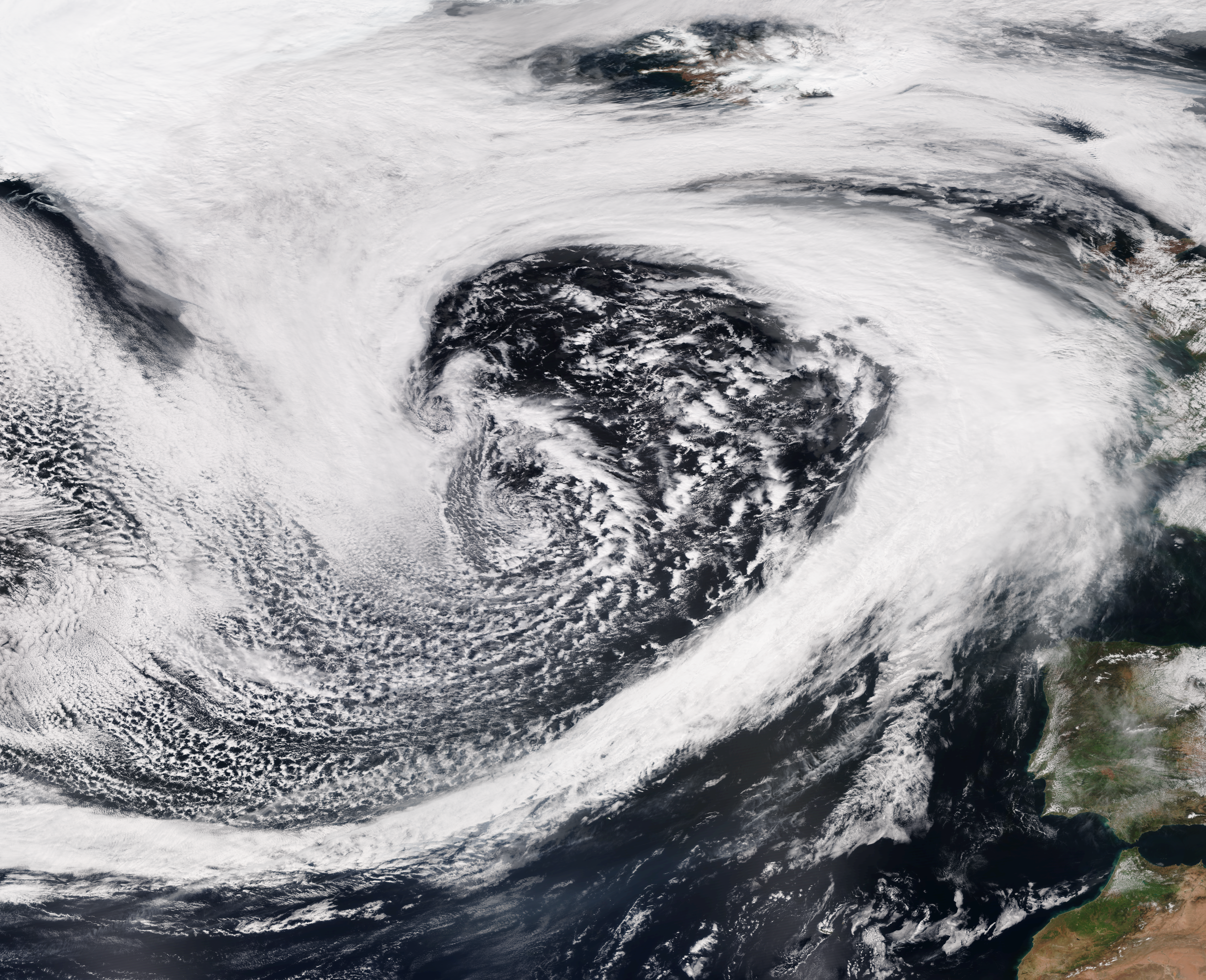
- Irene on 16 April
- Area affected: Azores
- Date of impact: 15–25 April
- Maximum wind gust: 110 km/h (68 mph; 59 kn)
- Lowest pressure: 952 hPa (28.1 inHg)
- Fatalities: 0
- Power outages: Unspecified
- Damage: Minimal

Storm Irene was named by the Azores Regional Department of Portugal's IPMA meteorological agency on 16 April. Moving swiftly northwards, Irene intensified into an unusually strong low for the region at this time of year, crossing the Azores archipelago with a minimum pressure of 952 hPa (28.1 inHg) and winds of up to 110 km/h (68 mph; 59 kn). As a result, orange weather warnings were issued for the islands. After crossing the Azores, Irene moved northwestwards into the open Atlantic and weakened, dissipating over the northern Atlantic without again affecting land.

=== Storm Hector ===
Hector
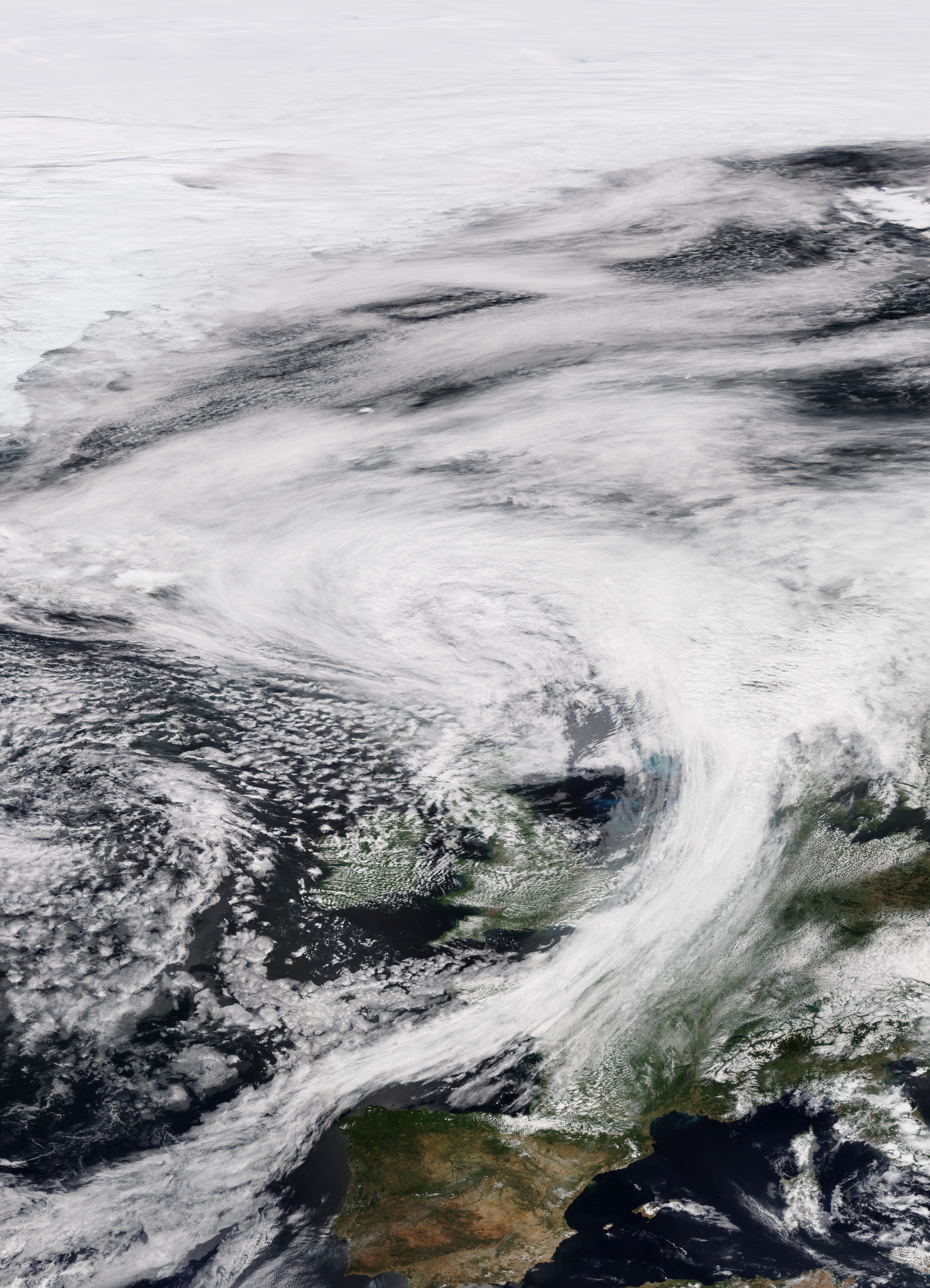
- Hector north of the UK & Ireland on 14 June
- Area affected: Ireland, United Kingdom and Norway
- Date of impact: 13–17 June
- Maximum wind gust: 110 km/h (70 mph; 61 kn), Cairngorms, Scotland
- Lowest pressure: 971 hPa (28.7 inHg)
- Fatalities: 0
- Power outages: Unspecified
- Damage: Minimal

Hector was the last-named storm of the 2017–2018 season which brought heavy rain and strong winds across the north of the UK and Ireland throughout 13 and 14 June. Met Éireann named the storm as an orange warning for wind was issued on 13 June. The storm arrived after a week-long spell of hot and sunny weather. Strong winds brought disruption to road and rail services, with widespread reports of fallen trees. The Forth and Tay bridges in Scotland were restricted to high sided vehicles as was the Tees flyover in northern England. Ferry services were also affected. Reports of flying debris hospitalised one individual in Edinburgh. Meanwhile, rough seas battered coastal communities. Widespread loss of power was reported in areas of Northern Ireland with up to 26,000 homes and businesses affected. Storm Hector did however bring a boost to the UK's energy supply in the form of wind power.

=== Other systems ===
Several notable extratropical cyclones affecting Europe went officially unnamed throughout the season as they did not affect any of the countries involved in issuing names; however, many of these did receive unofficial names from the Free University of Berlin. Cyclone Thomas rapidly deepened as it crossed Romania on 17–18 September, bringing intense straight-line winds to the country. Eight people were killed, with more than 137 injuries and 7,000 damage claims reported, totalling around US$9.4 million in damage.

Cyclone Xavier crossed northern Europe in early October 2017. Germany was the worst affected country, with high winds between 4 and 6 October causing severe damage, including in and around Berlin. Further damage was reported in the Czech Republic, where the highest winds of up to 201 km/h (125 mph; 109 kn) were recorded, and in Poland. In total, Xavier killed nine people—seven in Germany and two in Poland—and caused at least £180 million (€200 million) in damage.

Cyclone Herwart initially formed as a secondary low to a more northerly centre of low pressure (named Grischa) coming southward from the Svalbard Islands region in late October. Herwart then went through the Fujiwhara effect with this system, rotating counterclockwise around the main low pressure area, passing over Norway, Sweden, Latvia and then losing power while moving over western Russia. In Denmark, which was hit on 28 October, the storm was named Ingolf. In Hungary, the storm was named Nárcisz (Narcissus), a Hungarian female name whose name day is on 29 October. In total, Herwart killed ten people across central Europe and caused £800 million (€950 million) in damage.

Cyclone Reinhard (also known locally as Storm Ylva) made landfall in Norway on 23 November, with high winds and heavy rainfall causing millions of euros' worth of damage. There were hundreds of reports of damage across southern Norway, but no reports of injuries or fatalities.

A low-pressure area known as Storm Cora in Norway and Ex-Blizzard Aku in Finland brought wind gusts of up to 274 km/h (170 mph; 148 kn) to these areas in January 2018.

== Season effects ==
Storm	Dates active	Highest wind gust	Lowest pressure	Casualties	Damages	Affected areas
Aileen	12–18 September	160 km/h (100 mph; 87 kn)	978 hPa (28.9 inHg)	3	£8 million (€10 million)	Ireland, United Kingdom, Netherlands, Germany
Ophelia	16–20 October	191 km/h (119 mph; 103 kn)	958 hPa (28.3 inHg)	3	£75 million (€90 million)	Azores, Portugal, Spain, France, Ireland, United Kingdom, Faroe Islands, Norway, Sweden, Finland, Estonia, Russia
Brian	19–23 October	137 km/h (85 mph; 74 kn)	956 hPa (28.2 inHg)	3	Minimal	Ireland, United Kingdom, northern France
Caroline	6–11 December	150 km/h (93 mph; 81 kn)	958 hPa (28.3 inHg)	1	Minimal	Ireland, Scotland, Faroe Islands, Norway
Ana	10–16 December	249 km/h (155 mph; 135 kn)	957 hPa (28.3 inHg)	1	£175 million (€200 million)	Portugal, Spain, France, Germany, Belgium, Netherlands, Austria, Switzerland, Scandinavia, Russia
Bruno	26–30 December	154 km/h (96 mph; 83 kn)	976 hPa (28.8 inHg)	3	£60 million (€70 million)	Portugal, Spain, France
Dylan	30 December – 3 January	124 km/h (77 mph; 67 kn)	966 hPa (28.5 inHg)	0	Minimal	Ireland, Northern Ireland
Carmen	31 December–3 January	160 km/h (100 mph; 87 kn)	989 hPa (29.2 inHg)	1	£800 million (€900 million)	France, Belgium
Eleanor	2–5 January	230 km/h (140 mph; 120 kn)	966 hPa (28.5 inHg)	7	£850 million (€1 billion)	Ireland, Great Britain, Belgium, France, Germany, Netherlands, Switzerland
Fionn	14–21 January	237 km/h (147 mph; 128 kn)	935 hPa (27.6 inHg) ^{[Note 1]}	0	Minimal	Ireland, Scotland, Iceland, Greenland, United Kingdom, France, Central Europe
David	17–21 January	203 km/h (126 mph; 109 kn)	974 hPa (28.8 inHg)	13	£3.5 billion (€4.2 billion)	United Kingdom, Ireland, France, Netherlands, Belgium, Luxembourg, Germany, Austria, Switzerland, Italy, Poland, Czech Republic, Slovakia, Hungary, Belarus, Ukraine, Russia
Georgina	23–27 January	230 km/h (140 mph; 120 kn)	959 hPa (28.3 inHg)	0	Minimal	Ireland, Northern Ireland, Scotland, Norway
Emma	26 February – 7 March	229 km/h (142 mph; 123 kn)	963 hPa (28.4 inHg)	95	£1.8 billion (€2.1 billion)	Azores, Madeira, Canary Islands, Morocco, Portugal, Spain, France, Great Britain and Ireland
Felix	9–16 March	150 km/h (93 mph; 81 kn)	967 hPa (28.6 inHg)	0	£7.5 million (€9 million)	Azores, Madeira, Canary Islands, Portugal, Spain, France
Gisele	14–18 March	109 km/h (68 mph; 59 kn)	968 hPa (28.6 inHg)	0	£7.5 million (€9 million)	Azores, mainland Portugal, Spain
Hugo	23–29 March	121 km/h (75 mph; 65 kn)	971 hPa (28.7 inHg)	0	Minimal	Portugal
Irene	15–25 April	109 km/h (68 mph; 59 kn)	952 hPa (28.1 inHg)	0	Minimal	Azores
Hector	13–17 June	110 km/h (70 mph; 61 kn)	971 hPa (28.7 inHg)	0	Minimal	Ireland and Great Britain
18 windstorms	12 September 2017 – 17 June 2018	249 km/h (155 mph; 135 kn)	935 hPa (27.6 inHg)	130	£7.3 billion (€8.6 billion)	

== Storms named by European meteorological services ==
IR satellite loop storm Herwart (Ingolf) on 29 October 2017

Satellite loop of Friederike (David) airmass from EUMETSAT.

- Aileen (UK/IE), Sebastian (Free University of Berlin), 12–13 September.
- Xavier (Free University of Berlin), 4–6 October.
- Brian (UK/IE), Elmar (Free University of Berlin), 21 October.
- Herwart (FUB), Ingolf (dk) Grzegorz (Polish derivative of the FUB name), 28–29 October.
- Ylva (No), Reinhard (FUB), 22–23 November.
- Caroline (UK/IE), Walter (FUB), Aina (No), 7–8 December 2017.
- Ana (Fr/Es/Pt), Yves (FUB), 10–11 December.
- Birk (No-for heavy rainfall), Diethelm (FUB), 23 December 2017.
- Bruno (Fr/Es/Pt), Edilbert (FUB), 26–27 December 2017.
- Dylan (UK/IE), Horst (FUB), 29–31 December 2017.
- Carmen (Fr/Es/Pt), Ingmar (FUB), 1 January 2018.
- Eleanor (UK/IE), Burglind (FUB), 2–3 January 2018.
- Aku (Fin), Cora (No), Unnamed (FUB) -later absorbed by Christine, 7 January 2018.
- Fionn (UK/IE), Evi (FUB), 16 January 2018.
- David (Fr/Es/Pt), Friederike (FUB), 18 January 2018.
- Georgina (UK/IE), Helene (FUB), 23–24 January 2018.
- Emma (Fr/Es/Pt), Ulrike (FUB), 26 February – 5 March 2018
- Felix (Fr/Es/Pt), Yuliya (FUB), 10–11 March 2018
- Gisele (Fr/Es/Pt), Zsuzsa (FUB), 14 March 2018.
- Hugo (Fr/Es/Pt) Carola (FUB) 24–25 March 2018.
- Irene (Fr/Es/Pt) 30 March–10 April 2018.

== See also ==
- Cyclone Numa, a medicane in November 2017
- 2018 Great Britain and Ireland cold wave
- 2017–2018 North American winter
- List of historical European windstorm names

== Notes ==
1. Lowest pressure for the cyclonic centre of Fionn was achieved on 14 January to the north of Iceland, at the time of Fionn's naming on 16 January the cyclonic centre had substantially filled to about 961 hPa (28.4 inHg).
2. The 228 km/h (142 mph; 123 kn) gust occurred in the squeezed isobar region between the centres of Emma and Hartmut, thus it was probably caused by the mixed effects of the two systems due to their collision.
