= Cyclone Herwart =

2017 European windstorm

- IR satellite loop storm Herwart/Ingolf on 29 October 2017

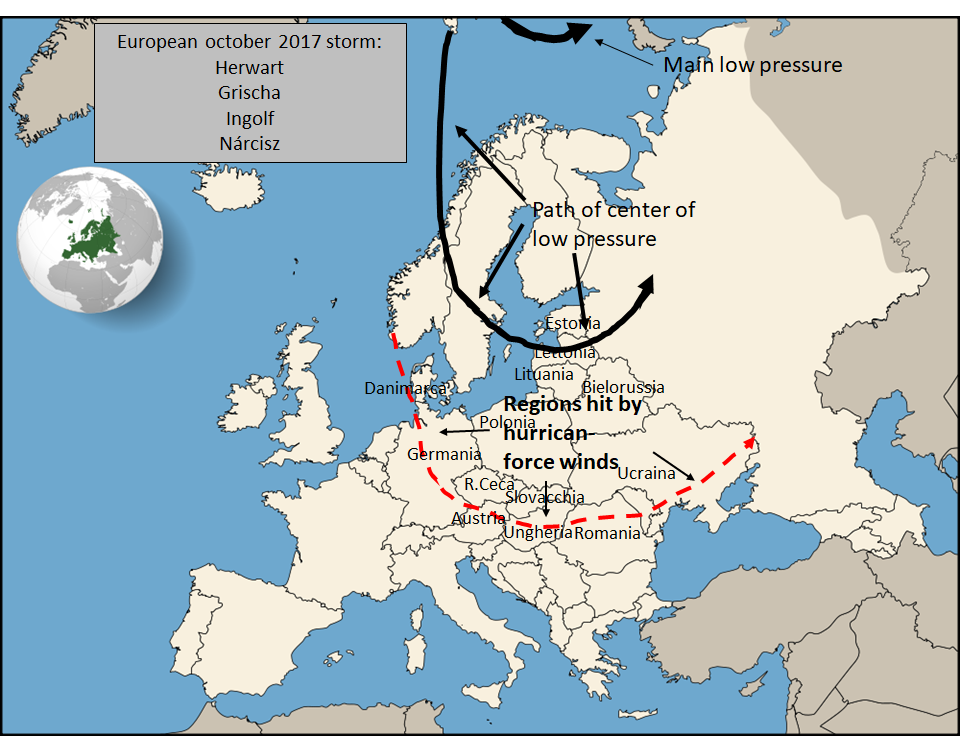
- Path of Cyclone Herwart-Ingolf across Europe (Part of the 2017–18 European windstorm season)
- Area affected: Denmark, Germany, Poland, Czech Republic, Austria, Slovakia, Hungary.
- Date of impact: 29 October 2017
- Maximum wind gust: 182 km/h (113 mph) (Luční bouda)
- Lowest pressure: 970 hPa (29 inHg)
- Fatalities: 11

Cyclone Herwart was a European windstorm that affected Southern Denmark, Germany, Poland, Austria, Hungary and the Czech Republic on 28–29 October 2017. Named by the Free University of Berlin Meteorology Department, the storm was an extratropical cyclone formed as a secondary low to a more northerly centre of low pressure named Grischa coming southward from the Svalbard Islands region, the latter splitting in two low-pressure areas late on 28 October. The center of Herwart started rotating counterclockwise around the main low pressure area, passing over Norway, Sweden, Latvia and then losing power while moving over western Russia.

In Denmark, which was hit on 28 October, the storm was named Ingolf. In Hungary, the storm was named Nárcisz (Narcissus), a Hungarian female name whose name day is on 29 October.

== Impact ==
The storm and rainfall caused death and destruction. Train connections were closed in Northern Germany, and major bridges in Denmark were closed for traffic. Herwart caused disruption to the German energy market as the strong winds caused an over-supply of energy onto the German power grid. Prices for energy slipped into negative values as low as minus €83.06 per megawatt hour, with an average low of minus €52.11 (normal energy prices are €37 per megawatt hour). These values were the lowest since Christmas 2012. This can lead to a situation where Austria and Switzerland find it attractive to use the energy in their pumped storage reservoirs, where it can later be sold back to Germany.

Herwart was not as strong as Xavier which struck Germany earlier in October 2017. Herwart is considered one of the strongest storms of the past 10 years in Germany, ranked in 8th place in the strongest storms there in the last decade, but not considered memorable when compared to the strongest storms such as Kyrill (2007) and Lothar (1999). Herwart was responsible for the worst insurance losses in the Czech Republic since the storms Kyrill and Emma (2008).
