= Storm Eleanor (2018) =

2018 European windstorm

- Satellite animation of Eleanor's lifetime over Western Europe (Seviri RGB Airmass view)

Meteorological history
- Formed: 2 January 2018
- Dissipated: 4 January 2018

Extratropical cyclone European windstorm
- Highest gusts: 226 km/h (140 mph), Goldau (alt 578 m [1,896 ft])
- Lowest pressure: 966 hPa (28.5 inHg)

Overall effects
- Fatalities: 6
- Damage: Initial €643 million insured loss.
- Areas affected: Austria, Belgium, France, Germany, Ireland, Luxembourg, the Netherlands, Switzerland, and the United Kingdom
- Power outages: ~150000 customers in Republic of Ireland affected
- Part of the 2017-18 European windstorm season

Storm Eleanor (known as Cyclone Burglind in Germany) was an extratropical cyclone and European windstorm that affected Ireland, the United Kingdom, France, Benelux, Germany, Austria and Switzerland on the 2–3 January 2018. The storm caused extensive damage and traffic disruption. It was given the name Eleanor by Met Éireann and the UK Met Office, while the Free University of Berlin named the low pressure Burglind.

== Meteorological history ==
Eleanor developed to the west of Ireland as a secondary cyclone on 2 January to the parent low "Alja" to the southwest of Iceland, developing as a wave along the trailing cold front of the parent low. Eleanor rapidly intensified reaching a minimum pressure of 966 hPa (28.5 inHg) as it moved east across Scotland under a strong westerly jet stream. Before the low centre tracked across the North Sea to Denmark. To the south of the central low Eleanor caused strong winds which covered a large footprint of across much of western Europe.

The ECMWF operational forecast model of maximum winds featured a narrow corridor of strong winds crossing Ireland and Northern Ireland, which they suggested could be indicative of a Sting jet.

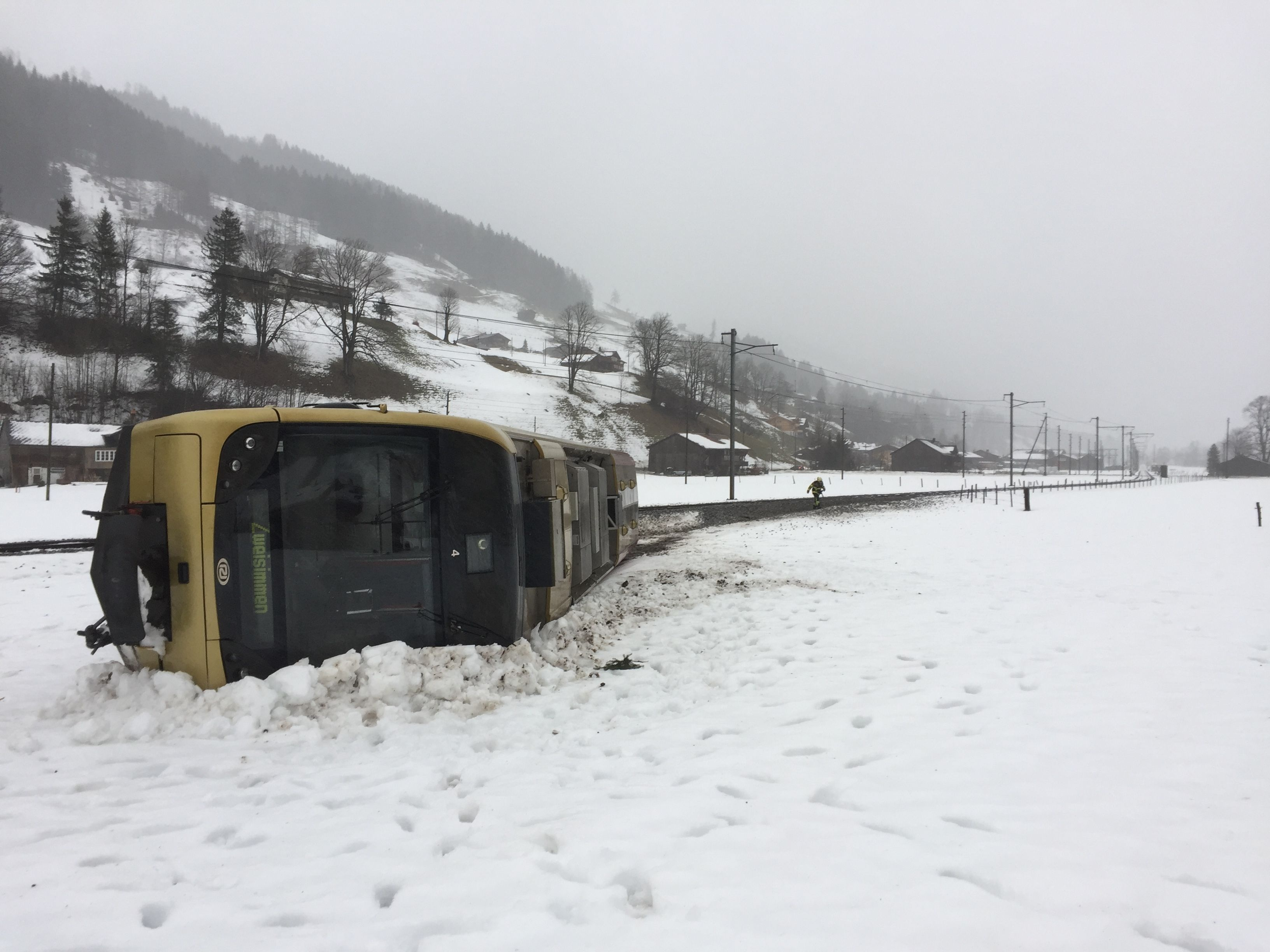
A train came off the rails near Lenk, Switzerland during Burglind.

== Highest wind gust per country ==
Country	Gust	Location
Austria	206 km/h (128 mph)	Arlberg
Belgium	145 km/h (90 mph)	St. Vith
France	177 km/h (110 mph)	Pointe du Raz
Germany	160 km/h (99 mph)	Brocken
Ireland	146 km/h (91 mph)	Rosslare Harbour
Italy	207 km/h (129 mph)	Dolomites
Luxembourg	105 km/h (65 mph)	Wiltz
Netherlands	141 km/h (88 mph)	Vlissingen
Switzerland	226 km/h (140 mph)	Goldau
United Kingdom	193 km/h (120 mph)	Glen Coe

== See also ==
- 2017–18 European windstorm season
