= Cyclone Xavier (2017) =

2017 European windstorm

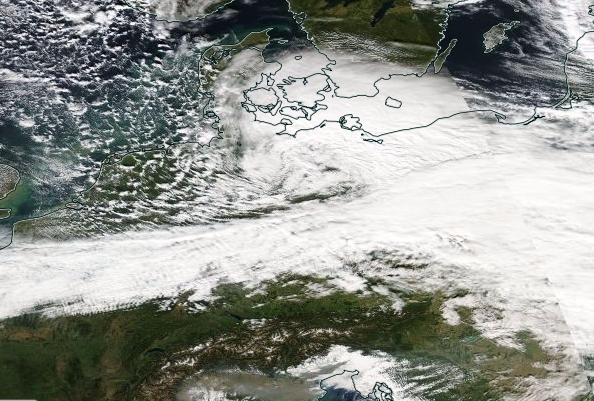
- Aqua Modis satellite view of Xavier crossing Germany and Poland on 5 October 2017.

Meteorological history
- Formed: 4 October 2017
- Dissipated: 6 October 2017

European windstorm
- Highest gusts: 202 km/h (126 mph), (Mountain value) Sněžka, Czech Republic
- Lowest pressure: 985 mbar (985 hPa)

Overall effects
- Fatalities: 9 (7 Germany, 2 Poland)
- Areas affected: Germany; Poland; Czech Republic
- Part of the 2017–18 European windstorm season

Cyclone Xavier is a European windstorm that swept across northern Europe in early October 2017. Germany was the worst affected country, with high winds between 4 and 6 October causing severe damage, including in and around Berlin. Further damage was reported in the Czech Republic, where the highest winds of up to 125 miles per hour (201 km/h) were recorded, and in Poland.

== Development ==
Coming from the North Atlantic Ocean, the depression travelled 3,000 kilometres (1,900 mi) within 24 hours. During the night of 4 October, Xavier moved across Great Britain towards the North Sea arriving at the border region between Denmark and Germany on 5 October late in the morning. Later on 5 October, the most powerful areas of the storm developed at the south-western flank of the depression's center. At noon, the storm had reached the northern German states of Lower Saxony and Schleswig-Holstein and swept across Saxony-Anhalt and the southern parts of Mecklenburg-Vorpommern in the afternoon. In the evening of 5 October, Xavier arrived in Brandenburg, Berlin, Thuringia and Saxony. For several hours, severe storm with wind speeds of 10 Beaufort, gust of 117 kilometres per hour (73 mph) and single gusts up to 12 Beaufort coming from West to Northwest were recorded there. The lowest pressure recorded in Germany was 985 hectopascals (985 mb; 29.1 inHg).

Storm Xavier reached hurricane strength at many locations. On the Brocken mountain in Germany, the wind speed reached 178 kilometres per hour (111 mph) while 120 kilometres per hour (75 mph) was recorded on Spiekeroog island in the North Sea. On Mount Sněžka in the Czech Republic, a peak speed of 202 kilometres per hour (126 mph) was observed.

== Forecast and preparations ==
=== Forecast ===
In a preliminary notice on 4 October, the German Weather Service had announced a potential for storms with hurricane-like gusts and hurricane gusts on the next day from 10 a.m. through 6 p.m. in the North and from 2 through 10 p.m. in the East of Germany. This announcement was turned into a storm warning in the evening of 4 October.

=== Preparations ===
The population in Germany was warned through the 'NINA' smartphone app published by the Federal Office of Civil Protection and Disaster Assistance. The Berlin fire brigade declared a state of emergency on 5 October while on the same day, the Hamburg fire brigade urged people not to stay outside during the storm.

== Impact ==
=== Germany ===
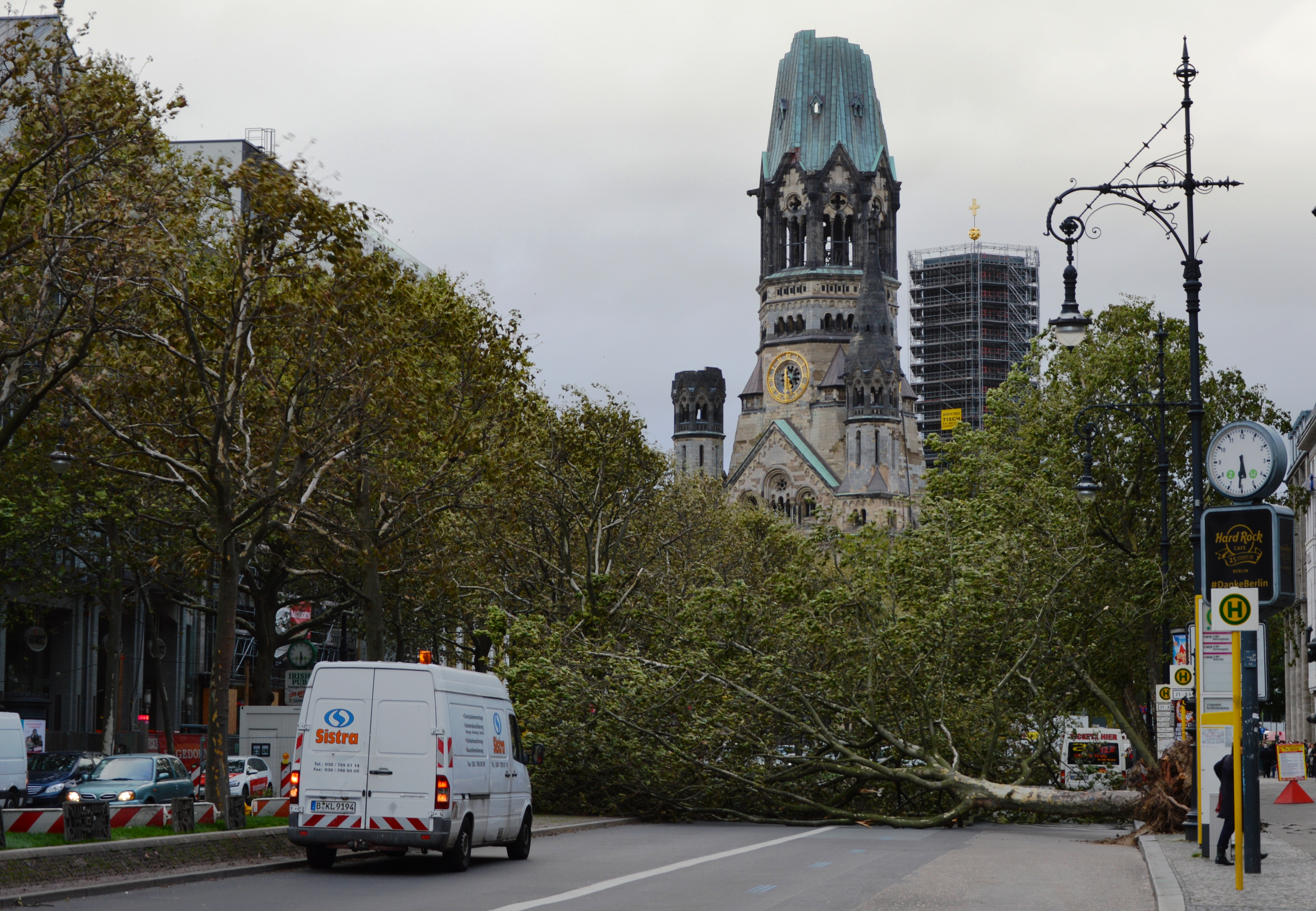
Fallen trees in Berlin

In Berlin, Hamburg, Brandenburg und Mecklenburg-Vorpommern, seven people died due to the storm. In Berlin, journalist and author Sylke Tempel was killed by a falling tree, four persons died under similar circumstances in Brandenburg and one fatality occurred in Hamburg. In the harbour town of Wilhelmshaven, the storm toppled a gantry crane that weighed c. 1,000 tonnes (2,200,000 lb).

Numerous railway lines in Germany became impassable forcing rail traffic to be shut down.

=== Poland ===
At least two people were killed and 39 sustained injuries. A man died in Lubusz Voivodeship by falling from a roof and in Greater Poland Voivodeship, a woman was killed by a falling branch. The storm primarily struck the South and West of the country. According to the Polish government's security centre, some 800,000 people were temporarily without electric power. 40,000 relief personnel were called to 10,000 situations across Poland.

=== Czech Republic ===
In the Czech Republic, the fire services had to tend to several hundred calls. A regional train hit a tree on the tracks near Bělá (Semily District) and some railway lines had to be closed completely.
