= Cyclone Hergen =

European windstorm, December 2011

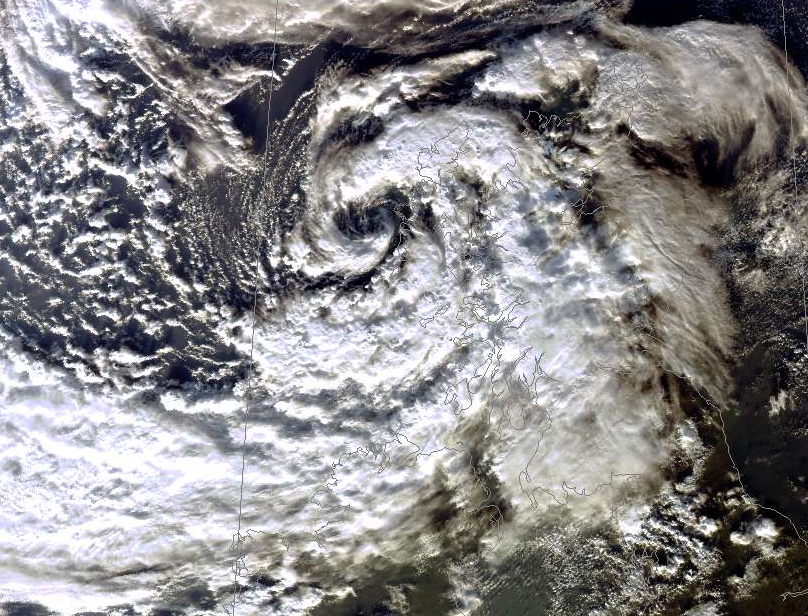
- Hergen on 13 December 2011

Meteorological history
- Formed: 11 December 2011
- Dissipated: 19 December 2011

European windstorm, Extratropical cyclone
- Lowest pressure: 945 mb (27.9 inHg)

Overall effects
- Areas affected: Newfoundland, United Kingdom, Ireland, Norway

Cyclone Hergen was an intense European windstorm that moved across Northern Europe during mid December 2011. It was first noted over the central North Atlantic Ocean by the Met Office. It then later reached peak intensity just northwest of Ireland and then crossed the north of Scotland hours later. It hung around the coast of Norway for the next week before being absorbed by another strong windstorm named Joachim.

Hergen was not the first storm to strike Western Europe during the last week as Cyclone Friedhelm brought widespread damage and very strong winds on 8 December. Hergen was followed by Joachim a few days later, then Oliver /Patrick (Cato/Dagmar) during the Christmas holiday. Cyclone Ulli then brought major damage and flooding to Northern Europe during the early part of January 2012.

== Meteorological history ==
On 11 December 2011, the Met Office had noted a complex weather system over the central Atlantic, associated with several warm and cold fronts. An amplified jet stream—a strong and fast-moving airstream aloft—advanced eastward, sparking rapid cyclogenesis along the fronts. By the following day, a low-pressure centre had developed along an occlusion between two of the fronts. The low rapidly deepened as it approached the British Isles, with a developing occluded rainband producing sustained winds of up to 60 mph (97 km/h). It later deepened to a minimum barometric pressure of 945 mb (27.9 inHg), centred just northwest of Ireland. A 67 feet (20 m) wave was recorded off the coast of County Donegal at 1400 UTC on 13 December. On 14 December, Hergen had moved slightly to the northeast while centred just off the coast of the Shetland Isles. By this time, the system had lost its weather fronts. The storm moved slowly offshore Norway for the next few days before being absorbed by the larger Cyclone Joachim on 19 December.

== Preparations and warnings ==
On 10 December, a low pressure system formed over Labrador. This storm rapidly deepened as it moved towards the United Kingdom, which led to the Met Office issuing severe weather warnings. At the time, the forecast storms were considered to be equivalent to a Category 4 hurricane on the Saffir-Simpson Hurricane Scale. The storm was only expected to strike parts of England and Wales. Forecasters at multiple meteorological agencies in the United Kingdom said that snow could fall in southern England which would have been the first of the season. They also said that winds could reach 100 mph (160 km/h), however, there was not much confidence with this prediction.

== Impact ==
The low brought strong winds and rain to Hampshire, flooding streets and felling trees. In some areas, the winds reached speeds of 70 mph (110 km/h), just below hurricane force. A 60 ft (18 m) tree crashed down onto a home in Winchester, causing heavy damage and almost killing a resident inside. In Kent, the Port of Dover was shut from 10:30 p.m. to 5:30 p.m. GMT on 11–12 December. The Scotland transport minister warned of snow and strong winds which could have led to widespread travel disruption. Icy conditions prevailed in Scotland, Northern Ireland and Northern England early on 13 December.

In Norway, a ferry was delayed by 17.5 hours by the large waves caused by the storm, leaving some injured.
