= Dagmar of Denmark =

Dagmar of Denmark may refer to:

- Dagmar of Bohemia (1186–1212), Queen consort of Denmark, wife of King Valdemar II of Denmark
- Princess Dagmar of Denmark (1890–1961), daughter of Frederick VIII of Denmark and his wife, Princess Louise of Sweden and Norway
- Maria Feodorovna (Dagmar of Denmark) (1847–1928), Empress consort of Russia

== See also ==
- Dagmar (given name)
- Dagmar (disambiguation)
