= Climate of Scotland =

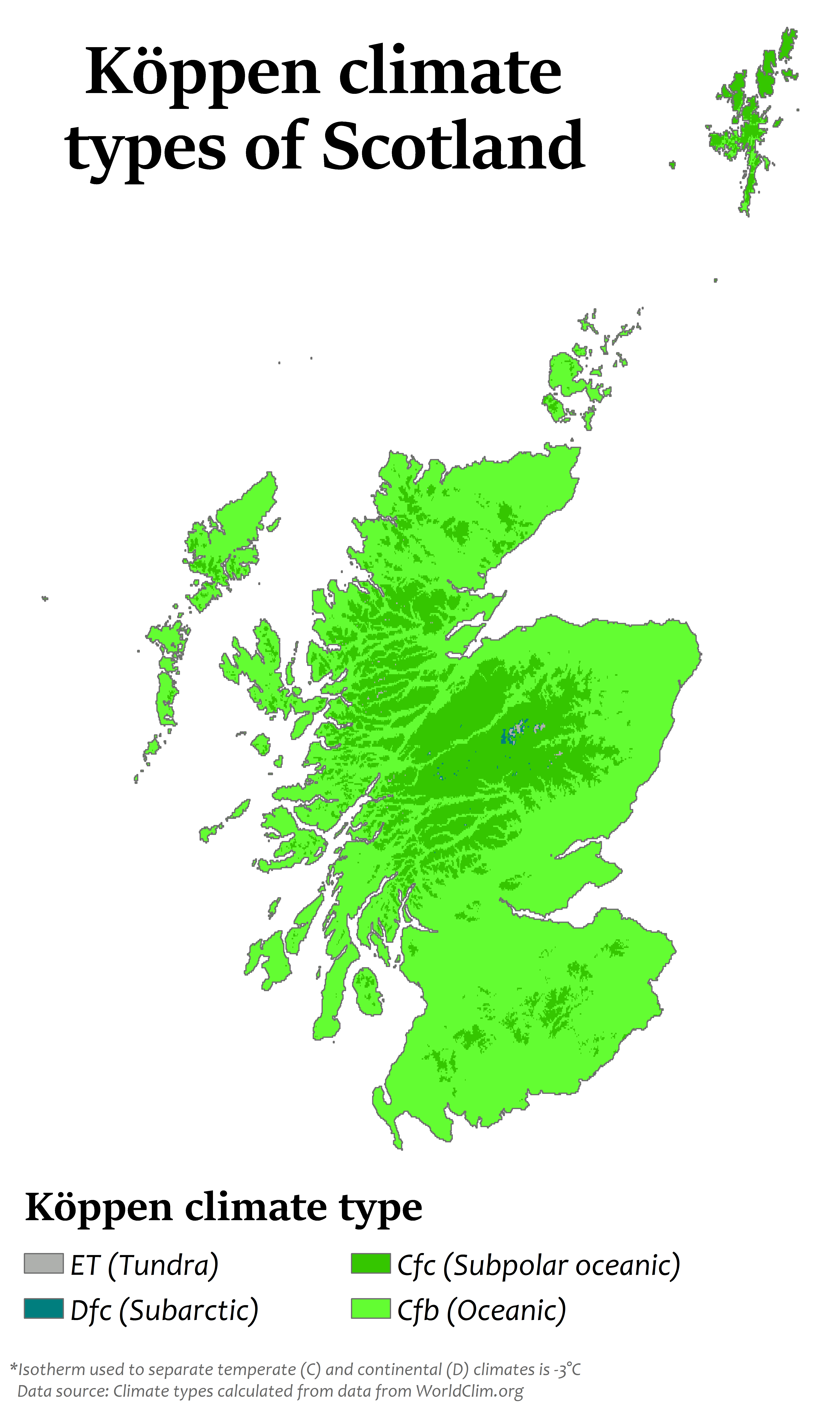
Köppen climate types in Scotland

Weather and climate in the country of Scotland is mostly temperate and oceanic (Köppen climate classification Cfb), and tends to be very changeable, but rarely extreme. The country is warmed by the Gulf Stream from the Atlantic, and given its northerly latitude it is much warmer than areas on similar latitudes, for example Kamchatka in Russia or Labrador in Canada (where the sea freezes over in winter), or Fort McMurray, Canada (where −35 °C (−31 °F) is not uncommon during winter). Scots sometimes describe weather which is grey and gloomy using the Scots language word dreich.

Across the country, June, July and August are commonly the warmest months, with an average temperature of 17°C (63°F) common, whilst in contrast, December, January and February are often the coldest with average temperatures averaging 6°C (43°F). Given the latitude of Scotland, the north of the country generally receives more daylight in midsummer than the south of the British Isles, and in the far north of the country during summer, there is often no complete darkness. Nautical twilight persists throughout the entire night at the summer solstice for the entire country. Weather conditions across the country can vary drastically, even within a short distance. In spring, Scotland's temperatures can average between 12°C (54°F) and 4°C (40°F), with an average rainfall of 48mm or 1.89". In Winter, temperatures commonly range between 7°C (45°F) and 2°C (36°F) with an average rainfall of 57mm or 2.44".

The Scottish Government and the Met Office are the primary bodies responsible for weather management and warnings in the country, with Safer Scotland serving as the executive agency of the Scottish Government responsible for preparation for extreme weather, whilst the Scottish Environment Protection Agency (SEPA) is responsible for the flood mitigation, protection and warnings. The Scottish Government Resilience Room may be activated during periods of intense weather in the country, such as prolonged rainfall or wind storms.

== Seasons ==
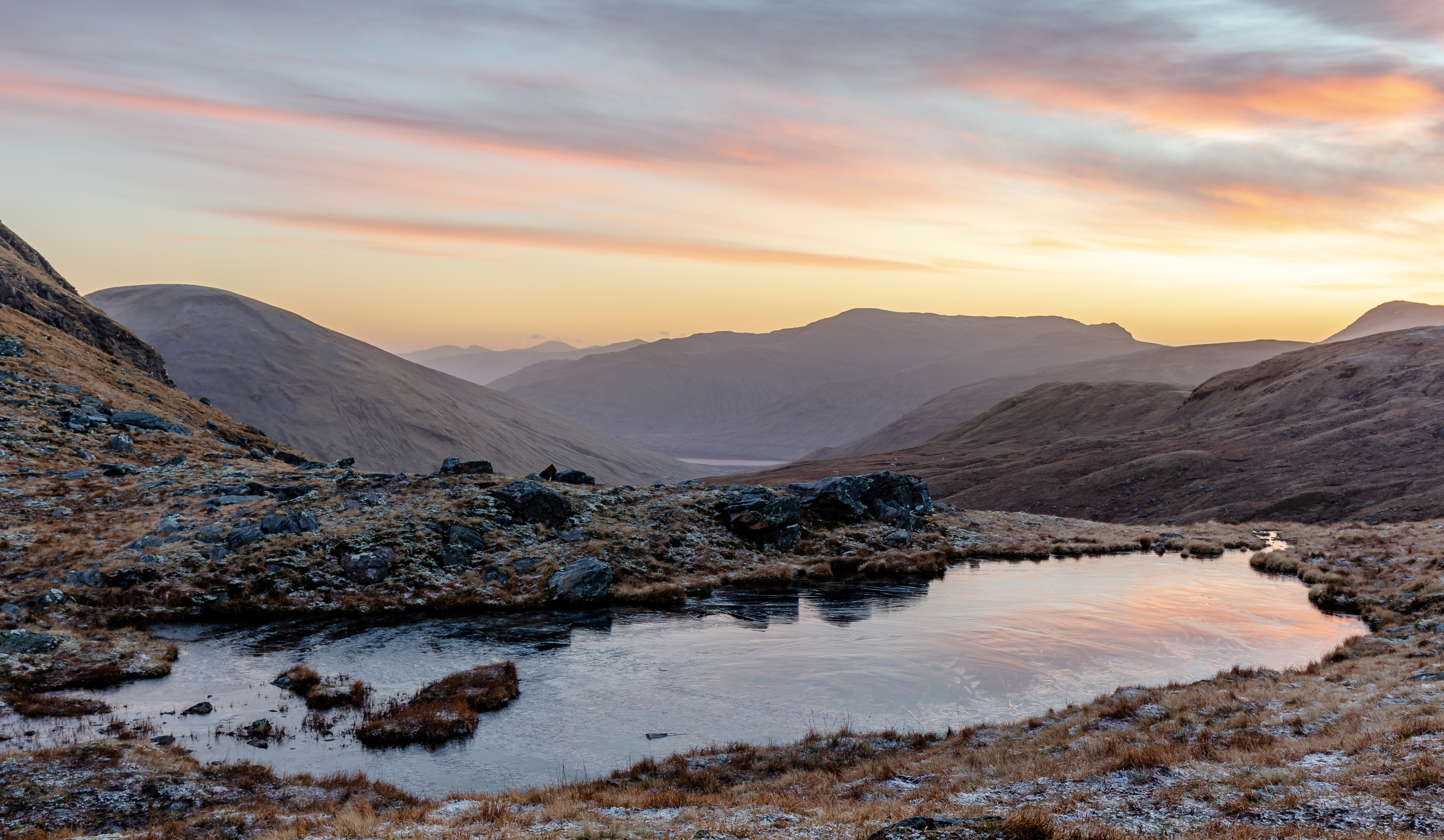
Winter sunrise in Scotland (January 2019)

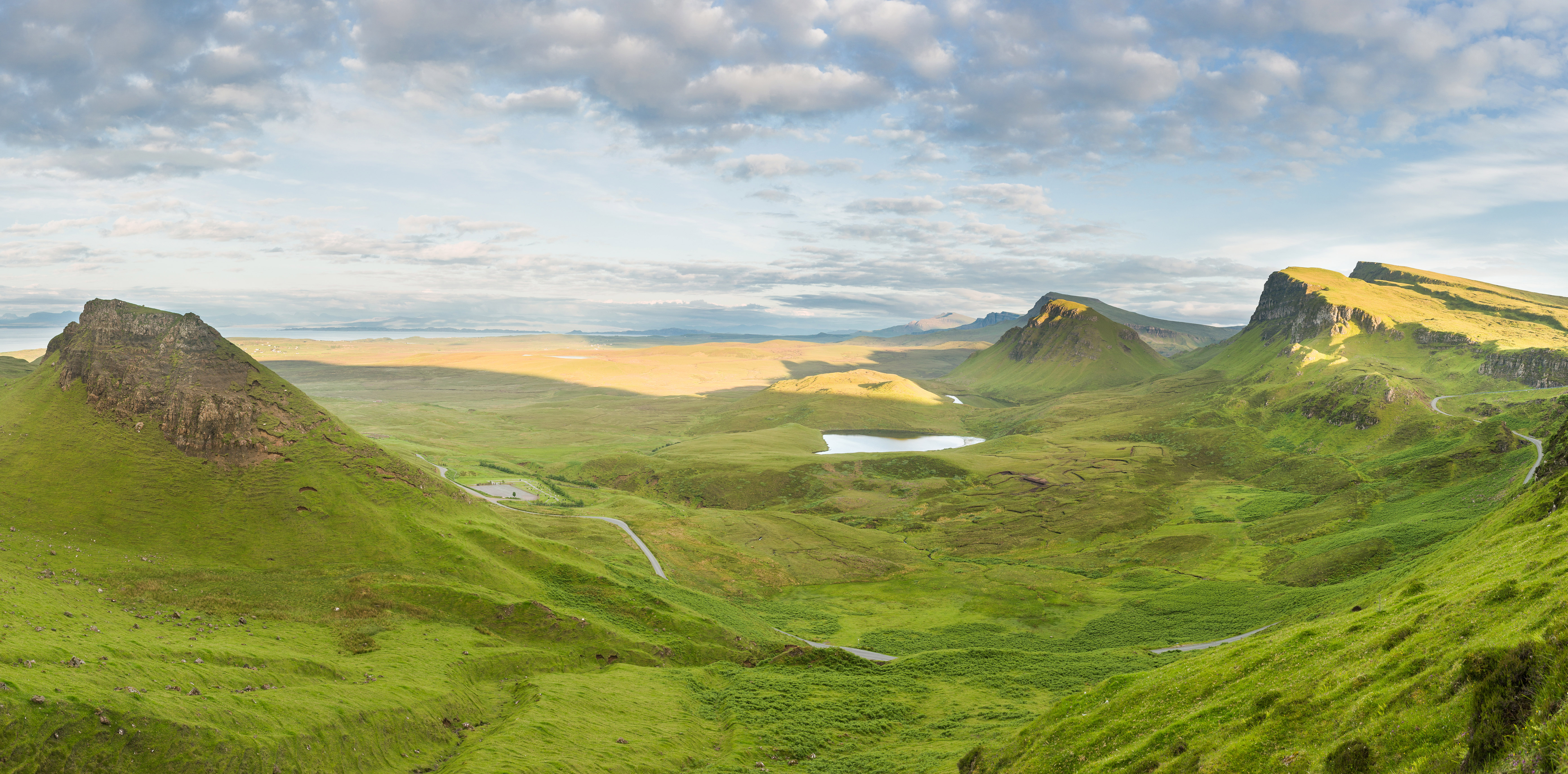
Summer weather in Scotland (June 2014)

During spring, the country experiences a milder climate with average daily temperatures ranging between 12°C (54°F) and 4°C (40°F) with an average 13 hours of daylight. Rainfall averages 48mm across the country, however, due to the milder climate, flowers such as the cherry blossom begin to bloom along with the re-emergance of various animals who have hibernated over the winter period.

Summer in Scotland typically ranges between June and August annually. During the summer period, temperatures typically average 18°C (64°F) during the daytime and 11°C (52°F) in the evenings, with an average 17 hours worth of daylight. During this period, the country can commonly average a rainfall of 72mm, or 2.8", making Summer commonly the wettest season in Scotland. Despite being the wettest season in the country, it also serves as the warmest of the four seasons in Scotland, and the northerly latitude of the country means that parts of Scotland benefit from longer daylight periods as well as an extended twilight.

Between September and November, Scotland enters Autumn and temperatures begin to decline from their Summer highs, with average temperatures of 13°C (55°F) in the daytime and 7°C (45°F) in the evenings common. The amount of rainfall the country receives also falls to 52mm on average. During the early transition from Summer into Autumn, the climate across the country is often mild before becoming cooler particularly into October. During Autumn, clocks change from British Summer Time to Daylight saving time which reduces daylight hours to an average of 11 hours of daylight.

Winter in Scotland ranges between December and February and is the coldest season experienced across the country. With an average of 8 hours of daylight, temperatures fall drastically during Winter, with daily averages of 7°C (45°F) during the daytime and 2°C (36°F) in the evenings common, with an average rainfall of 57mm.

== Temperature ==
Scotland occupies the cooler northern section of Great Britain, so temperatures are generally lower than in the rest of the British Isles, with the coldest ever UK temperature of −27.2 °C (−17.0 °F) recorded at Braemar in the Grampian Mountains, on 11 February 1895 and again on 10 January 1982 and also at Altnaharra, Highland, on 30 December 1995.

Winters in Scotland have an average low of around 0 °C (32 °F), with summer maximum temperatures averaging 15–17 °C (59–63 °F). In general, the western coastal areas of Scotland are warmer than the east and inland areas, due to the influence of the Atlantic currents, and the colder surface temperatures of the North Sea. The highest official temperature recorded was 34.8 °C (94.6 °F) in Charterhall, Scottish Borders on 19 July 2022.

For the last 100 years, the coldest winter was in 1963 (average temperature 0.19 °C or 32.34 °F) and the mildest was in 1989 (average 5.15 °C or 41.27 °F). The warmest summer was in 2003 (average 14.07 °C or 57.33 °F) and the coolest was in 1922 (average 10.64 °C or 51.15 °F).

Climate data for Scotland (1991–2020 normals, extremes 1865-present)
| Month | Jan | Feb | Mar | Apr | May | Jun | Jul | Aug | Sep | Oct | Nov | Dec | Year |
|---|---|---|---|---|---|---|---|---|---|---|---|---|---|
| Record high °C (°F) | 19.9 (67.8) | 18.3 (64.9) | 23.6 (74.5) | 27.2 (81.0) | 30.9 (87.6) | 32.2 (90.0) | 34.8 (94.6) | 32.9 (91.2) | 32.2 (90.0) | 27.4 (81.3) | 20.6 (69.1) | 18.7 (65.7) | 34.8 (94.6) |
| Mean daily maximum °C (°F) | 5.55 (41.99) | 5.95 (42.71) | 7.63 (45.73) | 10.32 (50.58) | 13.37 (56.07) | 15.59 (60.06) | 17.29 (63.12) | 16.96 (62.53) | 14.78 (58.60) | 11.27 (52.29) | 7.97 (46.35) | 5.82 (42.48) | 11.07 (51.93) |
| Mean daily minimum °C (°F) | 0.34 (32.61) | 0.26 (32.47) | 1.19 (34.14) | 2.78 (37.00) | 4.98 (40.96) | 7.86 (46.15) | 9.70 (49.46) | 9.61 (49.30) | 7.88 (46.18) | 5.14 (41.25) | 2.48 (36.46) | 0.37 (32.67) | 4.40 (39.92) |
| Record low °C (°F) | −27.2 (−17.0) | −27.2 (−17.0) | −22.8 (−9.0) | −15.4 (4.3) | −8.8 (16.2) | −5.6 (21.9) | −2.5 (27.5) | −4.5 (23.9) | −6.7 (19.9) | −11.7 (10.9) | −23.3 (−9.9) | −27.2 (−17.0) | −27.2 (−17.0) |
| Average precipitation mm (inches) | 178.02 (7.01) | 140.74 (5.54) | 124.59 (4.91) | 93.08 (3.66) | 89.23 (3.51) | 92.95 (3.66) | 103.73 (4.08) | 119.98 (4.72) | 123.34 (4.86) | 168.33 (6.63) | 165.37 (6.51) | 174.30 (6.86) | 1,573.64 (61.95) |
| Average precipitation days (≥ 1 mm) | 18.48 | 16.10 | 15.92 | 13.70 | 13.38 | 13.75 | 14.93 | 15.51 | 14.85 | 17.96 | 18.48 | 18.24 | 191.30 |
| Mean monthly sunshine hours | 35.26 | 63.49 | 97.46 | 141.73 | 182.22 | 146.25 | 140.50 | 134.54 | 106.56 | 74.72 | 47.58 | 29.74 | 1,200.05 |
Source: The Met Office: averages, sunshine, precipitation; extremes

== Frequent weather ==
=== Rainfall ===
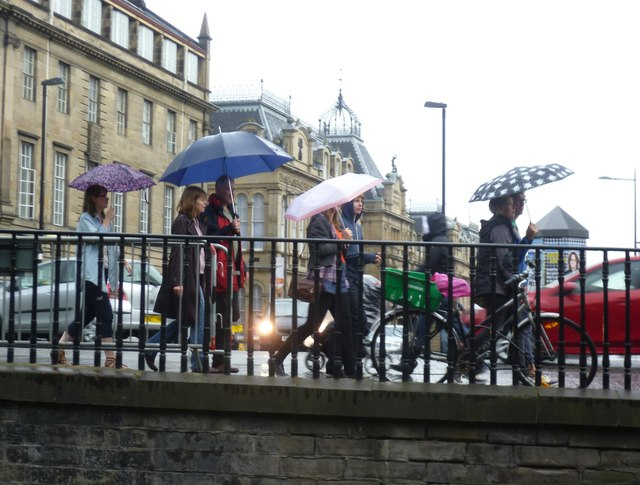
Rainfall in Edinburgh

Rainfall totals vary widely across Scotland— the western highlands of Scotland is one of the wettest places in Europe with annual rainfall up to 4,577 mm (180.2 in). Due to the mountainous topography of the western Highlands, this type of precipitation is orographic in nature, with the warm, wet air forced to rise on contact with the mountainous coast, where it consequently cools and condenses, forming clouds. In comparison, much of eastern Scotland receives less than 870 mm (34.3 in) annually; lying in the rain shadow of the western uplands. This effect is most pronounced along the coasts of Lothian, Fife, Angus and eastern Aberdeenshire, as well as around the city of Inverness. Inchkeith in the Firth of Forth receives only 550 mm (21.7 in) of precipitation each year, which is similar to Rabat in Morocco, and less than Barcelona receives per year. Also, as a result of this the north-western coast has about 265 days with rain a year and this falls to the south east to a minimum of about 170 days along the coast to the east of high ground. Snowfall is less common in the lowlands, but becomes more common with altitude. Parts of the Highlands have an average of 36 to 105 snow days per year, while some western coastal areas have between 12 and 17 days with snow a year.

=== Sunshine ===
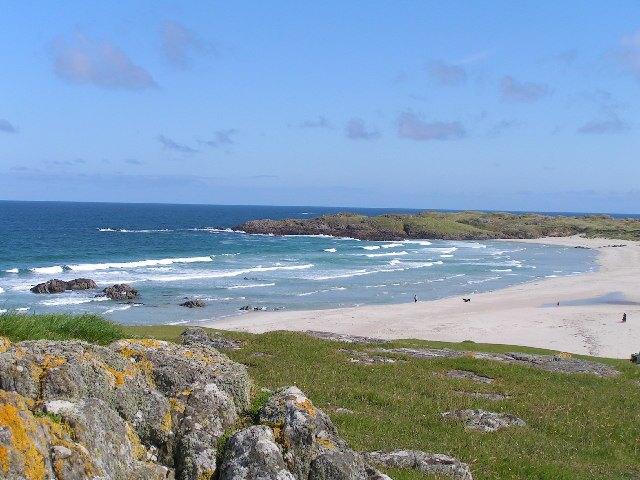
Tiree is often regarded as the sunniest location in Scotland.

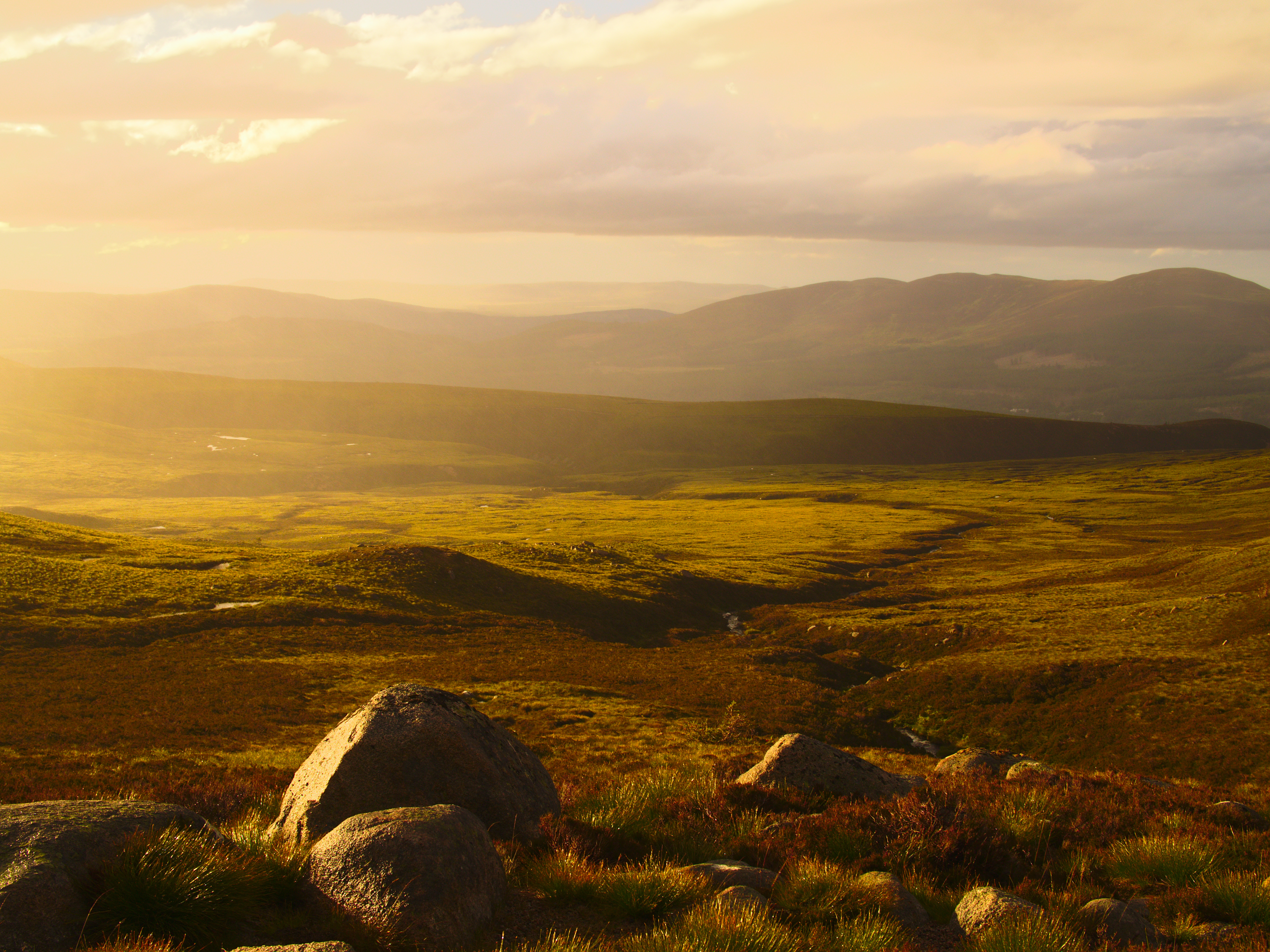
Cloudy sunset in Highland

The maximum amount of sunshine in a calendar month was 329 hours in Tiree in May 1946 and again in May 1975 while the minimum, a mere 36 minutes, was recorded at Cape Wrath in the Highlands in January 1983.

Dundee and Aberdeen are the sunniest cities in Scotland. On the longest day of the year there is no complete darkness over the northern isles of Scotland. Lerwick, Shetland, has about four hours more daylight at midsummer than London, although this is reversed in midwinter.

Annual average sunshine totals vary from as little as 711–1140 hours in the highlands and the north-west, up to 1471–1540 hours on the extreme eastern and south-western coasts. Average annual sunshine hours over the whole territory are 1160 (taking 1971 to 2000 as standard) meaning that the sun shines just over 25% of the time.

During a prolonged period of sunshine towards the end of March–mid April 2025, a number of wildfires broke out across Scotland, mostly notably in the Isle of Arran, Cumbernauld, Edinburgh and at the Galloway Forest Park in Dumfries and Galloway. The Scottish Fire and Rescue Service urged the public to "act responsibly" as the threat of wildfires across Scotland continued.

=== Winds ===
Scotland is the windiest country in Europe due to eastward moving Atlantic depressions that bring strong winds and clouds continuously throughout the year. In common with the rest of the United Kingdom, wind prevails from the south-west.

The windiest areas of Scotland are in the north and west; parts of the Western Isles, Orkney and Shetland have over 30 days with gale force winds per year. Vigorous Atlantic depressions, also known as European windstorms, are a common feature in the autumn and winter in Scotland. The strongest wind gust recorded in Scotland was officially 278 km/h (173 mph) on 20 March 1986 in the Cairngorms, but an unofficial wind speed of 312 km/h (194 mph) was recorded in the same location on 19 December 2008.

=== Storms ===
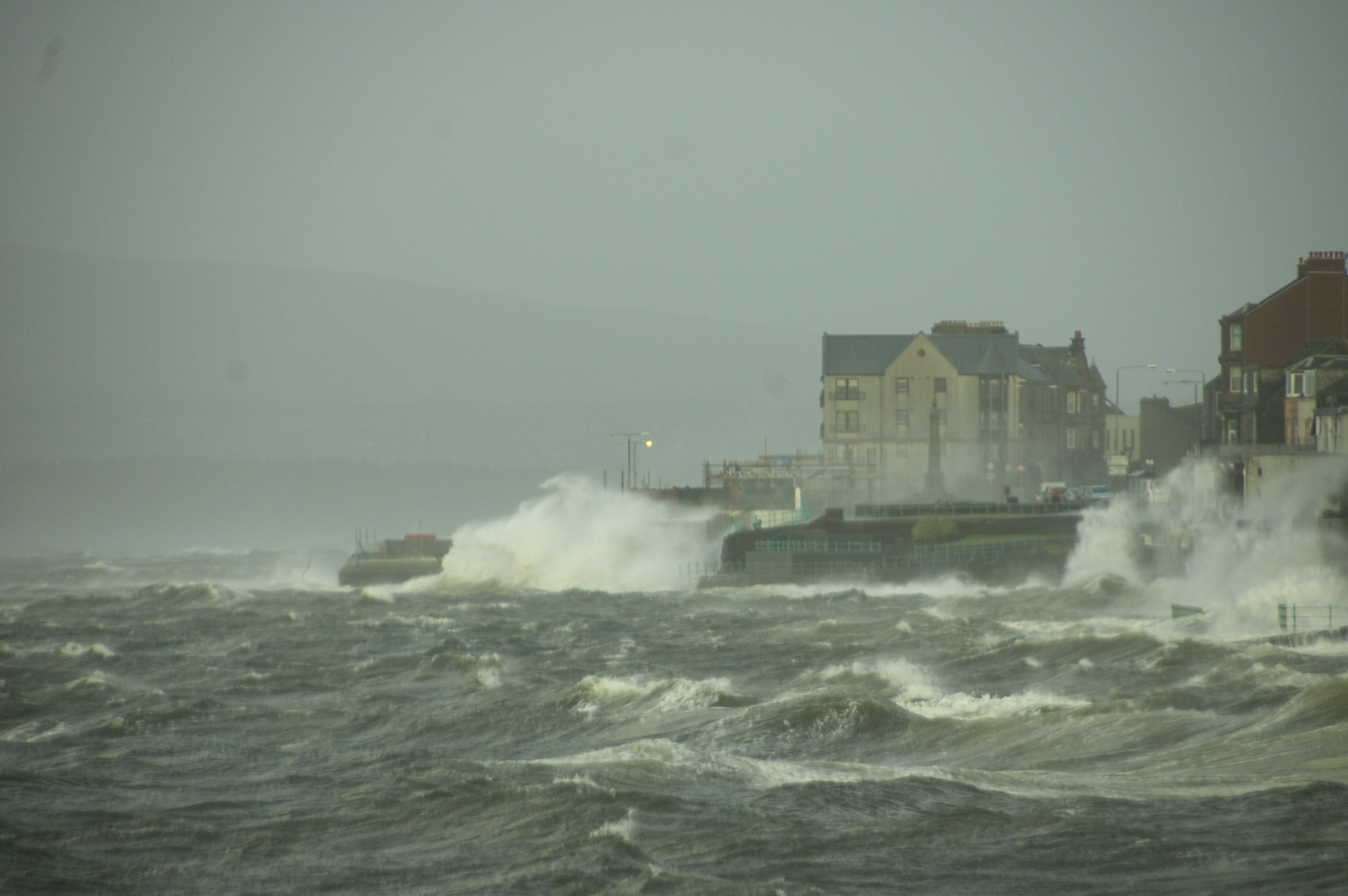
Hurricane Bawbag makes landfall at Inverclyde.

The 1968 Scotland storm is described as "Central Scotland's worst natural disaster" since records began and the worst gale in the United Kingdom. 20 people died from the storm, with 9 dead in Glasgow. 700 people were left homeless. The 1968 cost £30 million in damage at 1968 currency estimates. Cyclone Friedhelm, commonly referred to as Hurricane Bawbag in Scotland, occurred in December 2011. The storm was the worst to affect Scotland in 10 years, though a stronger storm occurred less than a month afterwards, on 3 January 2012, when a stronger storm, Cyclone Andrea, hit Scotland. The worst affected area was Southern Scotland where several weather stations reported their highest gust on record. More than 100,000 Scottish homes and businesses were left without electricity. Gusts of 102 mph (164 km/h) were recorded in Edinburgh.

In Scotland, wind storms can typically begin as early as September and last until as late as August, but can sometimes be as late as November and end earlier such as in February, as was the case during the 2021–2022 storm season. A rare red warning for wind affecting coastal areas Scotland's eastern coast was issued and impacted between 26 and 27 November 2021.

In January 2025, Storm Éowyn was anticipated to be the "most destructive" wind storm to impact Scotland in thirteen years. The Met Office issued a rare Red alert for high winds across Scotland, notably in areas such as East Ayrshire, North Ayrshire, South Ayrshire, Dumfries and Galloway, the Scottish Borders and Renfrewshire. On the evening of 23 January 2025, both the UK Government and Scottish Government issued an emergency alert to the public in preparation for the forthcoming storm. Storm Éowyn made landfall across Scotland in the morning of 24 January 2025, with many public services, such as schools, closed as a result.

=== Floods ===
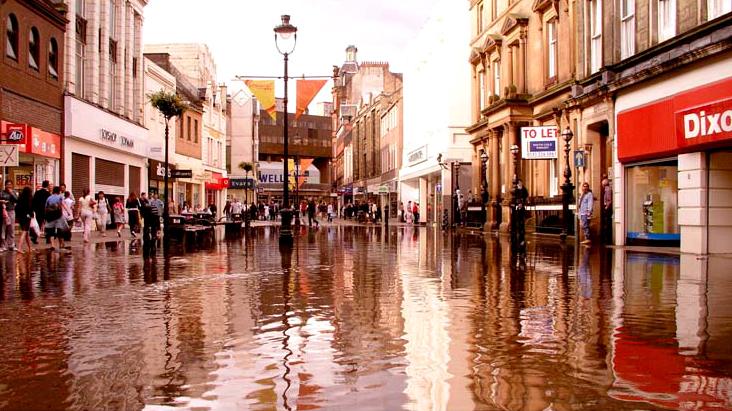
Flooding in Dundee, 2004

Flooding is a regular occurrence across Scotland, and flooding can typically happen at any period during the year. With increased levels of rainfall in Scotland, the country has seen a surge in the number of flooding incidents with 3,139 reported incidents during 2022–2023, a sharp increase from 1,617 in the previous year. The Scottish Environment Protection Agency (SEPA) is the executive non-departmental public body of the Scottish Government with responsibility for national flood forecasting, flood warning and strategic flood risk management authority.

In 1953, the flooding of the North Sea caused damage estimated at £50 million at 1953 prices, approximately £1.2 billion at 2013 prices. Considered the most devastating storm to hit Scotland in 500 years, the surge crossed between Orkney and Shetland. The storm generated coastal and inland hazards, including flooding, erosion, destruction of coastal defences, and widespread wind damage. Damage occurred throughout the country, with 19 fatalities reported. The fishing village of Crovie, Banffshire, built on a narrow strip of land along the Moray Firth, was abandoned by many, as large structures were swept into the sea.

In 2002, Glasgow was hit by a series of flash floods that occurred after thunderstorms in the Scottish Lowlands in the end of July and beginning of August 2002. The heaviest rainfall fell on the night of Tuesday, 30 July 2002. The East End of the city was worst affected, and two hundred people were evacuated from their homes in Greenfield and Shettleston on the Tuesday night. The antiquated 19th century storm drain and sewer system in that area, having received minimal investment from Scottish Water, was blamed due to its inability to deal with the high capacity of surface runoff. Many of the homes affected were in working class areas, and as a result, did not have contents insurance.

== Climate change ==
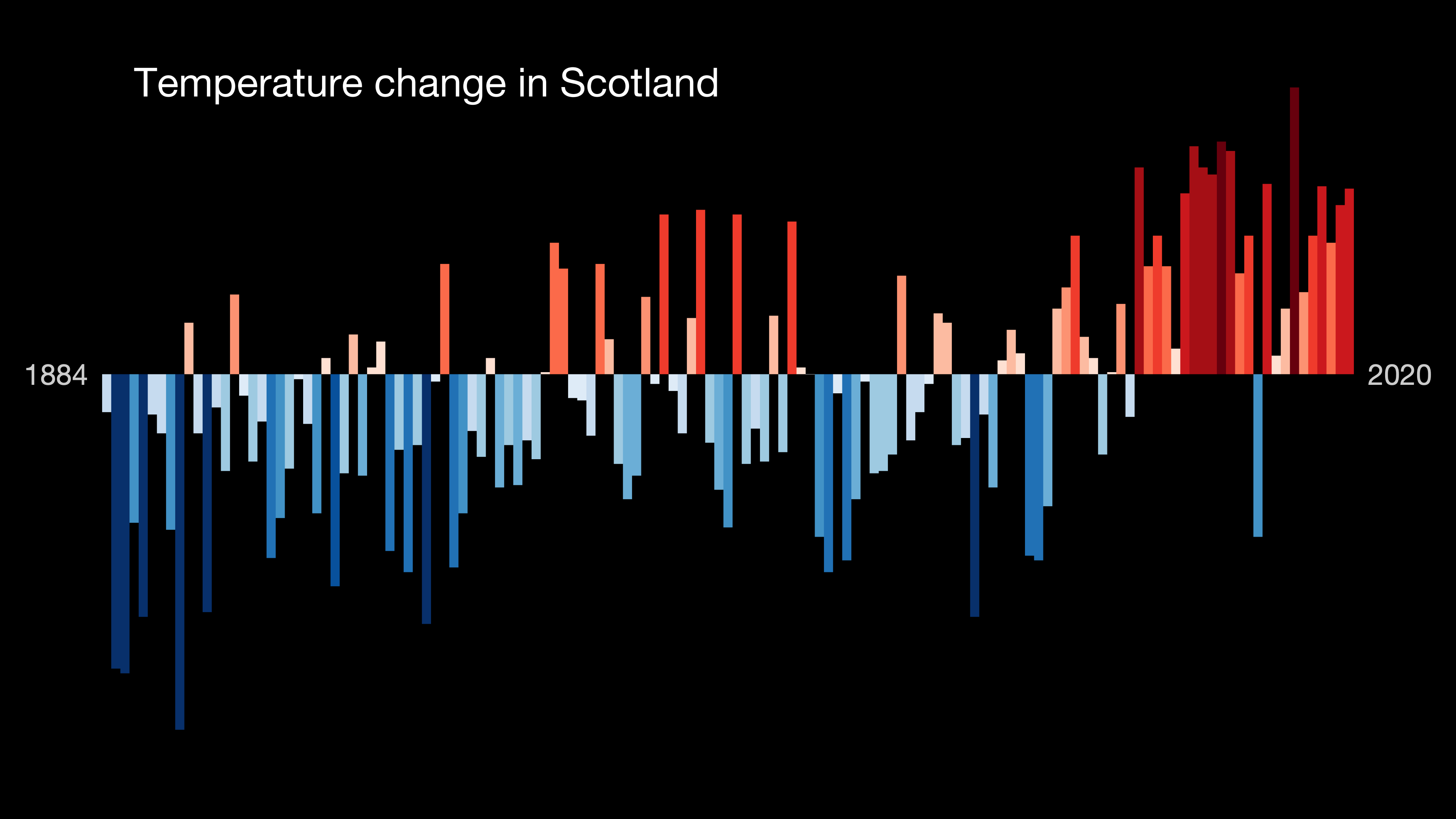
Average annual temperature anomaly in Scotland between 1884 and 2020

Climate change in Scotland is already causing a range of impacts on Scotland. 2022 was Scotland's warmest year on record with the temperature reaching 35°C in the Scottish Borders in July.

Climate change has already changed timings of spring events such as leaf unfolding, bird migration and egg-laying. Severe effects are likely to occur on biodiversity.

The mitigation of climate change and adaptation is a matter for the devolved Scottish Parliament.

Scotland's greenhouse gas emissions only accounted for 10% of the UK's emissions in 2003, when figures were published. 37% of Scottish emissions are in energy supply and 17% in transport. Between 1990 and 2007, Scottish net emissions have reduced by 18.7%. The industrial processes sector had the largest decrease, of 72% with a reduction of 48% in the public sector trailing closely behind.

The Climate Change (Scotland) Act 2009 is an Act passed by the Scottish Parliament. The Act includes an emissions target, set for the year 2050, for a reduction of at least 80% from the baseline year, 1990. The Climate Change (Scotland) Act 2009 was amended by the Climate Change (Emissions Reduction Targets) (Scotland) Act 2019, increasing the ambition of Scotland's emissions reduction targets to net zero by 2045 and revising interim and annual emissions reduction targets. Annual targets for greenhouse gas emissions must also be set, after consultation the relevant advisory bodies.

In 2020, Scotland had 12 gigawatts (GW) of renewable electricity capacity, which produced about a quarter of total UK renewable generation. In decreasing order of capacity, Scotland's renewable generation comes from onshore wind, hydropower, offshore wind, solar PV and biomass. Scotland exports much of this electricity. On 26 January 2024, the Scottish Government confirmed that Scotland generated the equivalent of 113% of Scotland's electricity consumption from renewable energy sources, making it the highest percentage figure ever recorded for renewable energy production in Scotland. It was hailed as "a significant milestone in Scotland's journey to net zero" by the Cabinet Secretary for Wellbeing Economy, Fair Work and Energy, Neil Gray. It became the first time that Scotland produced more renewable energy than it actually consumed, demonstrating the "enormous potential of Scotland's green economy" as claimed by Gray.
