= Hülsenberg =

Hülsenberg may refer to:

Mountains, hills or woodlands in Germany:

- Hülsenberg (607 m), in the Rothaargebirge in the state of North Rhine-Westphalia
- Hülsenberg (573 m), north of Obermarpe in the state of North Rhine-Westphalia
- Hülsenberg (482.0 m), near Cobbenrode in the state of North Rhine-Westphalia
- Hülsenberg (155 m), in the Harburg Hills in the state of Lower Saxony
- A woodland in the district of Diepholz in the state of Lower Saxony

People:

- Dagmar Hülsenberg (b 1940 in Sonneberg), author and, until 2006, Professor of Glass and Ceramic Technology at the Ilmenau University of Technology
- Gustav Hülsenberg (1812-1865), German wine merchant and member of parliament
