= Dagmara =

Dagmara is a Polish first name. Notable people with the given name include:

- Dagmara Domińczyk (born 1976), Polish-American actress and author
- Dagmara Grad (born 1990), Polish footballer
- Dagmara Handzlik (born 1986), Polish-born Cypriot long distance runner
- Dagmara Krzyżyńska (born 1981), Polish alpine skier
- Dagmara Nocuń (born 1996), Polish handballer
- Dagmara Wozniak (born 1988), American saber fencer

== See also ==
- Dagmar (given name)
