= Cyclone Ulli =

2011–2012 European windstorm

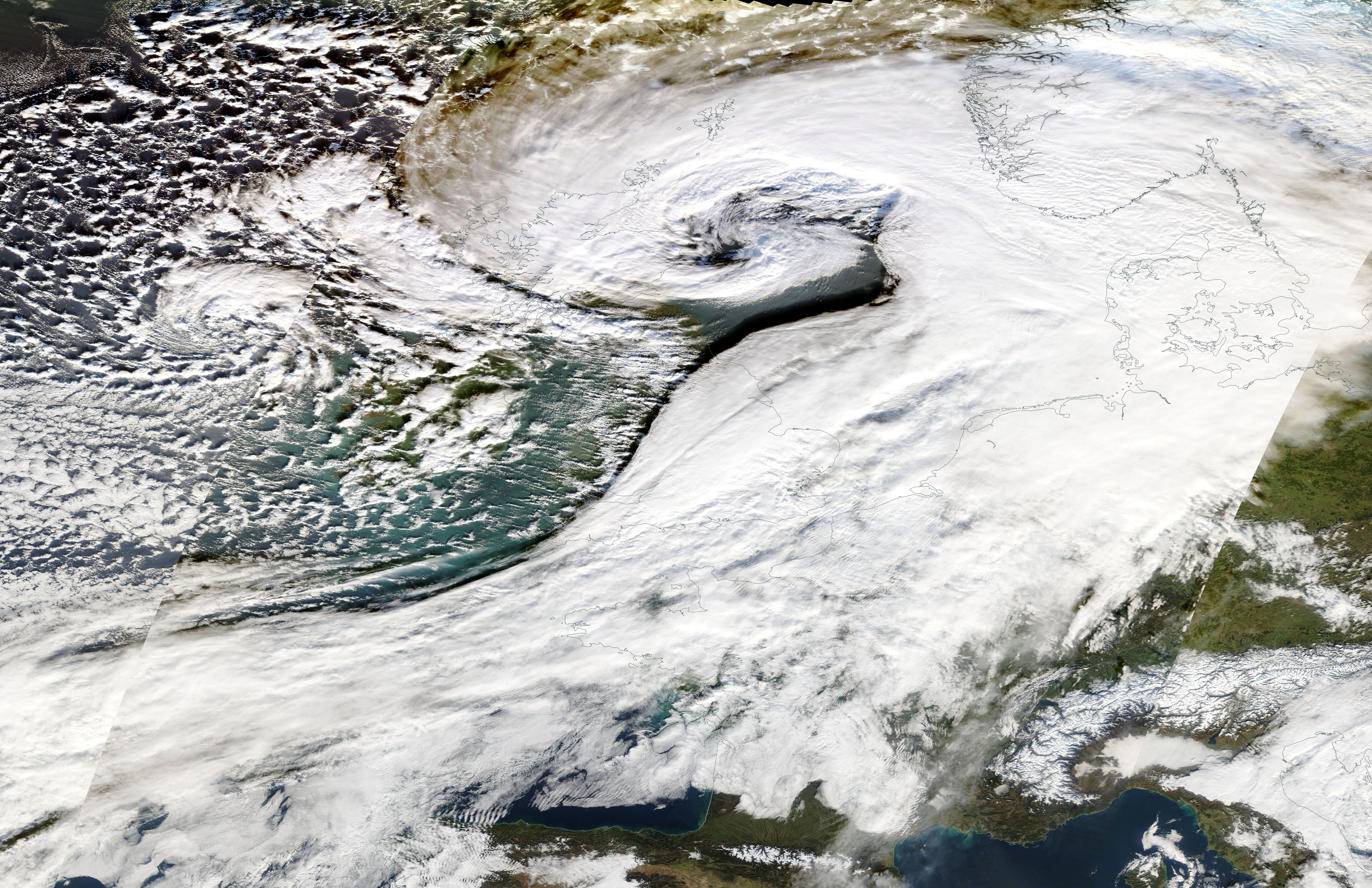
- Ulli located over the North Sea off the eastern coast of Scotland on 3 January 2012.

Meteorological history
- Formed: December 31, 2011
- Dissipated: January 7, 2012

Extratropical cyclone, Ice storm, Winter storm
- Highest gusts: 107 mph (172 km/h) in IJmuiden, Netherlands
- Lowest pressure: 952 millibars (28.1 inHg)

Overall effects
- Fatalities: 2
- Missing: 1
- Damage: $306 million (2012 USD)
- Areas affected: Eastern Canada, United Kingdom, Ireland, Netherlands, Germany, Scandinavia

Cyclone Ulli (also named Cyclone Emil by the Norwegian Meteorological Institute) was an intense European windstorm. Forming on December 31, 2011 off the coast of New Jersey, Ulli began a rapid strengthening phase on January 2 as it sped across the Atlantic. Ulli was the costliest disaster in January 2012 globally. The damage from the storm in Glasgow was also compared to a storm in 1968.

Ulli was one of many storms to affect Europe during the winter of 2011–2012. The storm clustering began in late-November when Xaver and Yoda hit the United Kingdom and Norway. In early to mid-December, Friedhelm, Hergen and Joachim hit northern Europe. Another storm, Patrick hit Scandinavia on Christmas Day. Ulli was followed by Andrea which formed the next day and struck northern Europe on 5 January.

== Meteorological history ==
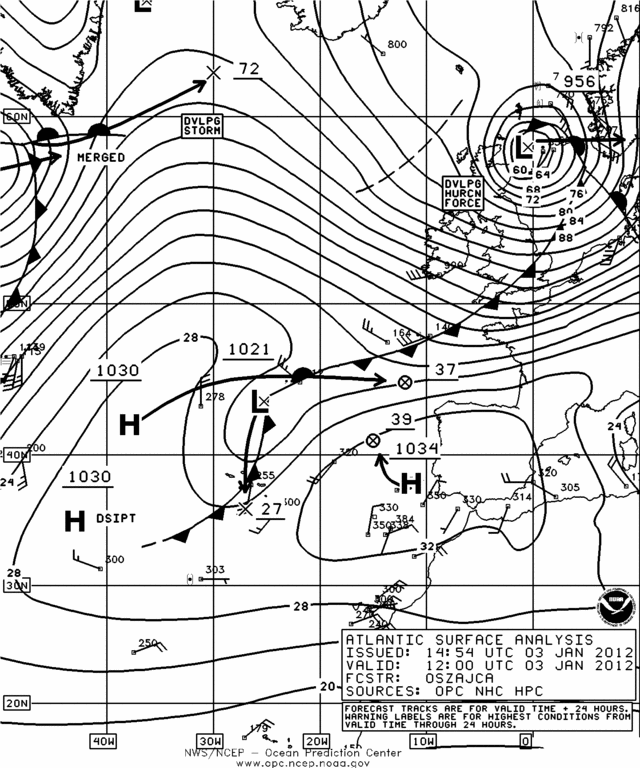
Weather map on January 3rd, 2012

The system was first noted over the United States Midwest as a surface trough. The storm moved offshore on December 31, 2011, when it was named Ulli by the Free University of Berlin. The low deepened slightly to 1,000 mb (30 inHg) by January 1, 2012 while south of Nova Scotia. By January 2, the storm system was located just east of Newfoundland. From 1800 UTC January 2 to 0000 UTC January 3, the barometric pressure of Ulli plummeted from 983 mb (29.0 inHg) to 970 mb (29 inHg). By midnight on January 3, Ulli was situated to the northwest of Scotland. The storm then made landfall on Scotland during the early morning the same day with a central pressure of 952 mb (28.1 inHg). Hours later, the storm was named Emil by the Norwegian Weather Service. By January 4, the storm was centered over southern Norway and it slowly moved across to Finland the next day. Ulli began to rapidly weaken as it stalled on January 6, and was absorbed by Windstorm Andrea on January 7. The storm has been proposed as displaying a Sting jet.

== Preparation ==
In the late hours of January 1, Met Éireann issued a national severe weather warning for Connacht and Ulster and forecasters predicting winds speeds up to 87 mph with heavy driving rain. On January 2, the Met Office issued an amber weather warning for most of Scotland for heavy snow and strong winds. Forecasters predicted wind speeds up to 80 mph, and heavy rain, leading to localized flooding. During the late hours of January 2, the European Storm Forecast Experiment (ESTOFEX) issued a Level Two warning for southeast England, the Netherlands, north Belgium, north Germany and Denmark.

== Naming ==
All low pressure areas that affect Europe are named by the Free University of Berlin. On some occasions, storms that affect Norway are named by the Norwegian Weather Service. The Free University of Berlin have six lists of names which they use each year. Every odd year they use male names, while every even year they use female names.

== Impact ==
=== United Kingdom and Ireland ===
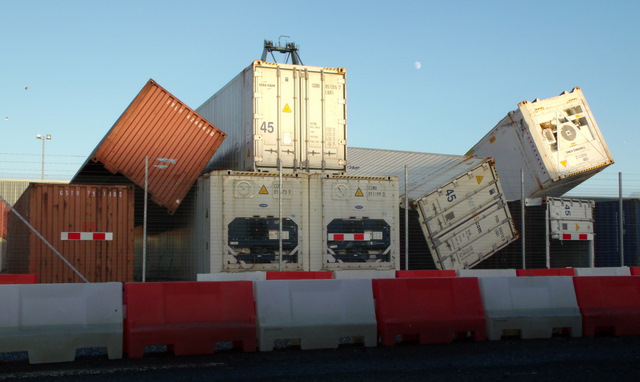
Containers blown down at Greenock Ocean Terminal in the wake of Ulli.

Prior to the passage of Ulli, many parts of the UK saw heavy squally downpours on January 2. On January 3, the Kingston, Erskine, Tay and Forth bridges were closed due to high winds. Major travel disruption which resulted in many bus, rail and ferry services being withdrawn. Winds gusted to 102 mph (164 km/h) in Edinburgh and 105 mph (169 km/h) in Malin Head. Wind gusts were higher in Great Dun Fell in the North Pennines, where winds gusted to 106 mph (171 km/h). The storm hit Scotland during a public holiday which helped reduced the number of people travelling about. A man was killed in Kent after an oak tree fell on his car, while another man was killed after being injured on board a tanker in the English Channel. A man was later reported missing in Scotland.

10,000 people were left without power in Northern Ireland due to the storm. While in Scotland approximately 140,000 homes were left without power, by 5 January the number had dropped to around 10,000. During the course of the storm over 488 weather-related incidents were reported in Strathclyde area, with 170 being reported in the Lothians, and Fife having more than a 100 reports.

A tornado, which uprooted trees and damaged roofs, touched down in Hainault, London later in the day. Another tornado was reported about 30 minutes later in Clacton-on-Sea. Epsom Downs Racecourse was evacuated after sustaining partial damage to the roof of the grandstand. Over 90 severe wind gust reports were submitted to the European Severe Weather Database. Torrential downpours affected parts of southern England and into France. The Met Office were also criticized because of the late upgrade from amber to red warnings in the Central Belt. The Scottish Environment Protection Agency (SEPA) also issued 10 flood warnings and 12 flood alerts for Scotland.

=== Netherlands and Germany ===
The Dutch Coastguard reported a meteotsunami at IJmuiden on January 3 with sea level rising and falling 1.5 m (4.9 ft) in just 30 minutes as the storm passed. In Germany on January 3, a storm warning was issued for the North Sea coast and higher altitudes. Trucks were blown over by 100 km/h (62 mph) winds in North Rhine-Westphalia. In the same area, one family had their roof blown off their house. Coastal regions were also battered by large waves with ferry passengers having to walk through flood water to disembark. An infant in a pram was also blown into a canal by strong winds near Hannover. His mother dived in to save him and both survived.

=== Denmark and Sweden ===
Ulli was the strongest storm in Denmark in seven years. Winds from the storm began to affect Jutland on the afternoon of January 3. In Skagen a 300 square metre roof of a fish processing factory was blown off. A ferry broke loose in the storm requiring two tugs to secure it, and ferry links between Denmark and Norway were cancelled. In Aalborg high winds brought down a gable wall of a student block at Construction College, toppled scaffolding, and brought down a five-story glazed aluminium staircase. The storm continued across the Kattegat to affect the Swedish west coast with power outages, blocked roads and cancellation of train services.

== Aftermath ==
Forecasters began to predict another storm that would make its way across the North Sea in the coming days, which had already named Andrea. Winds were expected to reach 140 km/h (87 mph) on Wednesday night into Thursday in Germany. German meteorologists said that the new storm looked more toxic than Ulli. They also said that Andrea was stronger than Ulli, however, the storm was weaker than Kyrill. The Met Office issued yellow warnings for wind and rain for parts of England and Wales.

Due to the unstable post-frontal environment, SkyWarn UK issued a severe thunderstorm warning for Scotland, Wales and the east coast of England for January 4 and January 5. Since dawn on January 4, hundreds of engineers were trying to restore power to over 50,000 homes in the UK.

== Highest wind gust per country ==
Country	Highest Gust	Location
Ireland	169 km/h	Malin Head
United Kingdom	171 km/h	Great Dun Fell
Netherlands	172 km/h	IJmuiden
Belgium	127 km/h	De Haan
Luxembourg	114 km/h	Wiltz
Germany	166 km/h	Schwarzwald
France	133 km/h	Calais
Denmark	167 km/h	Thyborøn
Sweden	164 km/h	Tjörn

== See also ==
- European windstorm
- List of European windstorms
- Cyclone Xaver
- Hurricane Bawbag
- Cyclone Joachim
- Give photos of the aftermath in Scotland
- gives an as live report during that day in the UK
- Cyclone Andrea
