= Pirbadet =

Water park and public pool in Trondheim, Norway

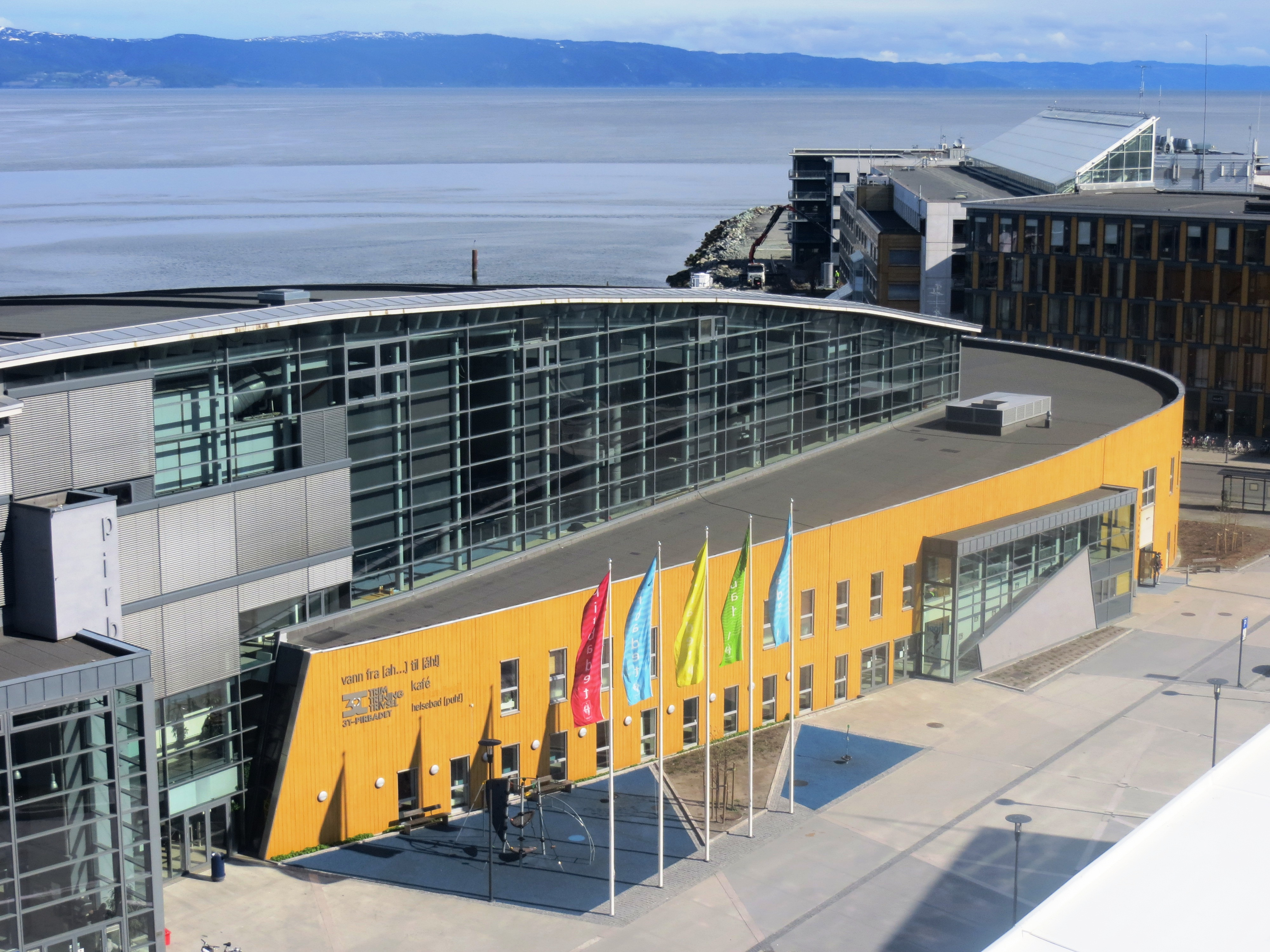
- The façade in 2013, facing north.
- Interactive map of Pirbadet
- Location: Havnegata 12, Trondheim, Trøndelag, Norway
- Coordinates: 63°26′26″N 10°24′1″E
- Theme: General
- Opened: June 15, 2001
- Operating season: All-year
- Visitors per annum: 400,000
- Area: 10,000 m^{2} (12,000 yd^{2})
- Pools: 8 pools
- Water slides: 4 water slides
- Children's areas: A single children's area
- Saunas: 4 saunas
- Website: https://www.pirbadet.no/home

Pirbadet
- Interactive map of Pirbadet
- Capacity: Circa 100 spectators
- Public transit: Pirbadet, AtB routes 21, 23, and 28; Trondheim S, Trønderbanen; Trondheim hurtigbåtterminal, AtB routes Trondheim-Kristiansund and Trondheim-Vanvikan

Pirbadet is a combined indoor water park and public pool in Trondheim, Norway, which opened in 2001. As of 2025, it is one of only two publicly open pools in Trondheim, the other being Husebybadet.

== History ==
Pirbadet was built to replace the Sentralbadet that was in downtown Trondheim.

The 50m pool hosted the 2010 and 2017 Norwegian swimming championships.

Cyclone Dagmar in December 2011 damaged the façade of the building. The insides of the water park were not adversely affected.

The park was closed for 2 weeks in August 2017 due to maintenance on the 50m pool.

On August 28, 2022, water leaked from the 50m pool down into the basement below, resulting in half-meter deep water in the basement. Only the pool and the hot tubs were affected, and the rest of the park remained open the following day.

On March 15, 2023, one person drowned in Helsebad 2, which is around 70m away from the emergency team's lookout room and in a separate room from the rest of the park.

== Attractions ==
As of 2025, the park's attractions have remained mostly the same since it opened in 2001, with 2 schooling pools, an outdoor pool, 1 additional slide, and a calm area having been the main extensions to have been added in the time since.

=== Pools ===
- A 50m 8-lane pool (6 lanes if excluding those that border on the pool sides).
  - Diving heights by the 50m pool: 10m platform, 7m platform, 5m platform, 3m platform, 3m springboard, 1m springboard.
  - A bench seating stand next to the pool, accessed by a door past a corridor on the 2nd floor, and not through the water park itself. Capacity unclear, around 100.
- A gradually sloped wave pool with a climbing wall on its back end. The waves are started on the hour and for around 10 minutes at a time.
- Ungdoms-basseng (lit. 'Teen pool'): A 31°C pool with staircases leading into it. Contains periodically turned on jet showers and has a short circular watercurrent lap.
- Velværebasseng (lit. 'Well-being pool'): A 34°C irregularly shaped pool looking out towards the Trondheim Fjord.
- Helsebad 2 (lit. 'Health Bath 2'): 12.6 by 9.6 metres (13.8 yd × 10.5 yd) warm pool intended for light exercise. Often used for water gym sessions. Contains an accessibility slope to allow wheelchairs to enter and exit the pool. Open to general visitors when there are no water gyms going on.
- Opplæringsbasseng 1 and Opplæringsbasseng 2 (lit. 'Schooling pool 1/2'): 12.5 by 8 metres (13.7 yd × 8.7 yd) pools designed for swimming courses, primarily for school classes. Open to general visitors on weekends and on most nights. They are numbered for which floor they are on.
- Utebasseng (lit. 'Outdoor pool'): Outdoors on the 2nd floor. Accessed by a door next to Opplæringsbasseng 2.

=== Slides ===
- Two medium-intensity slides, accessed by a staircase in the corner by Ungdoms-basseng.
- A broad, low-intensity slide next to Ungdoms-basseng, leading into a deep landing pool.
- A very short slide in the children section.

=== Other ===
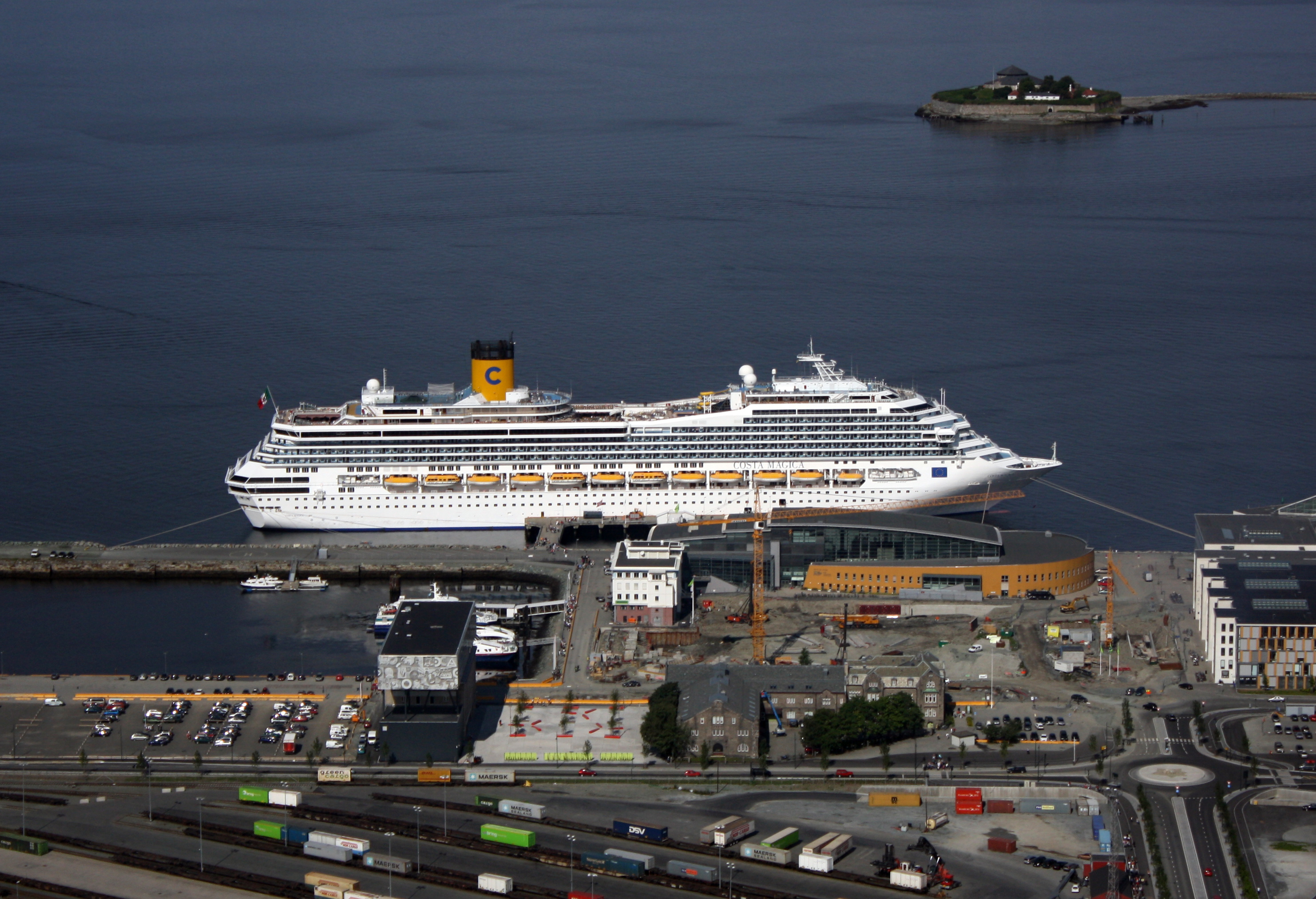
Costa Magica docking next to Pirbadet in 2011.

- 3 hot tubs.
- Various saunas (Standard, steam, and infrared).
- 2 bathtubs with very cold water.
- Jafs fastfood restaurant.
- 3T-Treningssenter gym. Not included in the regular water park ticket.

Owing to its position on the shore of Trondheim's Brattøra pier district, visiting cruise ships often dock very close to the northern glasswalls.
