= Cyclone Andrea =

2012 European windstorm

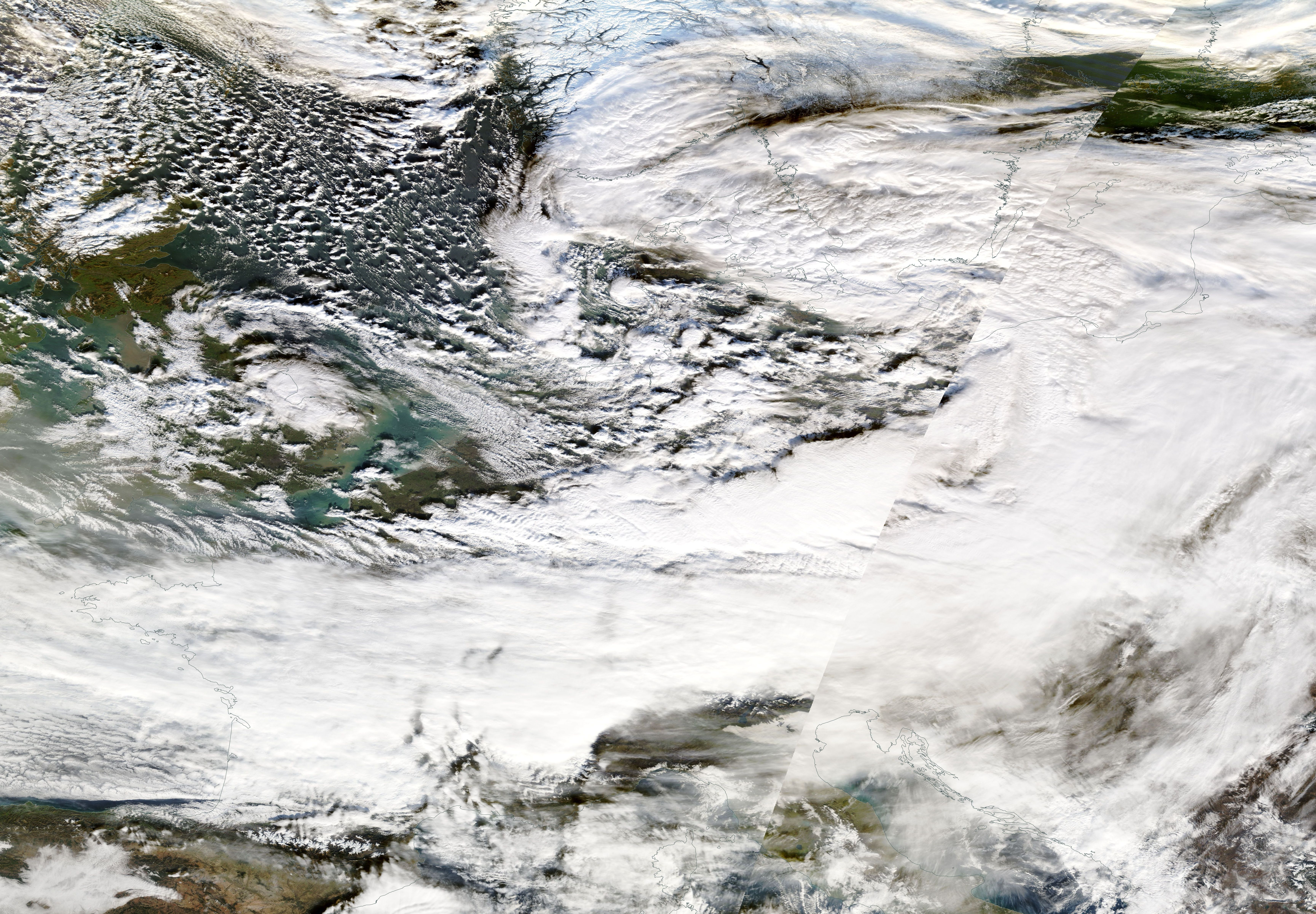
- Andrea over northern Europe on 5 January 2012.

Meteorological history
- Formed: 3 January 2012
- Dissipated: 9 January 2012

European windstorm, Extratropical cyclone, Winter storm
- Highest gusts: 176 km/h (109 mph) at Feldberg and Zugspitze
- Lowest pressure: 964 mb (28.5 inHg)

Overall effects
- Fatalities: 1
- Damage: $350 million (2012 USD)
- Areas affected: Iceland, Ireland, United Kingdom, Netherlands, Belgium, France, Germany, Denmark, Austria, Switzerland

Cyclone Andrea was an intense European windstorm that affected western and central Europe in early January 2012.

== Meteorological history ==
Closely following Cyclone Ulli, Andrea, the first named storm of 2012 formed southwest of Iceland on 3 January, moving down into the North Sea, and affecting the United Kingdom, Netherlands, Denmark, and Germany. The storm impacted Western Europe through 9 January before dissipating.

== Naming ==
All low-pressure areas that affect Europe are named by the Free University of Berlin. The Free University of Berlin have six lists of names which they use each year. Every even year they use female names, while every odd year they use male names. Just as Storm Friedhelm that occurred the preceding December had been dubbed Hurricane Bawbag in Scotland, Storm Andrea was dubbed Hurricane Fannybaws because of the obvious comparison that could be made between two severe storms occurring close together.

== Impacts ==
=== British Isles ===
Across the UK 100,000 homes were left without electricity. Widespread damage occurred in Nottinghamshire, with more than 900 homes left without power. The roofs of two houses were blown off in Lincolnshire, with many roads closed and fallen trees. The worst affected area was Southern Scotland where several weather stations reported their highest gust on record. More than 100,000 Scottish homes and businesses were left without electricity. Gusts of 102 mph (164 km/h) were recorded in Edinburgh.

=== European North Sea and Baltic Sea coasts ===
==== Netherlands ====
As the storm crossed the North Sea, the combination of low pressure, shallow waters and high winds piling water against the coast led to a storm surge that developed along the coast. Across Europe's North Sea coast, the storm surge and heavy rains led to flooding. The first week of January 2012 brought 70–90 mm (2.8–3.5 in) of rain in the Netherlands, the usual amount for the whole of January. Storm Andrea brought strong winds (up to force 9) thunder and hail Due to the high sea levels, the heavy rainfall could not be discharged as easily from the land without the risk of coastal flooding.

In the West coast of the Netherlands, high water was recorded at 2.30 m (7.5 ft) above normal at the Hook of Holland, with Rotterdam expecting sea levels 2.48 m (8.1 ft) above normal. Operations in the port of Rotterdam were limited with eleven ships unable to leave, and two unable to enter. Pilot services for vessels coming into the port were also restricted. Most flights were disrupted at Amsterdam Schiphol airport. Ferry services were also withdrawn to the Islands off the Dutch coast.

Dyke leaking in northern Netherlands in danger of breaching saw residents evacuated by the army and police

==== Germany ====
In Nord Rhein Westphalia the Rhine rose to flood levels close to Cologne, with vessels restricted to the middle of the river and flood defences being deployed. The Federal Maritime and Hydrographic Agency (BSH) issued warnings for expected storm surges along the Northern German coast in North Frisia and Hamburg. Trees fell onto power lines in the state of Saxony, leaving thousands without power, also in middle Saxony and Bautzen. In Regensburg the roof of a furniture store was badly damaged. Damage to the English Garden in Munich. A local train is derailed by a fallen tree at Reken in Münsterland, four passengers and the driver escaped without harm. Railway was closed after a tree fell on a train in Geltendorf, Augsburg.

==== Belgium, France ====
In Nord Pas De Calais 5800 homes were left without power. In the port of Calais the SeaFrance ferry Berlioz slipped its moorings and crossed the harbour before striking the Ile de Batz, a cable laying ship belonging to Alcatel during winds of 110 km/h (68 mph) according to the harbourmaster. Also in Étaples a wind turbine lost two blades. The Belgian met office issued a code orange warning for the whole country and the Øresund Bridge was also closed between Denmark and Sweden due to the storm. In Belgium the roof of a school blown off in Quenast, Walloon Brabant. Liège Airport experienced flight delays with 2 cargo planes being forced to divert to other airports. Rising river levels were reported across the country.

=== Central Europe and European Alps ===
In Upper Franconia, Germany a 43-year-old man died following a frontal collision, according to police after a gust pushed the car into oncoming traffic. In Ostallgäu, Bavaria lightning struck a 15th-century church tower, setting it on fire. The strong winds and snow thwarted attempts to stop the fire and the tower eventually collapsed. In Switzerland the storm blocked railways and disrupted flights at Zurich airport, with Central Switzerland and the Zurich wine growing areas worst affected. 83 km/h (52 mph) gusts were recorded close to the city of Zurich on 5 January. At higher elevations of the Great St Bernard Pass on the French border wind speeds of 210 km/h (130 mph) were measured. The storm brought heavy snow and avalanche warnings to western Austria. Unusually heavy snows also buried towns and blocked roads in Austria's western Tyrol and Vorarlberg federal-states leading to avalanche warnings. Meanwhile, authorities were searching for a missing 15-year-old skier near Innsbruck. Between 5 and 9 January, 216 cm (85 in) of snow fell in Hochfilzen and 177 cm (70 in) in Langen am Arlberg. The Austrian national weather service reported that such large snowfalls occur approximately once a decade. In the French Alps 20,000 homes were left without power as high winds and snow caused blackouts, with Haute-Savoie, Isère, and Savoy departments particularly affected.

=== Further afield ===
Forecasters in France warned that the storm would continue south to Corsica in the Mediterranean, with both departments being put on orange alert by Meteo France. All flights to the island were suspended on the afternoon of 5 January.

== Aftermath ==
Austrian rescue workers abandoned the search for a missing 15-year-old skier on 13 January, despite the best efforts of sniffer dogs, heat sensors, radar, and 450 personnel. The search was hampered by severe risk of avalanches in the area due to the heavy snow. Hundreds of tourists were trapped in the Austrian resort of Ischgl after police closed the resort following two avalanches. Lifts were turned off and army helicopters were called to airlift inexperienced skiers to safety. Interpolis, a subsidiary of the biggest Dutch insurance company, Achmea, stated that it had received about 2 million euros in claims for wind and rain damage in the first week of 2012, which includes damages relating to Cyclone Ulli.

== Highest wind gust per country ==
Country	Highest Gust	Location
Iceland	151 km/h	Neskaupstadur
Ireland	149 km/h	Wicklow
United Kingdom	172 km/h	Dundee
Netherlands	119 km/h	Terschelling
Belgium	116 km/h	Elsenborn
Germany	176 km/h	Feldberg
France	154 km/h	Lunéville
Luxembourg	120 km/h	Remich
Switzerland	168 km/h	Oberwald
Austria	176 km/h	Zugspitze
Liechtenstein	155 km/h	Eschen
Denmark	170 km/h	Anholt
Sweden	164 km/h	Öckerö
Norway	150 km/h	Gladstad

== See also ==
- List of European windstorms
- Cyclone Xaver
- Hurricane Bawbag
- Cyclone Joachim
- Cyclone Ulli
