= Dagmar =

Dagmar may refer to:

== People ==
- Dagmar (given name), a feminine Scandinavian and German given name
- Berthe Dagmar (1884–1934), French film actress
- Dagmar (actress) (1921–2001), main stage name of American actress Virginia Ruth Egnor
- Dagmar (Puerto Rican entertainer) (born 1955), Puerto Rican entertainer Dagmar Rivera

== Places ==
- County of Dagmar, Queensland, Australia
- Dagmar, Montana, United States, an unincorporated community
- Dagmar Ski Resort in Uxbridge, Ontario

== Other uses ==
- 1669 Dagmar (1934 RS), a main-belt asteroid
- Cyclone Dagmar, which caused severe damage in Norway in 2011
- Dagmar (automobile), sports version of the Crawford automobile
- Dagmar bumpers, a slang term for conical styling elements in 1950s automobile bumpers and grilles
- DAGMAR marketing, an advertising model
- Dagmar (novel), a novel by Zlatko Topčić
- The Dagmar, a fictional public house on the BBC Soap opera EastEnders
- Queen Dagmar, mother of the protagonist Bean in the animation series Disenchantment
