= Hurricane Bawbag =

Extratropical cyclone in Scotland in 2011

Hurricane Bawbag Cyclone Friedhelm
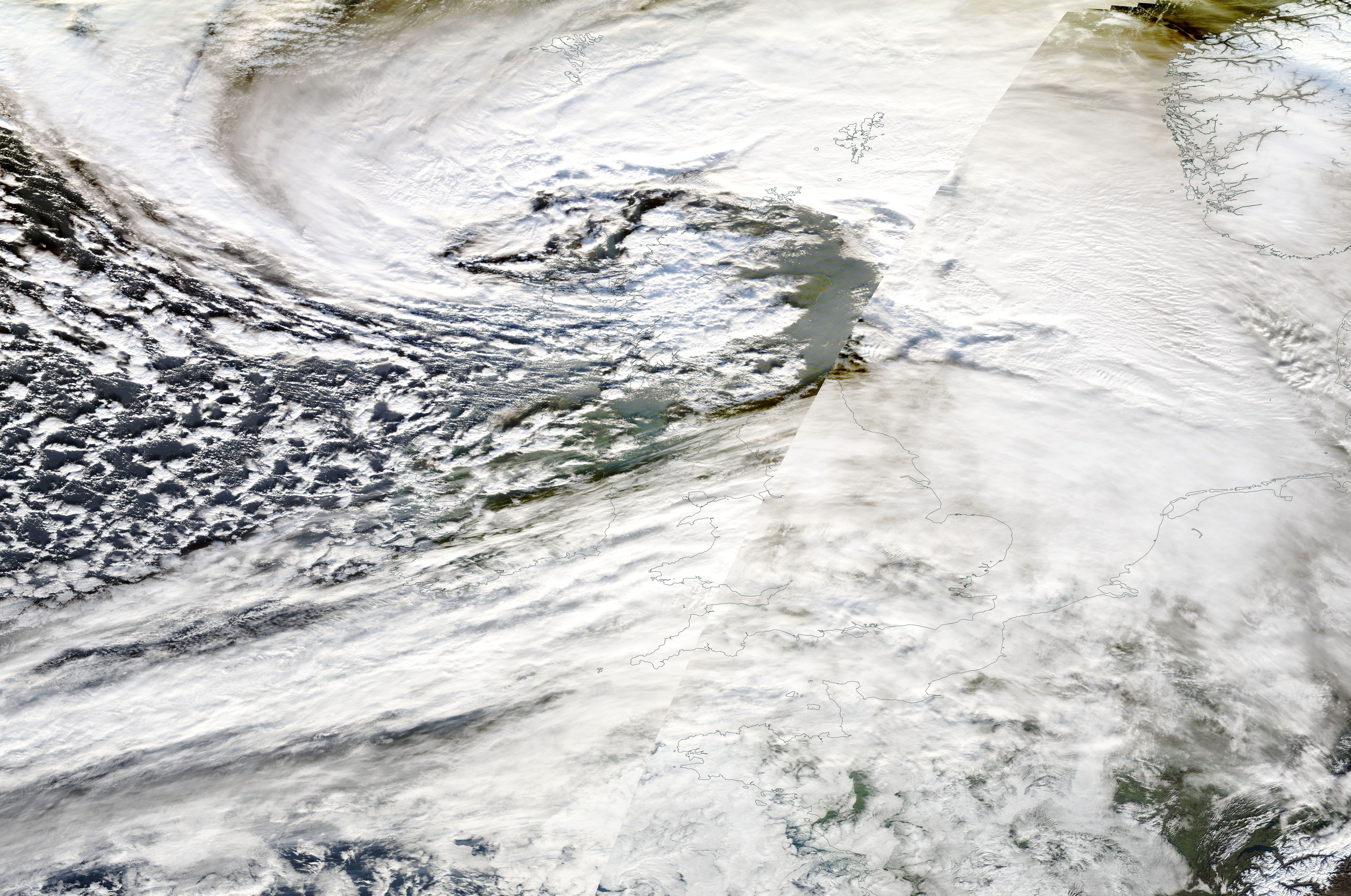
- Friedhelm crossing the British Isles on 8 December

Meteorological history
- Formed: 7 December 2011
- Dissipated: 13 December 2011

Extratropical cyclone
- Highest winds: 188 km/h (117 mph) at Cairngorm Summit
- Highest gusts: 265 km/h (165 mph) at Cairngorm Summit
- Lowest pressure: 956 hPa (mbar); 28.23 inHg

Overall effects
- Fatalities: 1
- Areas affected: British Isles, Scandinavia

Hurricane Bawbag, also known as Cyclone Friedhelm (Note: The official name for this storm, designated by the Free University of Berlin, is Cyclone Friedhelm; however, the most common name given to the storm, particularly by media in the United Kingdom, was Hurricane Bawbag. The storm was not, however, an actual hurricane; rather, it was a powerful European windstorm with hurricane-force winds.) was an intense extratropical cyclone which brought hurricane-force winds to Scotland at the beginning of December 2011. The storm also brought prolonged gales and rough seas to the rest of the British Isles, as well as parts of Scandinavia. On 8 December, winds reached up to 165 mph (266 km/h) at elevated areas, with sustained wind speeds of up to 80 mph (130 km/h) reported across populous areas. The winds uprooted trees and resulted in the closure of many roads, bridges, schools and businesses. Overall, the storm was the worst to affect Scotland in 10 years, though a stronger storm occurred less than a month afterwards, on 3 January 2012. Although the follow-up storm was more intense, the winter of 2011–12 is usually remembered for Bawbag in Scotland.

== Naming ==
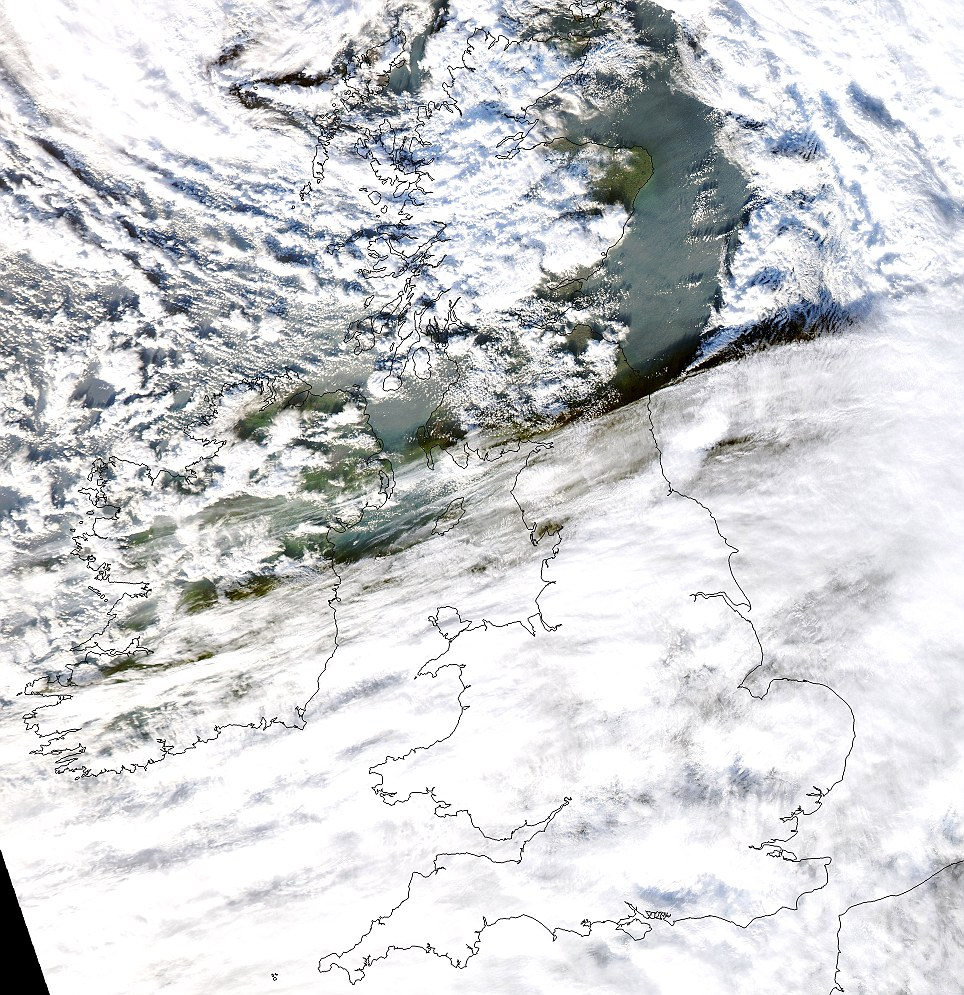
Another image of Cyclone Friedhelm striking the British Isles

The Free University of Berlin names low-pressure systems affecting Europe and gave the name Friedhelm to this storm. In Scotland, the storm was dubbed Hurricane Bawbag, the term bawbag being a Scots word for "scrotum", which is also used as an insult or as a jocular term of endearment.

The name sparked a trending topic on Twitter, which became one of the top trending hashtags worldwide. Stirling Council also used the Twitter tag. Rob Gibson, the convener of the Scottish Parliamentary Environment Committee, was the first politician to use the term on national television.

== Meteorological history ==
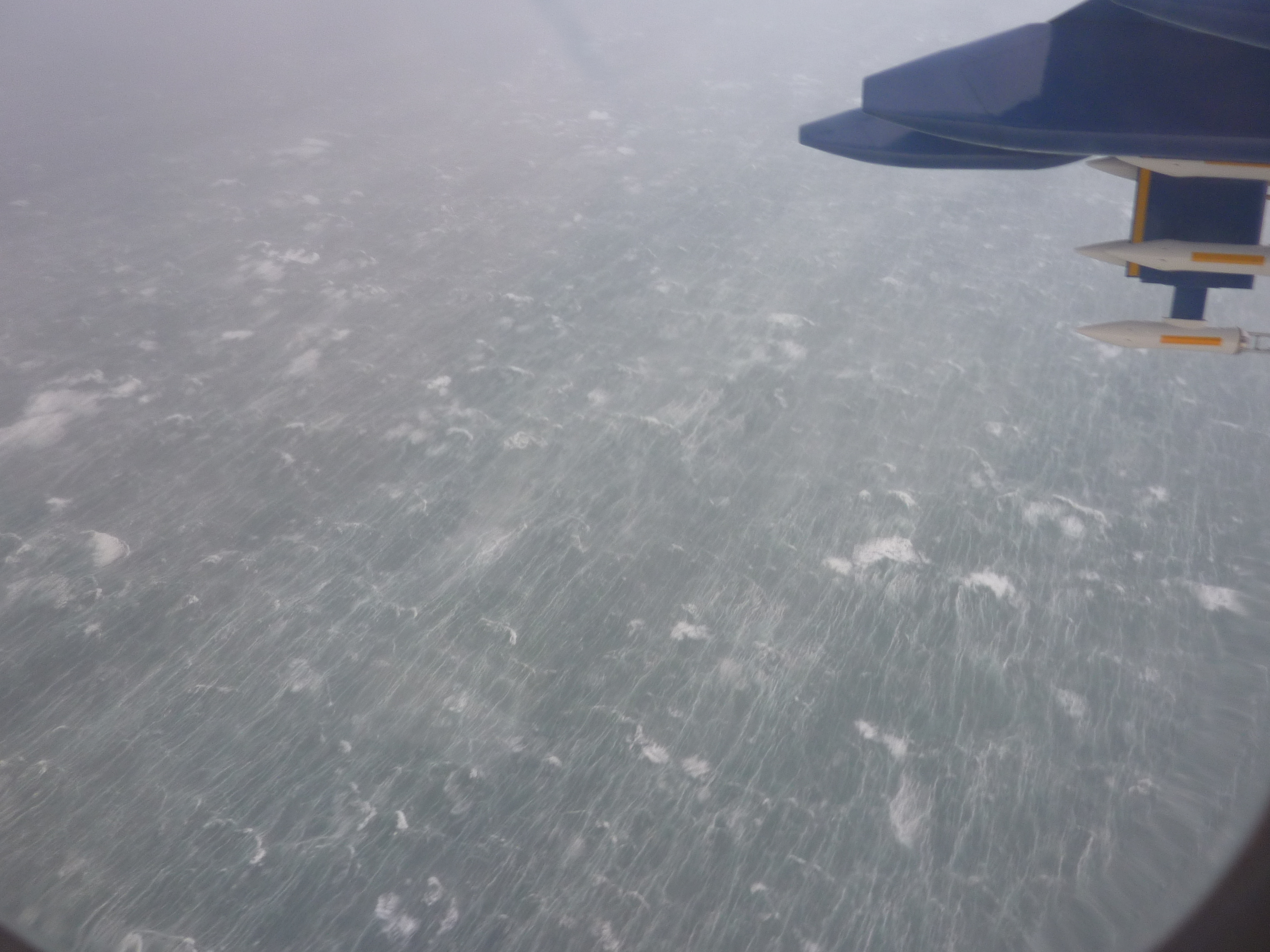
Churning seas off the west coast of Scotland photographed from the FAAM research aircraft at about 450 m (1,480 ft) above sea level.

At 00:00 UTC on 8 December 2011, the Met Office noted a strong mid-latitude cyclone along the polar front to the west of Scotland. The polar front supported multiple cold fronts moving southeastward through the Atlantic toward mainland Europe, as well as an eastward-moving warm front approaching Great Britain. In conjunction with strong high pressure to the south, an extremely tight pressure gradient developed along the deep low and produced a large area of high winds.

Because of the high temperature gradient between the warm and cold air masses, the cyclone underwent a phase of explosive deepening. By 08:00 UTC, the low had attained a minimum barometric pressure of 977 hPa (28.9 inHg), bringing gale-force winds to much of western Great Britain. The minimum pressure further dipped to 957 hPa (28.3 inHg) around 12:00 UTC, with maximum sustained winds of at least 105 mph (169 km/h) observed at the surface. An overall pressure drop of 44 hPa (1.3 inHg) was observed over just 24 hours, which combined with the extreme winds earned it the label "weather bomb" by meteorologists. A FAAM research aircraft had intercepted the storm on several occasions as part of the DIAMET research project, providing valuable data on its wind profile, temperature and humidity.

By 9 December, the low had crossed Great Britain and moved into the North Sea toward western Scandinavia. The weakening occluded portion of the low—located along its centre—produced south-southeasterly gale-force winds across the peninsula. Further north, a large area of heavy snowfall and rough winds developed, while the heaviest rains occurred to the south of the centre. It passed through Sweden with hurricane-force gusts, though its winds and rainfall weakened significantly as it moved over Finland on 10 December. The storm persisted for another three days, before dissipating on 13 December.

== Preparations and warnings ==
On 7 December, the Met Office issued a red weather warning—its highest warning—for the Central Belt of Scotland. This was the first time the Met Office had ever issued a red alert for wind for the United Kingdom. They informed the public to take action and urged them to listen to police warnings.

By 08:00 UTC on 8 December, all schools in the west of Scotland had been closed, while remaining schools in the east were told to close at lunchtime. In addition, many tertiary centres of education, such as Edinburgh University, Glasgow University who were taking exams on that day, Glasgow Caledonian University and University of the West of Scotland halted their operations as a safety precaution. Also closed were public museums, galleries, sports centres, and many council buildings and libraries. The Police in Scotland advised the public not to travel, and the Tay, Forth, Skye and Erskine bridges were closed to all traffic. Officials feared widespread structural damage to roofs and weak buildings, resulting in the closure of several tourist attractions in central Scotland, including Edinburgh Castle and Princes Street Gardens.

== Impacts ==
The storm brought gales to much of the British Isles and large parts of the Scandinavian Peninsula, causing widespread power outages and traffic disruptions. The highest winds occurred in Scotland, where hurricane-force winds battered coastal structures and uprooted trees. Additionally, heavy rainfall flooded some locations in England, Wales and Sweden. Despite the severity of its winds, the storm left no deaths in its wake.

The storm was classified Hurricane-force 12 on the Beaufort scale. This is the highest classification on the modern scale.

=== Scotland ===
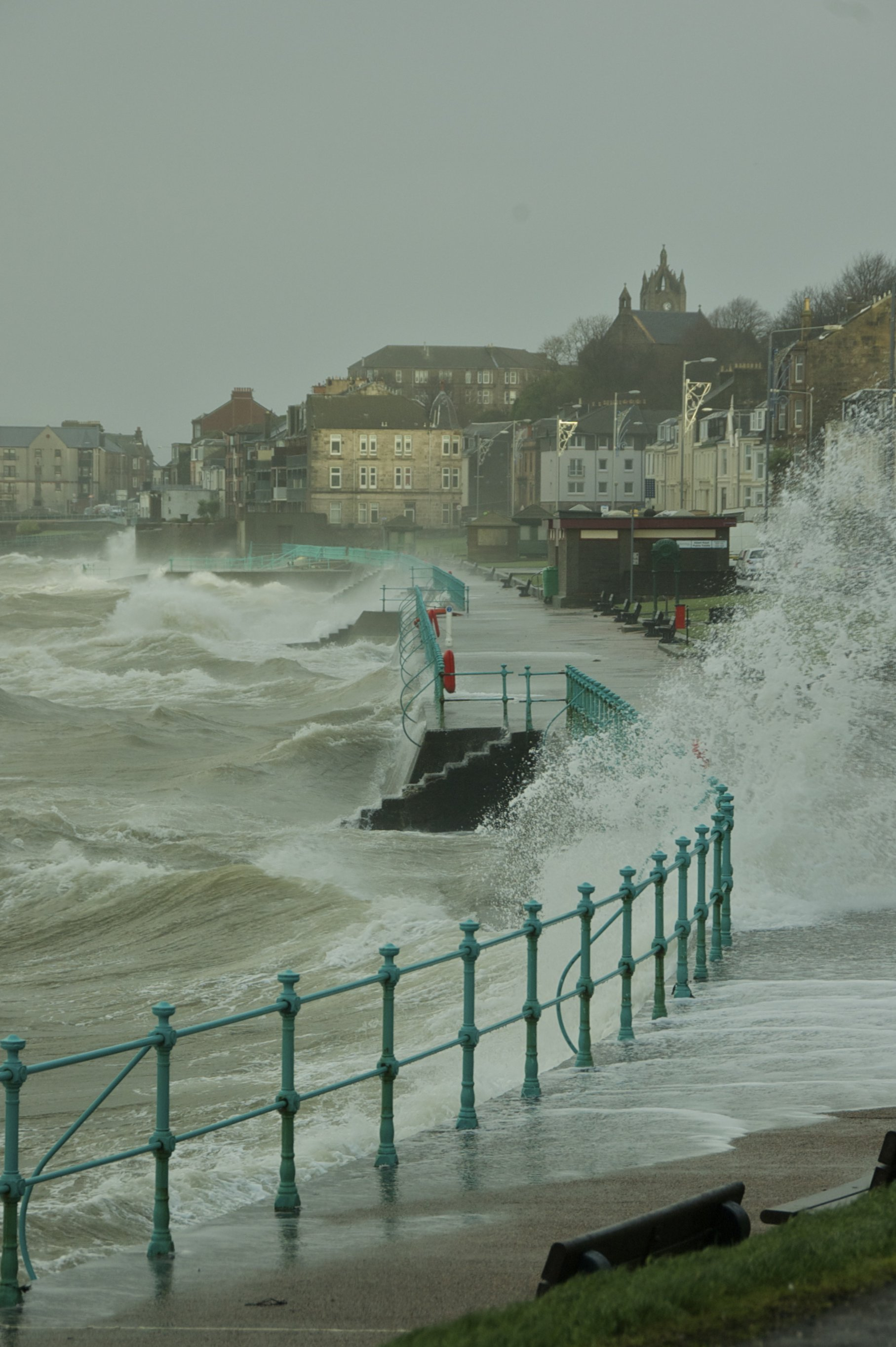
Large waves from the storm at the Ashton area in Gourock, Inverclyde

The cyclone brought hurricane-force winds to large portions of Scotland through much of 8 December. The summit of Cairn Gorm recorded a gust speed of 165 mph (266 km/h), though sustained winds at the surface averaged 105 mph (169 km/h) and 80 mph (130 km/h) in populous areas. The high winds generated large waves along coastlines and blew trees and debris into power lines. About 150,000 Scottish households lost power, 70,000 of which still had not had their electricity returned by nightfall. Two hospitals, The Belford and Victoria Hospital, suffered power and telephone service cuts.

The storm disrupted many of Scotland's public transport services, ScotRail operated a reduced timetable across all parts of the country as a result, and routes from Edinburgh to Aberdeen, Perth and Dundee were suspended. Sixty-four passengers on a train running on the West Highland Line were stranded, near Crianlarich, after the line was forced to close In some areas buses ran in place of trains due to line problems. Glasgow Airport cancelled 37 flights, and Edinburgh Airport 21 flights. Ferry services in the Western Isles were also affected, with the majority being cancelled. Bus operators in the Central Belt withdrew double-decker buses from operation after the Scottish Government advised all high sided vehicles not to travel and a number of buses were blown over.

In the North Sea, the Petrojarl Banff, a floating production storage and offloading vessel carrying 4,400 tonnes (4,900 short tons) of oil, and the Apollo Spirit, which has 96,300 tonnes (106,200 short tons) on board, lost tension in some of their anchors as they were battered by the hurricane-force winds. The Apollo Spirit lost tension in one of its eight anchors, while five of the ten anchors supporting the Banff went slack.

Strathclyde Police reported that they received calls for 500 weather-related incidents during the course of the day. In Campbeltown, Falkirk and Stirling a number of streets were closed after slates and chimneys fell from roofs. Jody and Iain’s naval flagpole in Rosyth was destroyed by Bawbag. High winds toppled a school bus travelling along the A737 near Dalry, North Ayrshire. A wind turbine near Ardrossan burst into flames in the high winds. Additionally, many Christmas lights in Aberdeen were blown down. In Glasgow, the winds caused the River Clyde to burst its banks and overflow.

=== Ireland ===
The low produced near hurricane-force gusts across the island of Ireland, with the highest winds reported along Northern Ireland coastal areas. The worst of the storm occurred in County Donegal, where gusts neared 140 km/h (87 mph). In Dublin, the winds uprooted trees, knocked over bins and blew debris through streets. Some homes lost power during the storm, but the cuts did not cause significant disruption. Rivers rose in the winds and many burst their banks, causing light flooding across minor roads. A few buildings sustained minor wind damage to their roofs. A bridge connecting the Fanad Peninsula to Carrigart was closed to vehicles. Rail and ferry operators suspended their services, leaving passengers stranded.

=== England and Wales ===
The storm had a significant impact on parts of the North of England. There was flooding in Cumbria near Windermere, which left some cars adrift in water. High winds prompted the cancellation of train services as far south as Newcastle. In North Yorkshire heavy rain and snow melt combined to cause widespread flooding in Swaledale leading to closure of several roads and the partial collapse of the bridge over the River Swale at Grinton. A search and rescue helicopter from RAF Kinloss was scrambled to rescue those caught in the flooding.

Storm conditions and heavy rain hit Wales, while hurricane-force winds were confined to the northern regions. Aberdaron, on the tip of the Llŷn Peninsula, recorded a gust of 81 mph (130 km/h), which was the highest for the country. In Swansea, winds of up to 70 mph (110 km/h) were reported. Flood alerts were also issued for several rivers in Wales due to the high rainfall.

=== Scandinavia ===
The Swedish Meteorological Institute issued a class two warning. In Gothenburg, roads and some cellars were submerged, and the Älvsborg Bridge and Götatunneln were closed due to high winds. The winds damaged structures and left over 14,000 customers without power.

== Aftermath ==
Over 70,000 Scottish customers remained without electricity on 9 December, and by 10 December that number had dropped to 2,000. Several schools were shut for a second day, including all schools in Orkney, Caithness and the north coast of Sutherland in the Highlands, while some schools were closed in Aberdeenshire, Angus, Argyll and the Isle of Bute, Shetland, Stirling and the Western Isles.

== In popular culture ==
"Hurricane Bawbag" provides the background and part of the plot mechanism for Irvine Welsh's novel A Decent Ride (2015).

== See also ==
- Cyclone Ulli
- Cyclone Joachim
- List of European windstorms
