= Dagmar (given name) =

- Gender: Female and Male
- Name day: 26 November

Origin
- Origin: Old Norse; Old Saxon
- Meaning: dagr (day) mær (maid) mari (famous)
- Region of origin: Fennoscandia; Germany

Other names
- Related names: Dragomira

Dagmar is a Scandinavian given name. It is usually female (but occasionally also male). The name derives from the Old Norse name (Dagmær), dagr meaning "day", and mær meaning "daughter", "mother" and "maiden" (or mari meaning "famous" and "powerful" in Old Saxon). Outside of Scandinavia, Dagmar is also used in Austria, the Czech Republic, Estonia, Germany, the Netherlands, Poland (Dagmara), Slovakia and Switzerland. In Greece (Δάμαρις) also, even though rarely; it is a Saint of the Orthodox church and it is said to be the first Christian woman of Athens, following the visit of Apostle Paul to Athens in 51 AD.

== Nicknames ==
Nicknames of Dagmar are Dagie, Dagmarka, Dasha, Dáša, Digi, and Mara (in Czech); Dagi and Daggi (in German).

== Notable people ==
- Dagmar (1921–2001), American actress
- Dagmar of Bohemia (1186–1212), Queen Consort of Denmark, wife of King Valdemar II of Denmark
- Maria Feodorovna (Dagmar of Denmark) (1847–1928), Empress Consort of Russia and mother of Emperor Nicholas II
- Princess Dagmar of Denmark (1890–1961), daughter of Frederick VIII of Denmark and his wife, Princess Louise of Sweden and Norway
- Dagmar Berghoff (born 1943), German radio and television presenter, first female newsreader on German TV
- Dagmar Berne (1865–1900), Australian medical doctor; first female student to study medicine in Australia
- Dagmar Bláhová (born 1949), Czech actress
- Dagmar Braun Celeste (born 1941), former First Lady of Ohio
- Dagmar Burešová (19 October 1929 – 30 June 2018) Czech lawyer and politician
- Dagmar Dahlgren (1880–1951), American singer and motion picture actress
- Dagmara Domińczyk (born 1976), Polish American actress
- Dagmar Freuchen-Gale (1907–1991), Danish fashion illustrator, author and editor
- Dagmar Godowsky (1897–1975), American silent film actress
- Dagmar Hagelin (1959–1977), Swedish-Argentinian girl who disappeared during Argentina's dirty war
- Dagmar Hase (born 1969), German swimmer
- Dagmar Havlová (born 1953), Czech actress and wife of former Czechoslovak President Václav Havel
- Dagmar Heib (born 1963), German politician
- Dagmar R. Henney (1931–2023), German-American mathematician and former professor
- Dagmar Herzog (born 1961), American scholar of gender and sexuality
- Dagmar Holst, rower for East Germany in the 1960s
- Dagmar Hülsenberg (born 1940), German materials scientist and university professor
- Dagmar Kersten (born 1970), German gymnast
- Dagmar Koller (born 1939), Austrian actress and singer
- Dagmar Krause (born 1950), German singer
- Dagmar Lahlum (1922–1999), Norwegian resistance fighter during World War II
- Dagmar Lassander (born 1943), German actress
- Dagmar Lerchová (1930–2017), Czechoslovak figure skater
- Dagmar Lurz (born 1959), German figure skater
- Dagmar Midcap (born 1969), Canadian media personality
- Dagmar Möller (1866–1956), Swedish opera singer and teacher
- Dagmar Neubauer (born 1962), German sprinter
- Dagmar Nordstrom (1903–1976), American composer, pianist, singer
- Dagmar Normet (1921–2008), Estonian writer
- Dagmar Oakland (1893–1989), American actress
- Dagmar Oja (born 1981), Estonian singer and actress
- Dagmar Overbye (1883–1929), Danish child murderer and serial killer
- Dagmar Reichardt (born 1961), German cultural scholar
- Dagmar Rivera (born 1955), known as Dagmar (Puerto Rican entertainer), television host, comedian and singer
- Dagmar Roth-Behrendt (born 1953), German politician
- Dagmar Salén (1901–1980), Swedish sailor, first Swedish woman to win an Olympic medal in sailing
- Dagmar Schipanski (1943–2022), German physicist, academic, and politician
- Dagmar Švubová (born 1958), Czechoslovak cross country skier
- Dagmar Wilson (1916–2011), anti-nuclear testing activist and illustrator of children's books
- Dagmar Wöhrl (born 1954), German politician

== Fictional characters ==
- Dagmar, an engine room worker on a yacht in the 1990 film Joe Versus the Volcano
- Dagmar, friend of Maria in Netflix series Lady Dynamite
- Queen Dagmar, Bean's mother and first wife of King Zøg in Netflix series Disenchantment

== See also ==
- Dagmar (disambiguation)
