= Dagmar Hülsenberg =

German materials scientist

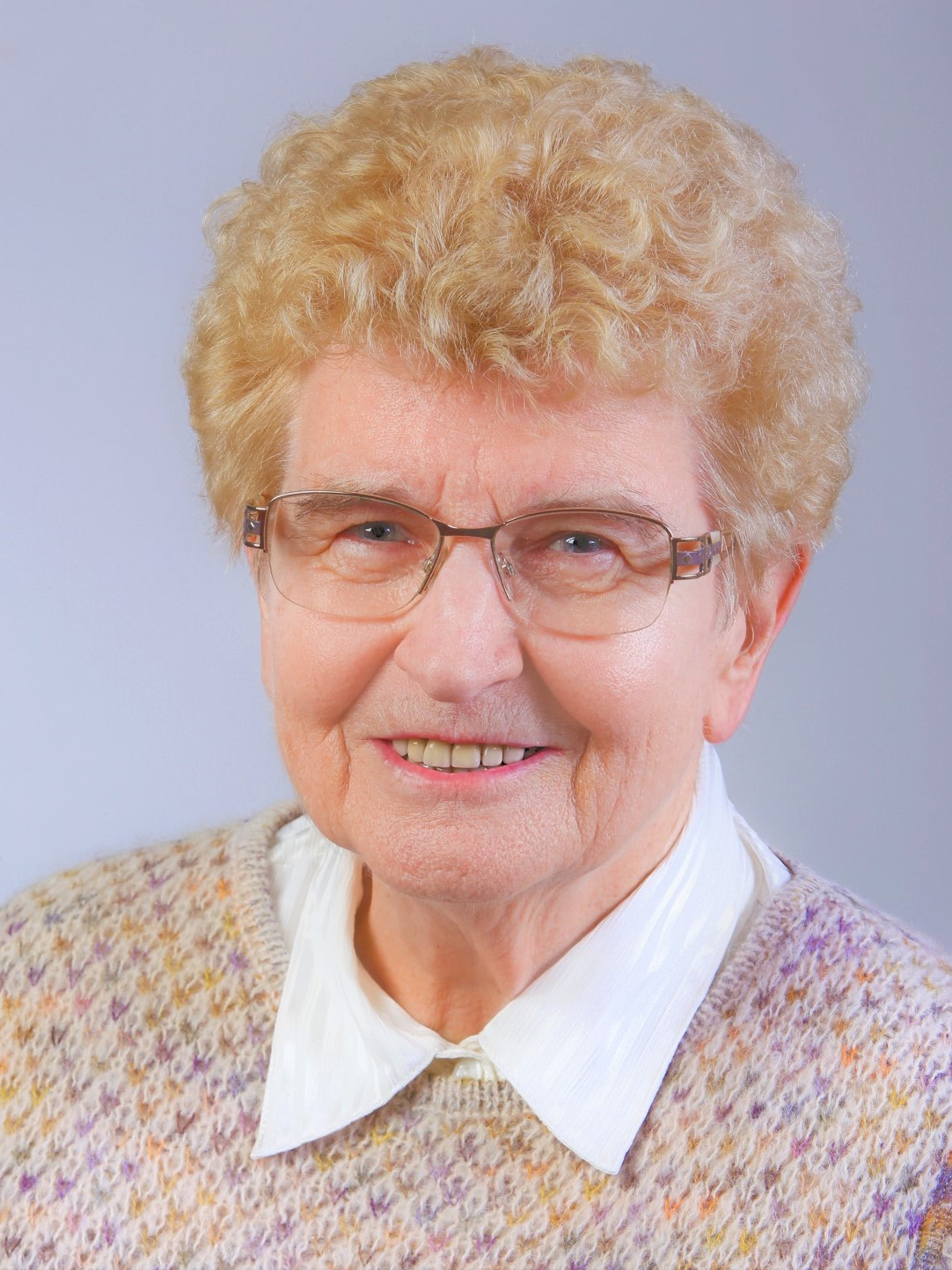
- Hülsenberg in 2019
- Born: Dagmar Hinz; 2 December 1940 (age 84); Sonneberg, Thuringia, Germany
- Occupations: University professor; materials scientist
- Spouses: Frieder Hülsenberg; Manfred Engshuber

Dagmar Hülsenberg (née Hinz; born 2 December 1940, in Sonneberg) is a German materials scientist and university professor.

In 1975, at age 34, she became the youngest full professor in the German Democratic Republic. By that time she had already distinguished herself by obtaining doctorates in two barely related disciplines: Economics/Cost accounting (1969) and Engineering/Materials science (1970).

== Life ==
Dagmar Hinz was born soon after the start of the Second World War in Sonneberg, a small town in the centre of southern Germany, located between Würzburg and Leipzig. Before she was 3 her father had been killed in the fighting. Her mother worked as a milliner. By the time she had successfully completed her schooling the war had ended, in May 1945, and after the armies had finished repositioning themselves Sonneberg had ended up at the edge of the Soviet occupation zone in what remained of Germany. The entire zone was refounded as the German Democratic Republic in October 1949. During the later 1950s Hinz undertook an apprenticeship for work as a Ceramics and Pottery technician. She later recalled that she had really wanted to become an economist, but had been unable to obtain a study-place. In 1960, with support from her boss at the ceramics factory, she was able to obtain a place at the Freiberg University of Mining and Technology where she studied Silicate Metallurgy, emerging with a degree in 1965. She then obtained a university position as a research assistant and started working on a doctorate.

"You must be prepared really to discipline yourself. Regardless of all the potential distractions, you must try and make the best possible use of your opportunities to study."
"Man muss bereit sein, sich wirklich anzustrengen. Trotz aller Freiheit sollte man versuchen, die Studienzeit maximal zu nutzen."

Dagmar Hülsenberg

During the 1960s she married the economist Frieder Hülsenberg. At this time Hülsenberg was writing a book, drafts for which his wife read. She alerted him to an important inconsistency in the text which he was obliged to discuss with his co-author, the Dresden Economics Professor Otto Gallenmüller. One upshot of the ensuing discussions was that Dagmar Hülsenberg hurriedly mastered relevant portions of the Economics syllabus and, in 1969, obtained a doctorate from Freiberg University in Economics for a dissertation entitled "Determining an optimal number of cost centres and cost objects, with particular attention to error aggregation" Just a year later, in 1970, she received a second doctorate, this time in Material Sciences: her dissertation on this occasion was entitled "High-temperature deformation of heterogeneous materials, illustrated using fire-resistant chamotte (fire clay)"

Publications (selection)

- Hülsenberg, D., Harnisch, A., Bismarck, A.: Microstructuring of Glasses; Springer-Verlag: Berlin, Heidelberg, New York 2008.
- Hülsenberg, D., Krüger, H.-G., Steiner, W.: Keramikformgebung. Springer-Verlag: Berlin, Heidelberg, New York 1989.
- Hülsenberg, D., Knauf, O.: Fusion of Glasses with High Content of Iron Oxide. In: Advances in Fusion and Processing of Glass. In: Ceramic Transactions 29, 1993. S. 289-297.
- Hülsenberg, D. et al.: Einkristallines Bariumhexaferritpulver: Herstellung, Eigenschaften, Anwendung in der Mikrotechnik. In: Technische Keramische Werkstoffe, 52. Ergänzungslieferung. Fachverlag Deutscher Wirtschaftsdienst GmbH: Köln 1999, pp. 1-50.
- Hülsenberg, D. et al.: Electromagnetic stirring of glass melts using Lorentz forces. In: Glass Sci. Technol. 77, 4, 2004. pp. 186-193.
- Hülsenberg, D. et al.: Mikrostrukturierung von Glas. In: Galvanotechnik 98(10), 2007. S. 2530-2537.
- Hülsenberg, D., Fehling, P., Leutbecher, T.: Damage tolerant, translucent oxide fiber/glass matrix-composites. In: Composites Part B 39, 2, 2008. pp. 362-373..

In 1970, she moved to the Ministerium für Leichtindustrie (Ministry of light industry) and later to the Ministerium für Glas- und Keramikindustrie (Ministry for the glass and ceramics industries) where she was involved in preparing the national plan for science and technology (Plan für Wissenschaft und Technik). Looking back, she recalled that she had not much enjoyed work at the ministries: five years had been enough.

In 1975 she switched again, back to the academic world, accepting the newly created professorship of "Glass and Ceramics Materials and Technology" at the Ilmenau Technical Academy, back in Thuringia. At the time she was the youngest professor in the country, and her tenure would comfortably outlast the German Democratic Republic itself, ending only in 2007.

From 1984 until 1990 Dagmar Hülsenberg served as a member of the National Research Council. Between 1976 and 1987 she chaired the Silicates Technology Expert Committee of the FDGB Chamber of Technology, and from 1987 until 1992 she served as (the last) president of the Chamber of Technology, in succession to Manfred Schubert who had died young. She became a corresponding member of the national German Academy of Sciences in 1989. and has been a member of the Saxony Academy of Sciences, based in Leipzig since 1986: she became a member of the presidium in 2004. She is a member of the German Ceramics Society, the German Glass Technology Society and of the German Academy of Science and Engineering.
