= Cyclone Dagmar =

2011 European windstorm

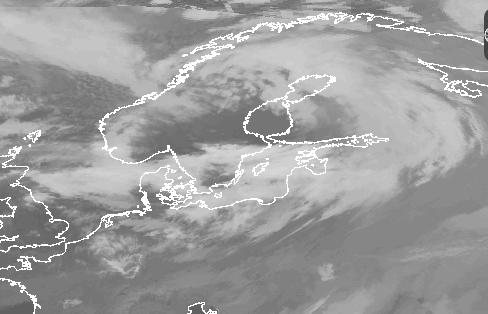
- Storm Dagmar over Scandinavia 26 December 2011

Meteorological history
- Formed: 24 December 2011
- Dissipated: 27 December 2011

European windstorm, Extratropical cyclone

Overall effects
- Fatalities: 2
- Damage: $45 million (2011 USD)
- Areas affected: Norway, Sweden, Finland, Estonia, Russia

Cyclone Dagmar (also referred to as Cyclone Tapani in Finland and as Cyclone Patrick by the Free University of Berlin) was a powerful European windstorm which swept over Norway on Christmas Day 2011, causing severe damage in central coastal areas, before continuing over the Scandinavian peninsula towards the Baltic Sea and Gulf of Finland. The storm caused $45 million (2011 USD) in damage.

== Meteorological history ==
Patrick formed as a small low just south of Newfoundland on 24 December. The system raced across the north Atlantic, deepening rapidly to 956 mb (28.2 inHg) by Christmas Day. Patricks extraordinary windspeed was due to it being a secondary low to the deep cyclone Oliver to the north and the powerful high Cora to the south, enhancing the southwesterly winds on the south side of the low. On 26 December, Patrick made landfall in western Norway with a central pressure of 964 mb (28.5 inHg). The storm continued to move eastwards at a rapid pace, however, as it was overland it had weakened significantly. It hit Finland the same day, St. Stephen's Day (Tapani in Finnish), and got the Finnish name due to that day. It then moved out of the Free University of Berlin's tracking charts the next day.

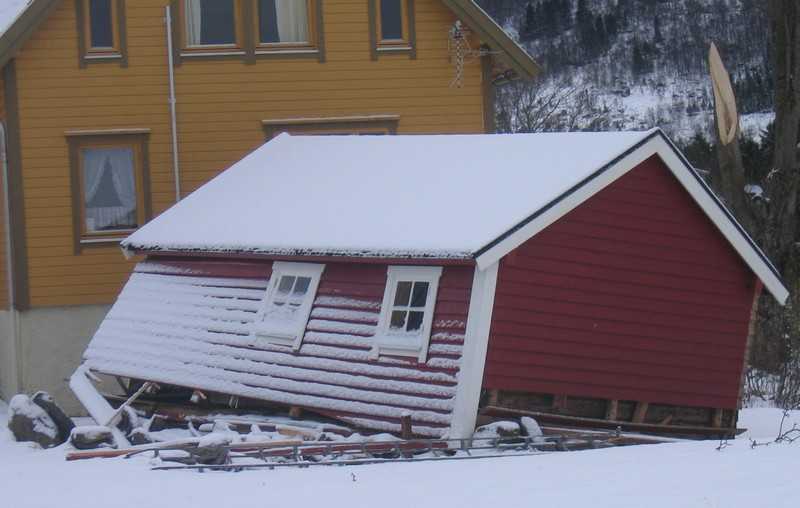
Damaged outbuilding in Norway

== Impact ==
=== Norway ===
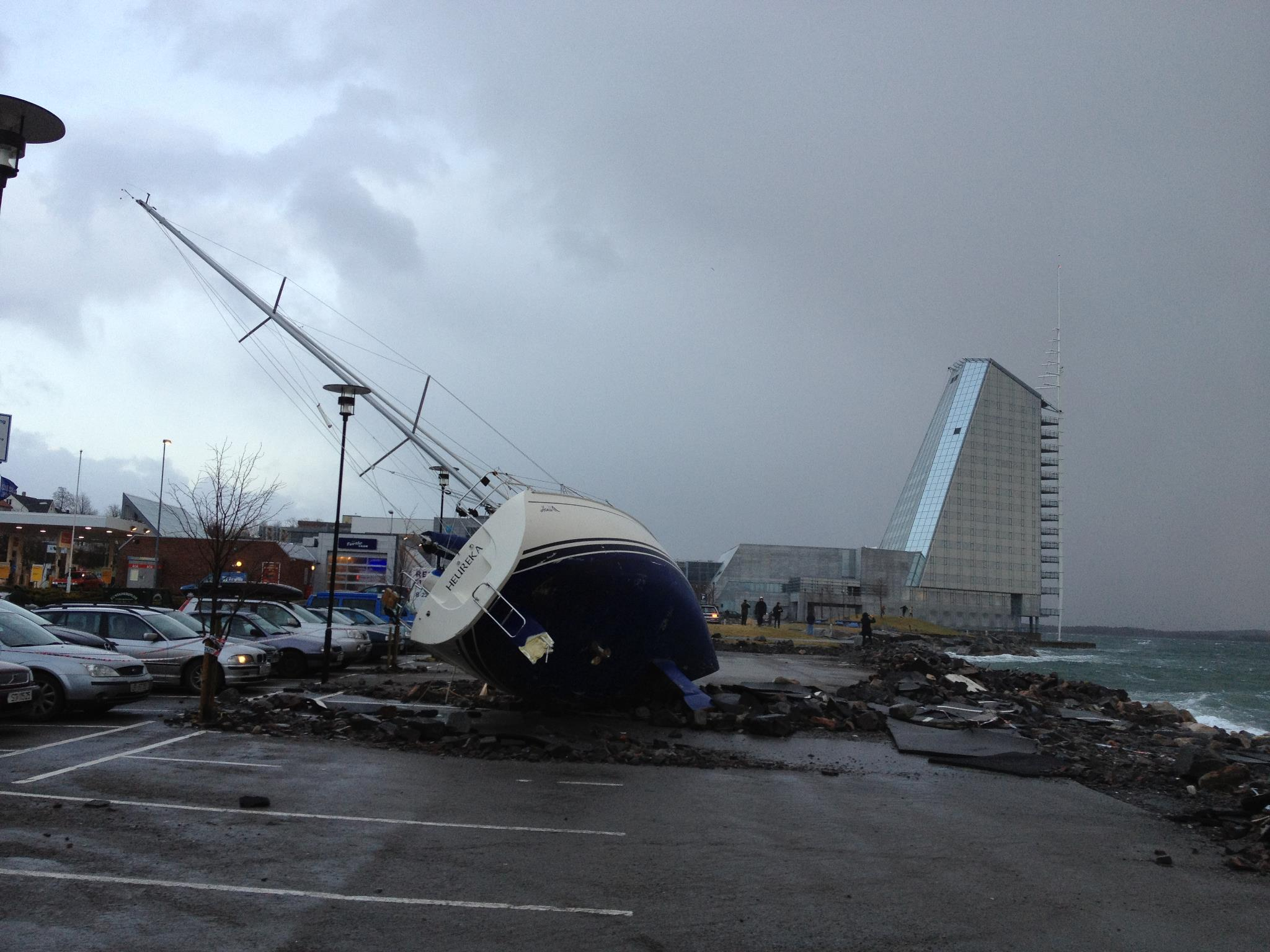
Damage in Molde, Norway

Patrick (Dagmar) arrived in Norway as a southwesterly storm, with windspeeds estimated to be on average 110 km/h (30 m/s; 67 mph) on the coast. Up to 160 km/h (44 m/s; 98 mph) 10 minute sustained winds was measured at Kråkenes Lighthouse, Sogn og Fjordane, before the anemometer broke. Powerful winds occurred in Sogn og Fjordane, Møre og Romsdal and Trøndelag during the night of 24 December and early morning of 25 December. Extreme high storm surge in Finnmark estimated to be 50–80 cm (20–31 in) over normal sea levels, although this was due to the preceding storm Cato (Oliver). In Norway comparison was made with the New Year's Day Storm of 1992, however this storm was not as strong Patrick (Dagmar) is believed to be the third strongest storm to hit Norway in 50 years. A large landslide on 1 January 2012 close to the Norwegian city of Trondheim has been attributed to the warm weather and large amounts of rain the system brought to the area, which resulted in 50 people being evacuated. The pier area of Trondheim was badly damaged during the storm, heavily damaging the façade of the Pirbadet water park. A F2 tornado was reported in Hellesylt, Norway. The Tanker BW Thames was disabled and adrift northwest of Bergen as the storm approached, however the crew were able to regain power and survived the storm without incident. The Russian trawler Krasnoselsk sank in Hundeidvika harbour in Sykkylven Municipality, Norway. Dagmar knocked out 390 Telenor communication masts leaving 40,000 customers without mobile or landline telephone connections. Royal Dutch Shell's Ormen Lange gas processing plant was inoperable after its electricity was cut off by the storm, which left gas supplies in the UK vulnerable as this facility can supply up to 20 percent of the UK's supply via the Langeled pipeline.

=== Sweden ===
Storm Dagmar mostly affected Southern Norrland and northern Svealand. The Swedish transport authority suspended all train traffic north of Gävle at 20:00 on Christmas Day in preparation. Many trees fell in the storm, bringing down power lines and blocking roads and railways. Approximately 170,000 households were left without power between Uppland and Västerbotten, some for several days. Train traffic came to a standstill in Norrland, however the principal north–south route of the country (European route E4) was quickly cleared. Several weather stations in the Norrland interior experienced their strongest wind gusts in 15 years. Winds of 41 metres per second (92 mph) were recorded on the pylons of the Höga Kusten Bridge. 1.2 million Swedish Kronor of damage was caused in Ljusdal when sixteen rail wagons weighing 313 tonnes (345 short tons) were blown along the railway for 500 m (1,600 ft) until they derailed on a road intersection. Some 40,000 homes were still without power around 14:00 on 27 December.

=== Finland ===
Patrick (Tapani) was dubbed the worst storm in Finland in 10 years. Thousands of customers were left without electricity in Southern Finland. The storm was a rare event in Finland and gave the warmest Christmas period in half a century. An old man is reported to have died after being hit by a falling tree.

=== Estonia ===
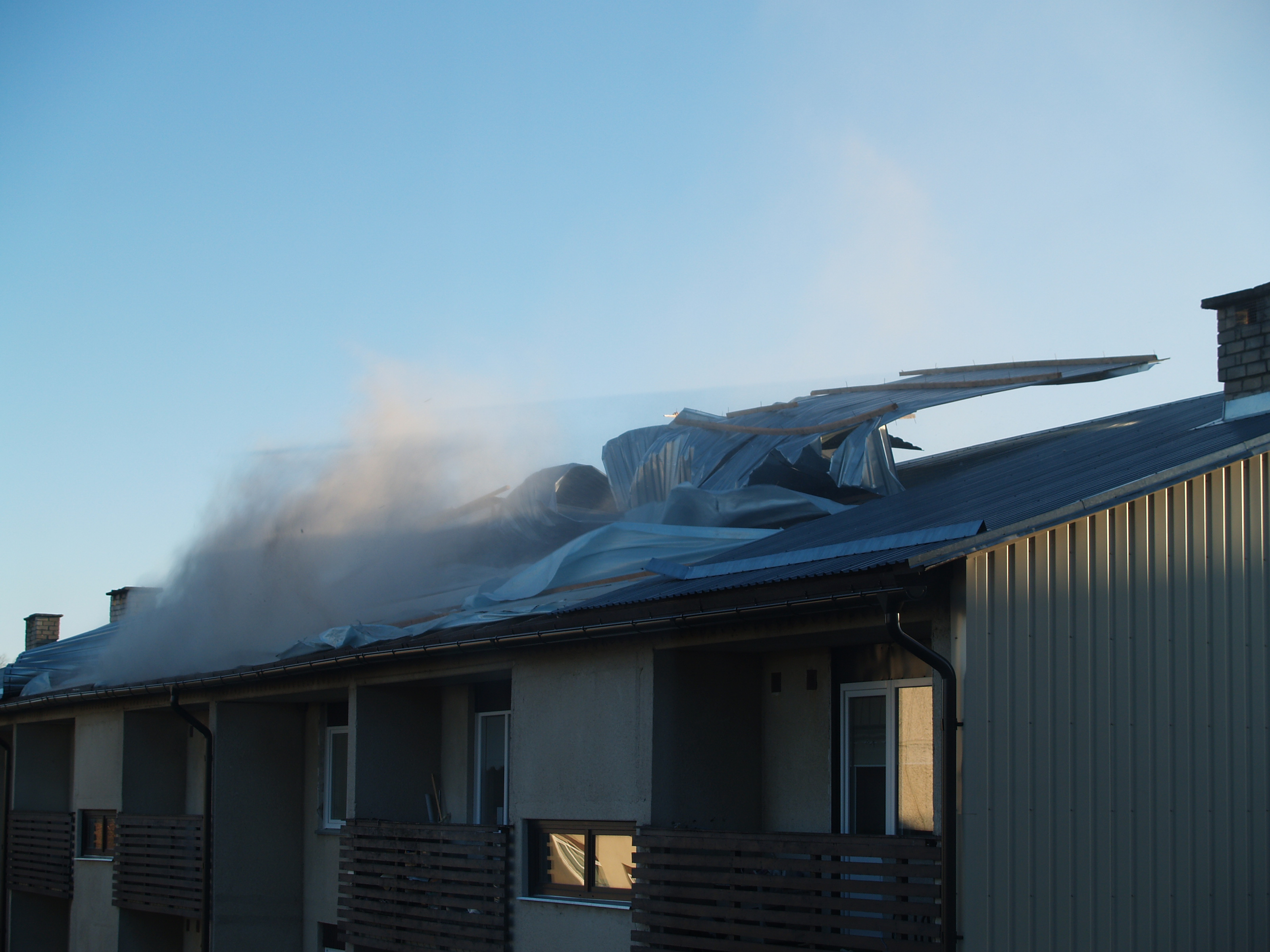
Storm removing a roof from a house in Kose, Estonia

Patrick left 100,000 homes without power in Estonia, and triggered 600 rescue operations. Eesti Energia reassigned its customer services personnel to answer emergency calls. Patrick also brought record high temperatures to the country for December. Flooding was reported in the streets of major cities.

=== Russia ===
The Saint Petersburg Dam gates were closed to protect the city, preventing 15 ships from entering the port. The storm tore metal sheeting from roofs and many trees were brought down. Leningrad Nuclear Power Plant was also affected, as algae and mud stirred up by the storm were sucked into the cooling system, resulting in one of the generators being shut down.

== Aftermath ==
Deutsche Bank estimated that the price of wood could fall by up to 15%.

== See also ==
- List of European windstorms
- Cyclone Xaver
- Cyclone Ulli
