= Cyclone Joachim =

2011 European windstorm

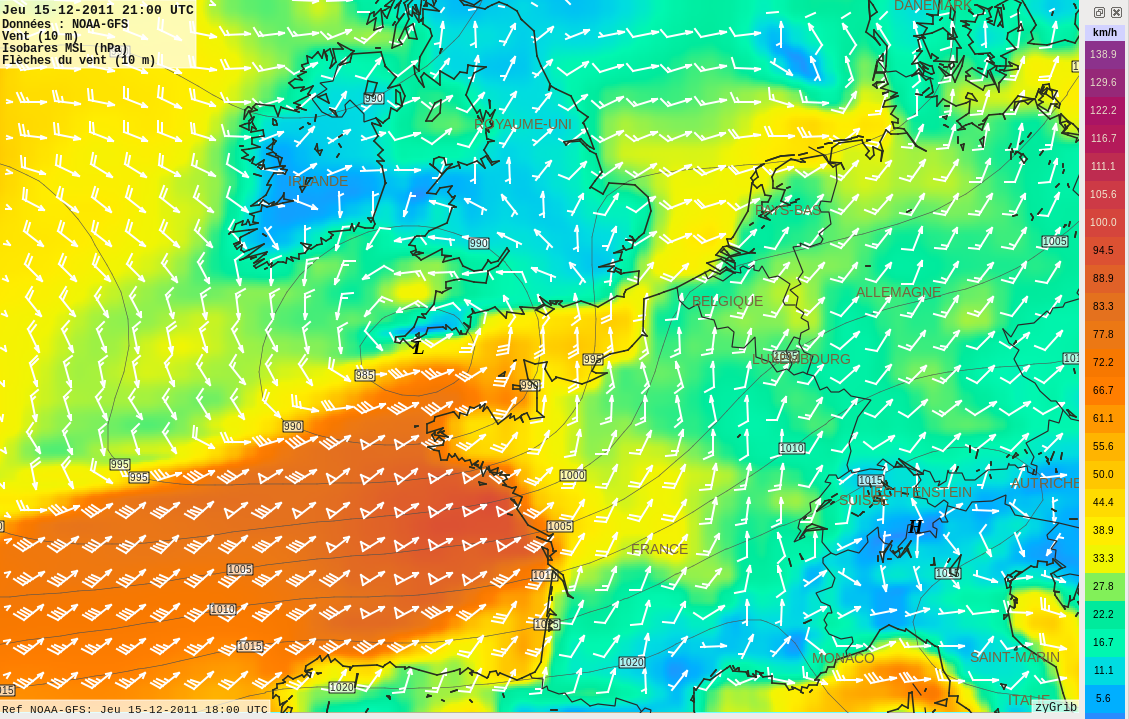
- Wind map of the storm Joachim approaching the French coast on 15 December 2011

Meteorological history
- Formed: 15 December 2011
- Dissipated: 22 December 2011

Meteorological information
- Highest gusts: 212 km/h (132 mph)
- Lowest pressure: 966 mbar (966 hPa)

Overall effects
- Areas affected: British Isles, Spain, France, Belgium, Netherlands, Switzerland, Germany, Czech Republic, Poland

Joachim is the name given to a European windstorm which caused major damage in much of Western Europe between December 16–17, 2011. Winds gusting to 212 km/h (132 mph) were recorded on the summit of Puy de Dôme in France. Joachim explosively deepened under the influence of a shortwave trough during its development.

== Impact ==
At least 400,000 people were without power in France. In Brittany, on the north-western coast of France, the cargo ship TK Bremen was blown aground. The nineteen-man crew was evacuated by helicopter, and the ship later disassembled.

Major damage occurred on the Spanish coast.

Roofs and trees were blown away, and all navigation on the Swiss lakes was closed. In the canton of Bern, a tree fell onto the railway line between Tramelan and Tavannes. This caused a train to derail, and its forward cars fell into the forest; three passengers suffered minor injuries.

The wind was followed by polar air, and the rain turning to snow at high altitudes and descending into the plain caused serious conditions. Most of the major ski resorts in Valais were closed, as well as numerous roads and tunnels.

Air traffic was affected.

== Aftermath ==
According to Perils AG, property insurers may face costs of €300 million from the storm.

== See also ==
- TK Bremen

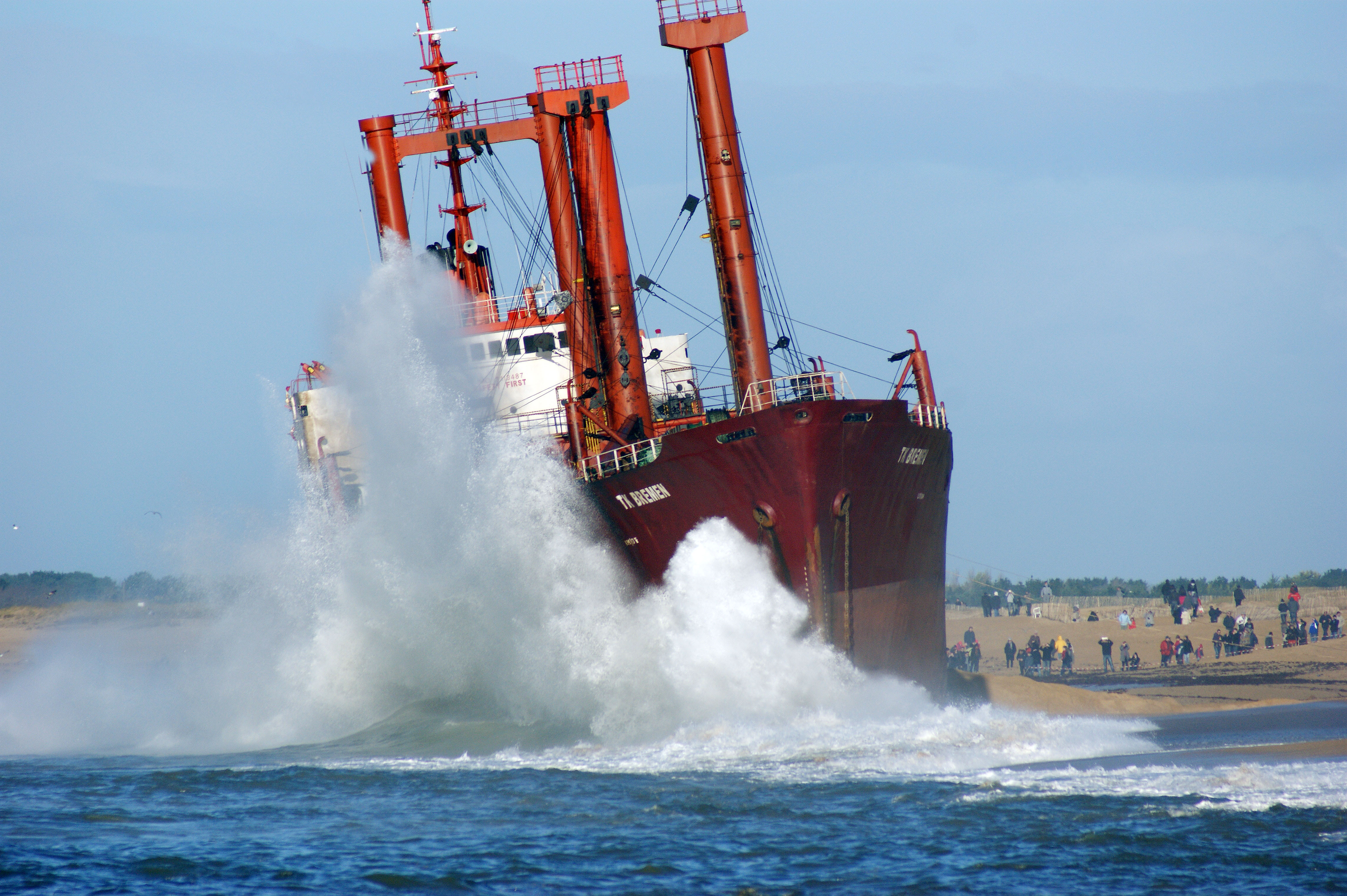
Beached TK Bremen
