= List of European windstorms =

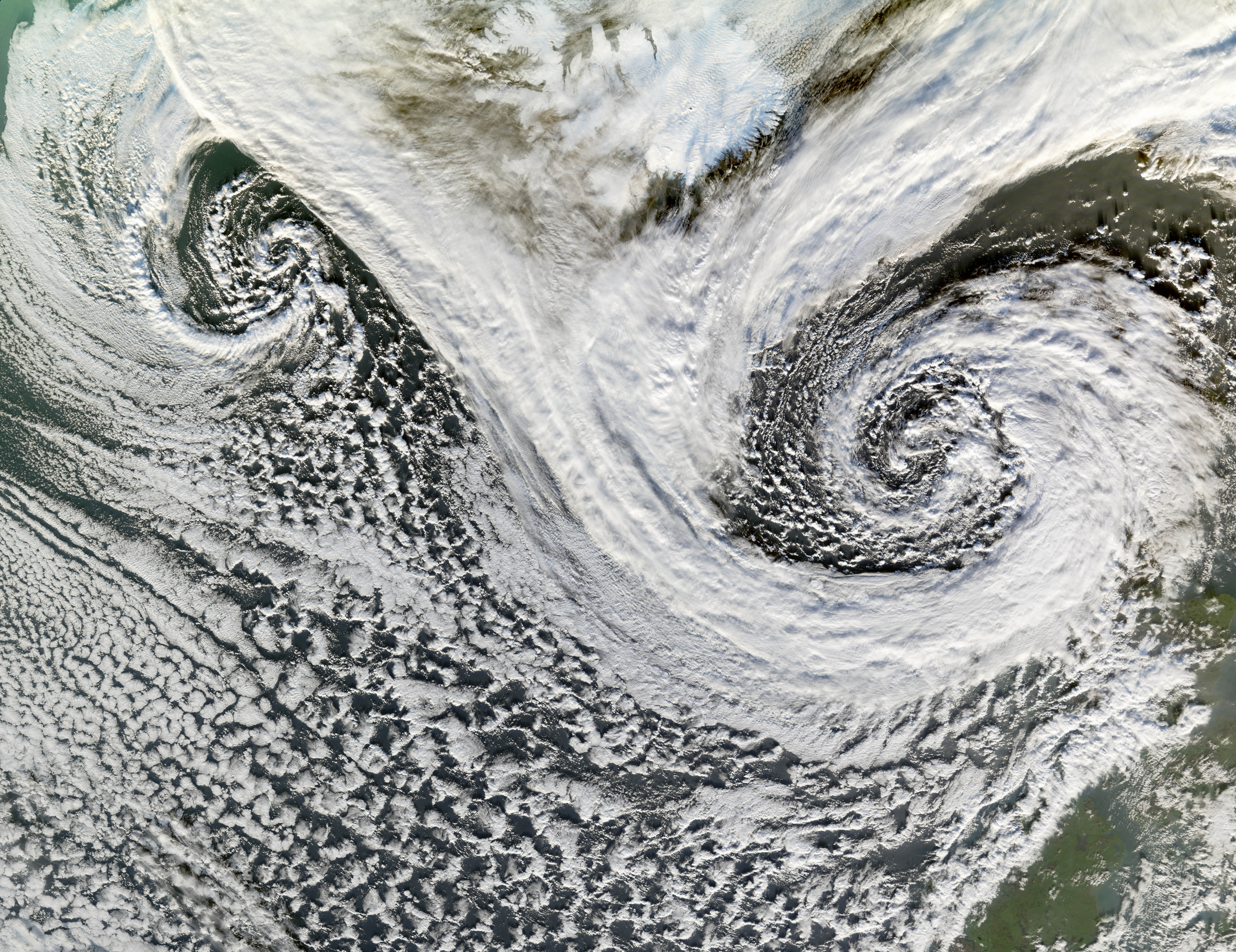
Satellite picture of extratropical cyclones south of Iceland.

The following is a list of notable European windstorms.

== Windstorms ==
=== Before 1800 ===
Event	Date	Notes
Grote Mandrenke (known as St Maury's wind in Ireland)	15–16 January 1362	A southwesterly Atlantic gale swept across England, the Netherlands, northern Germany and southern Denmark, killing over 25,000 and changing the Dutch-German-Danish coastline.
All Saints' Flood	1 November 1570 (11 November, New Style)	
Spanish Armada storms	1588	After the Battle of Gravelines, the Armada was forced to flee northwards, and attempted to return to Spain by sailing around Scotland and Ireland. Here, the ships ran into a series of powerful westerly gales. Already in poor condition after an extended period at sea, many ships were sunk, or driven onto the coast and wrecked, with over 50 ships lost. The late 16th century, and especially 1588, was marked by unusually strong North Atlantic storms, perhaps associated with a high accumulation of polar ice off the coast of Greenland, a characteristic phenomenon of the "Little Ice Age."
Hard Candlemas	2 February 1602	The Faroe Islands were hit by a great storm, today still remembered as the hard Kyndelmisse. The storm permanently destroyed the sheltered natural harbour at Saksun.
Burchardi Flood	11–12 October 1634	Also known as "second Grote Mandrenke", hit North Frisia, drowned about 8,000–15,000 people and destroyed the island of Strand.
Culbin Sands storm	Autumn 1694	A storm saw 20–30 km^{2} (7.7–11.6 sq mi) of farmland overwhelmed by sand at the Culbin Estate, Moray Scotland.
Great Storm of 1703	26 November 1703	Severe gales affected south coast of England. Between 8,000 and 15,000 lives were lost overall.
Portugal and Madeira storm	18–19 November 1724	One of the most destructive storms ever experienced in Portugal since the early 17th century, causing damage to the east coast of Madeira and central and northern Portugal (though unclear if it was not a tropical system such as Hurricane Vince, which impacted Europe in 2005).
St Hilaire–Prisca storms	14–18 January 1739	Between 14 and 18 January 1739, a series of storms severely affected France, Switzerland and southern Germany. The period has been named after the saints' days of the first and the last day of its occurrence. The storms are considered to be similar to Lothar and Martin of 1999.
St Barbara storm	4 December 1739	Affected Portugal.

=== 1800–1899 ===
Event	Date	Notes
Galnemåndagen	11 March 1822	A severe storm in Norway which may have caused over 300 deaths in the country of fishermen.
February 1825		3–5 February 1825: Winds over the North Sea led to the February flood of 1825 storm surge in the North Sea.; 1 February 1825: Windstorm passed over Scotland with winds around 140 kn (160 mph; 260 km/h).
Night of the Big Wind	6–7 January 1839	The most severe windstorm to hit Ireland in recent centuries, with hurricane-force winds, killed between 250 and 300 people and rendered hundreds of thousands of homes uninhabitable.
Moray Firth fishing disaster	August 1848	
1850	Winter 1850	29 January, Yrväderstisdagen, saw Sweden affected by one of the worst snowstorms on record.; 5–6 February 1850. The Great Storm of 1850 saw a damaging gale cross the UK (tentatively linked to scouring of turf and sand which covered the Neolithic settlement of Skara Brae in Orkney).
Royal Charter Storm	25–26 October 1859	The Royal Charter Storm was considered to be the most severe storm to hit the British Isles in the 19th century, with a total death toll estimated at over 800. It takes its name from the Royal Charter ship, which was driven by the storm onto the east coast of Anglesey, Wales with the loss of over 450 lives.
Great Gale of 1871	10 February 1871	A severe storm affected England with 28 ships wrecked on the northeast coast, total fatalities are estimated at over 50.
"Lothar's big brother"	12 March 1876	Maximum winds crossed northern France, Belgium, Luxembourg and into Germany. Swiss Re report that this was the worst event in the 19th and early 20th century, with a footprint similar to the storm Lothar of 1999.
The Tay Bridge Disaster	28 December 1879	Severe gales (estimated to be Force 10–11) swept the east coast of Scotland, infamously resulting in the collapse of the Tay Rail Bridge and the loss of 75 people who were on board the ill-fated train.
Eyemouth Disaster	14 October 1881	A severe storm struck the southeast coast of Scotland. 189 fishermen were killed, most of whom were from the small village of Eyemouth.
The Ochtertyre storm	19–28 January 1884	A series of deep Atlantic depressions crossed the northwestern areas of the UK, a storm on 26 January saw the UK's record lowest air pressure measured at Ochtertyre, Perthshire of 925.6 hPa. Swiss Re stated the storm's damaging swathe of winds were larger than those of the Burns Day storm of 1990.
The great storm of November 1893	16–20 November 1893	
"North German Express"	12 February 1894	A rapidly moving storm brought high winds to Northern Ireland, Scotland, Northern England and northern Germany, reaching a maximum depth estimated at 945 hPa (27.9 inHg) over Norway.

=== 1900–1974 ===
Event	Date	Notes
Christmas Hurricane of 1902	25–26 December 1902	The Danish Meteorological Institute report a single measurement from a balloon at Hald in central Jutland with an hourly mean wind value of 35 m/s (130 km/h; 78 mph). DMI estimate the strongest winds probably reached 50 m/s (180 km/h; 110 mph) or more. The storm was relatively short-lived and caused extensive damage to forestry as it passed from southern Norway to the Gulf of Riga, with a swathe of damage stretching from north Jutland to Bornholm. The storm also saw significant flooding.
Storm Ulysses	26–27 February 1903	Probably the most severe to affect Ireland since the Night of the Big Wind, with an estimated 1000–3000 trees uprooted in Phoenix Park, Dublin. Following a stormy period between the 18–26 which saw several depressions pass close by to the west coast of Ireland. The storm's low pressure was estimated at 975 mb (28.8 inHg) (Lamb, 1991). A quote from Ulysses by James Joyce is likely based on the aftermath of this storm- "O yes, J.J. O'Molloy said eagerly. Lady Dudley was walking home through the park to see all the trees that were blown down by that cyclone last year and thought she'd buy a view of Dublin."
Ulvsund storm	23–24 October 1921	The S.S. Ulvsund capsized during the storm on a sailing between Copenhagen and Nakskov, Lolland.
Halaveðrið	7–8 February 1925	A deep storm affected Iceland with the loss of two trawlers and over 60 men.
	28 January 1927	A storm strongly affected the UK and Ireland, with a gust of 90 kn (100 mph; 170 km/h) recorded in Paisley.
Cleggan Bay Disaster	28 October 1927	Storm affected the west coast of Ireland, with 45 people drowned, led to the abandonment of the Inishkea Islands. There was also coastal flooding in the Irish Sea along Cardigan Bay and 5 fatalities in Fleetwood, Lancashire.
1928 Thames flood	6–7 January 1928	Snow melt combined with heavy rainfall and a storm surge in the North Sea led to flooding in central London and the loss of 14 lives.
Western Europe windstorm	23–25 November 1928	A windstorm affected parts of Northwestern Europe for more than two days and killed 38 people, mainly in England.
Central Europe windstorm	Early July 1929	A severe and deadly windstorm moved through central Europe in early July 1929 and killed 38 people.
Southern and central England gales	5–8 December 1929	A stormy period from 5 to 8 December 1929 saw two depressions (central pressure of 950 mb [28 inHg]), move north-eastwards across Ireland bringing severe gales in south-west England. Mean hourly wind speeds around 55–60 kn (63–69 mph; 102–111 km/h) with gusts exceeding 80 kn (92 mph; 150 km/h) at Falmouth on each day from the 5th to the 8th and at Scilly from the 6th to the 8th. Extremes during this period were: mean hourly winds of 61 and 60 kn (70 and 69 mph; 113 and 111 km/h) at Falmouth on the 5th and 6th and 59 kn (68 mph; 109 km/h) at Scilly on the 7th, and gusts of 89 kn (102 mph; 165 km/h) at Falmouth on the 6th and 7th and Scilly on the 7th, while on the evening of the 6th Scilly registered a gust of 96 kn (110 mph; 178 km/h), equalling the then highest ever recorded at a low-level station in Great Britain in December. Mean wind speeds between 40 and 50 kn (46 and 58 mph; 74 and 93 km/h), and gusts between 65 and 75 kn (75 and 86 mph; 120 and 139 km/h), occurred in many parts of the country during the period.
	16–17 September 1935	Formed as a secondary depression west of Ireland, before moving over southern Ireland to Northern England. The low brought severe gales to south western England, Wales and southern England.
Iberian windstorm	13–15 February 1941	A storm made a direct hit on Lisbon while damaging winds affected the whole of Portugal. Low of 950 hPa (28 inHg), reaching winds up to 180 km/h (110 mph) in San Sebastián, Spain. It remains one of the top five most severe windstorms across Europe during the 20th century.
October Gales	24–26 October 1945	Gales in October 1945 killed two and washed up many mines along the south coast of England with winds over 90 mph (140 km/h).
North Sea storm disturbance	8 January 1949	
North Sea Flood of 1953	31 January–1 February 1953	Considered to be the worst natural disaster of the 20th century both in the Netherlands and the United Kingdom, claiming over two thousand lives altogether. A storm originating over Ireland moved around the Scottish west coast, over Orkney, down the east coast of Scotland and England and across the North Sea to the Netherlands. Sea defences in the Netherlands and eastern England were overwhelmed. The ferry MV Princess Victoria, travelling between Scotland and Northern Ireland, was lost with 133 people drowned, and over a quarter of the Scottish fishing fleet was also lost. In the Netherlands, flooding killed 1,835 people and forced the emergency evacuation of 70,000 more as sea water inundated 1,365 km^{2} (527 sq mi) of land. An estimated 30,000 animals drowned, and 47,300 buildings were damaged of which 10,000 were destroyed. Total damage was estimated at that time at 895 million Dutch guilders.
Sweden snowstorm	3–4 January 1954	
Hurricane Debbie	17 September 1961	North-west Ireland, much of Scotland and the Northern Isles hit by severe gales, which were the residuals of Hurricane Debbie.
Vincinette; Great Sheffield Gale (North Sea flood of 1962)	16–17 February 1962	Including the Great Sheffield Gale, westerly gales swept the entire United Kingdom during 16 and 17 February 1962, a "resonant lee wave effect" over the Pennines led to over 150,000 houses in Sheffield, nearly two-thirds of the city's entire housing stock being damaged. The storm moved south-east and reached the German coast of the North Sea with wind speeds up to 200 km/h (120 mph). The accompanying storm surge combined with high tide pushed water up the Weser and Elbe, breaching dikes and caused extensive flooding, especially in Hamburg. 315 people were killed, around 60,000 were left homeless.
Channel Islands storm	9 October 1964	A storm tracked along the English Channel bringing intense winds and damage to the Channel Islands.
Ferrybridge cooling tower collapse	1 November 1965	Ferrybridge power station near Pontefract saw three cooling towers collapse due to vibrations in 85 mph (137 km/h) winds. The grouped shape of the cooling towers meant that westerly winds were funnelled into the towers themselves, creating a vortex. Three out of the original eight cooling towers were destroyed and the remaining five were severely damaged. The towers were rebuilt and all eight cooling towers were strengthened to tolerate adverse weather conditions.
"Adolph Bermpohl" storm	23–24 February 1967	Named after the Adolph Bermpohl which was lost in the storm. The German Naval Observatory at the time reported the storm brought the highest winds ever measured in the North Sea.
Scandinavian storm (Lena)	17–18 October 1967	October 1967 was one of the wettest in Denmark with several areas of low pressure passing the country. Wind speeds over 40 m/s (140 km/h; 89 mph) were recorded across Denmark and at the southern tip of Öland, Sweden.
1968 Scotland storm	15 January 1968	This storm tracked north up the west coast of Scotland. In Glasgow, some 20 people were killed, 40 injured and 2,000 people made homeless, Ayrshire and Argyll also affected.
Sweden storm	22 September 1969	
Quimburga	11–14 November 1972	A storm that struck northern Europe in mid-November 1972 and spawned a tornado that killed 28 in Germany. The MV Mebo II radio ship of RNI ran adrift losing one of her anchors. The crew managed to start the engines, and after sailing back to her original anchoring spot near Scheveningen, the spare anchor was securing the vessel's position again.
Unnamed	13 April 1973	A storm affecting the north and west coastal areas of the Netherlands, northern German and western Danish coastal areas, getting the unmotorised MV Norderney radio ship of Radio Veronica stranded at the Scheveningen coast. Widespread destruction of ca. 2 million trees at the Veluwe.
Irish windstorm	11–12 January 1974	Record winds, sometimes of hurricane force, recorded in many parts of Ireland. The strongest ever sea level gust in Ireland, at exactly 200 km/h (120 mph), was recorded in Kilkeel, County Down. Many trees and buildings were damaged and 250,000 premises were left without electricity (approx 1 in 4 in the county).
Norway windstorm	Mid February 1974	Winds up to 160 km/h (100 mph) battered the United Kingdom and Norway in mid February 1974, killing 19.

=== 1975–1999 ===
Event	Date	Notes
Gale of January 1976 ("Capella storm")	2–5 January 1976	Central UK windspeed gusts of 105 mph (169 km/h) were measured at RAF Wittering. Middlesbrough saw winds of 114 mph (183 km/h). Widespread wind damage was reported across Europe from Ireland to Central Europe. Coastal flooding of 400 homes occurred in Cleethorpes, United Kingdom. In Ruisbroek, Antwerp, Belgium, dike failures and floods on the Scheldt estuary led to the adoption of the Sigmaplan (the Belgian equivalent of the Dutch Delta Works). The highest storm surge of the 20th century was recorded on the German North Sea coast, with some flooding of coastal marshes.
Fastnet disaster storm	13–14 August 1979	An unusual storm during the 1979 Fastnet yachting race resulted in 24 yachts being disabled or lost and 15 fatalities.
1981 storm series	November and December 1981	23–24 November: A severe storm affected Denmark and southern Sweden, killing two, with a storm surge breaking sea dikes along the Jutland coast. 23 November also saw 102 tornados reported in Britain.; 1981 December storm: In England, high tides combined with a storm surge resulted in extensive flooding and £6 million worth of damage along the Somerset coast of the Bristol Channel, with the highest water recorded in the Channel since the start of the century. In France, the storm caused widespread flooding in the south west, causing considerable damage in the river basins of the Garonne and Adour and flooding Bordeaux. Water entered the cooling water pump house of Hinkley Point nuclear power station, causing a shut-down for weeks after the storm.; 19 December: Another storm leads to the Penlee lifeboat disaster.
Christiansborg storm	18 January 1983	A windstorm affected Denmark, blowing a roof off Christiansborg Palace in Copenhagen which killed two.
Unnamed	13 January 1984	A Class 4 storm affected Denmark.
Ex-Hurricane Charley	25 August 1986	Rainfall records were broken in Ireland (e.g. 200 mm [7.9 in] in Kippure) with consequent flooding, up to 2.4 m (7.9 ft) in Dublin, and the storm also caused flooding in Wales and England. At least eleven people were killed in Ireland and Britain.
Unnamed	20 October 1986	A windstorm primarily affecting the Netherlands, Germany and Poland.
Great Storm of 1987	15–16 October 1987	This storm mainly affected southeastern England and northern France. In England maximum mean wind speeds of 70 kn (81 mph; 130 km/h) (an average over 10 minutes) were recorded. The highest gust of 117 kn (135 mph; 217 km/h) was recorded at Pointe du Raz in Brittany. In all, 19 people were killed in England and 4 in France. 15 million trees were uprooted in England (indeed, in mid-October most deciduous trees still have their leaves and were therefore more susceptible to windstorm damage and, following weeks of wet weather, the ground was sodden, providing little grip for the trees' roots). This storm received much media attention, and was the worst storm in South East England (including the London area where a peak gust of 94 mph was recorded) since 1703. The severity of the storm was not forecast until approximately 3 hrs before it hit and it struck after midnight, meaning few people had advance warning.
Scottish windstorm	13 February 1989	During this storm, a gust of 123 kn (142 mph; 228 km/h) was recorded at the Kinnaird Lighthouse (Fraserburgh) on the north-east coast of Scotland. This broke the highest low-level wind speed record for the British Isles. Much higher (unofficial) windspeeds have been recorded on the summit of Cairn Gorm and on Unst in Shetland.
1990 Storm series	25 January – 1 March 1990	1990 saw 8 storms impacting Europe between January and March.: Burns' Day storm (Daria) 25–26 January 1990. Widespread severe gales in the United Kingdom, France, the Benelux countries, and Germany. Isolated gusts of over 45 m/s (160 km/h; 100 mph) were recorded, causing extensive structural damage. The storm tracked across the United Kingdom into mainland Europe, where it was known under the name "Daria" and caused severe damage, especially to forests. In total, insurance losses resulting from this storm totalled about US$6bn.; Herta 1–6 February 1990.; Judith 7–8 February 1990.; Nana 11–12 February 1990.; Ottilie 13–14 February 1990.; Polly 14–15 February 1990.; Vivian 25–27 February 1990.; Wiebke 28 February – 1 March 1990. These storms primarily affected Switzerland and southern Germany and resulted in 64 fatalities. Coastal flooding also occurred in Towyn, North Wales.
Undine	5–6 January 1991	Undine crossed Ireland, the UK and Germany becoming one of the costliest storms of the 1990s with and estimated cost of £545m. A storm surge was noted with the storm's passage with waves up to 30 m (98 ft) high recorded out at sea. The storm was one of three which affected Europe in two weeks.
Unnamed	9 January 1991	A class 4 storm affected Denmark.
Iceland storm (Greenhouse low)	3 February 1991	A severe storm in Iceland saw in the Vestmannaeyjar (south of the Icelandic mainland) winds up to 56 m/s (200 km/h; 130 mph) with gusts probably exceeding 62 m/s (220 km/h; 140 mph), which was then the maximum the measuring stations were able to measure. Reykjavík reported hurricane-force winds with gusts up to 41 m/s (150 km/h; 92 mph). In the capital winds blew the roof off the Landspítali National University Hospital, while in Kópavogur the wind was filmed blowing over parked cars. 944 hPa.
New Year's Day Storm (Nyttårsorkanen) (Hogmanay hurricane)	1 January 1992	This storm affected much of northern Scotland and western Norway, unofficial records of gusts in excess of 130 kn (150 mph; 240 km/h) were recorded in Shetland, while Statfjord-B in the North Sea recorded wind gusts in excess of 145 kn (167 mph; 269 km/h). DNMI estimated the strongest sustained winds (10 min average) to have reached 90 kn (100 mph; 170 km/h), comparable to a Category 3 hurricane on the Saffir–Simpson scale. Very few fatalities occurred, mainly due to the very low population of the islands and the fact that the islanders are used to very high winds.
1993 Storm series	8–17 January 1993	Braer Storm of January 1993, the storm was the most intense extratropical cyclone ever recorded in the North Atlantic, with a central pressure of 916 mb (27.0 inHg), the intensity of a Category 5 hurricane. 96 mph (154 km/h) wind gusts were recorded in the Shetland Isles.; Verena, 13–14 January 1993: A storm with a low of 980 mb (29 inHg) affected the Southern Baltic. During the storm the Polish ferry MS Jan Heweliusz capsizes, with 55 lives lost.
Lore	28 January 1994	
Christmas Eve storm (Yuma)	23–25 December 1997	On Christmas Eve, an intense secondary depression tracked north-east across Scotland, bringing severe gales and heavy rain. The storm caused 6 fatalities, extensive structural damage and disruption to National Grid. Blackpool's North Pier in north-west England was also damaged.
Fanny	1–5 January 1998	An intense secondary depression crossed Ireland and northern England bringing severe gales to Wales and southern England, with winds gusting up to 77 mph (124 km/h). This was probably the most severe storm since the Burns Day Storm of 1990 in southern England and Wales, bringing widespread disruption to power and communications and property, including river and coastal flooding.
Xylia	28 October 1998	
Boxing Day Storm (Stephen)	26 December 1998	Severe gales over Ireland, northern England, and southern Scotland. Winds speeds of 103 mph (166 km/h) were recorded at Prestwick airport, and 93 mph (150 km/h) in Glasgow. Widespread disruption and power outages in Northern Ireland and southern Scotland. The Forth Road Bridge was fully closed for the first time since its construction in 1964.
Anatol	3 December 1999	Hurricane like storm Anatol hits Denmark and neighbouring countries. Killing 7 in Denmark alone. Pressure: 952.4 hPa (28.12 inHg). Wind speeds above 137 km/h (85 mph), gusts up to 185 km/h (115 mph). Worst storm in Denmark since 1871.
Cyclone Lothar and Martin	26–28 December 1999	France, Switzerland and Germany were hit by severe storms and rain. Over 100 people were killed, and the storm caused extensive damage to property and trees and the French and German national power grids, including an emergency due to flooding at the Blayais Nuclear Power Plant. The first storm in the series, dubbed Lothar by European forecasters, rapidly developed just off of the French coast and swept inland. Each of these systems was associated with an intense jet stream aloft and benefitted from latent heat release through atmosphere-ocean exchange processes. "Lothar" and "Martin", as the second storm was dubbed, were extratropical cyclones and had a hurricane-like shape, with an eye at the center. In the first storm, a gust of 184 km/h (114 mph) was recorded at Ushant (in French Ouessant) in Brittany and in the second storm, the highest gust was of 200 km/h (120 mph) at Île de Ré in France.

=== 2000–2009 ===
Name (other name)	Dates	Minimum pressure	Meteorological history
Oratia	30 October–5 November 2000	941 hPa (27.8 inHg)	A deep area of low pressure swept across the United Kingdom bringing gusts in excess of 90 mph (140 km/h) and severe flooding to Southern England, it was the strongest system of its kind to hit the UK since the Burns Day Storm of 1990. Contributing to the Autumn 2000 western Europe floods.
Janika	13–16 November 2001	980 hPa (29 inHg)	A severe windstorm hit southern and central Finland, causing damage worth €20 million. Northerly winds trailing the low pressure were exceptionally gusty, with F2 damage on Fujita scale.
Jeanett	25–31 October 2002	975 hPa (28.8 inHg)	A strong windstorm ripped through the British Isles, killing 24. Winds peaked at 95 mph (153 km/h).
Elizabeth	19–20 November 2004		A storm with 170–200 km/h (110–120 mph) wind speed hit the Tatras National Park in Slovakia killed a driver and destroyed 12,600 ha (31,000 acres) of protected forests changing the landscape forever. The estimated damage is €194,966,211.
Dagmar	16–20 December 2004	983 hPa (29.0 inHg)	A storm generating 130 km/h (80 mph) winds hit northern France, including Paris, killing 6 people and leaving thousands of homes without power.
January 2005	5–12 January 2005	961 hPa (28.4 inHg) 944 hPa (27.9 inHg)	Erwin (Gudrun) 5–12 January 2005. Northern Europe was hit by the storm Erwin (Free University of Berlin), also called Gudrun by the Norwegian weather service, with sustained wind speeds of 126 km/h (78 mph) and wind gusts of 165 km/h (103 mph). About 341,000 homes lost power in Sweden and several thousand of these were out of power for many days and even weeks; about 10,000 homes were still without power after three weeks. The international death toll was at least 17. The storm caused a lot of financial damage in Sweden, where the forest industry suffered greatly from damaged trees. In the south, 75 million m^{3} (98 million yd^{3}) of trees blew down. In the space of 6 hrs, 250,000,000 trees were blown down, and after months of hard work, lorries and drivers from across Europe eventually transported the logs to several sites across the south of Sweden. One huge site was situated on a disused airfield, stretched for 2 km (1.2 mi), 14 m (46 ft) in height, and 10 piles in width. This was only 2% of the total logs stored, enough to create a 3 m × 3 m (9.8 ft × 9.8 ft) pile all the way to Australia.; Gero 10–19 January 2005 On the evening of the 11th and early morning of the 12th, a ferocious gale swept across Northern Ireland and northwest Scotland. Wind speeds of 134 mph (216 km/h) (equivalent to a weak Category 4 hurricane) were recorded on North Rona and wind speeds in excess of 110 mph (180 km/h) measured on South Uist with 105 mph (169 km/h) on Barra in the Hebrides before the automatic station stopped reporting at 17:00 UTC. Surface pressure reached a minimum of 946 mb (27.9 inHg) to the west of Scotland. Stormy seas combined with high spring tides and caused flooding in low-lying coastal areas. One fatality occurred in Ireland and six in Scotland, including a family of five who were swept into the sea after fleeing their house on South Uist. At the height of the storm, 85,000 households in Scotland were without power. On the 13th, all Caledonian MacBrayne ferry services and train services in Scotland were suspended, and many roads were closed due to fallen trees. The Forth Road Bridge was closed for the first time since the 1998 Boxing Day Storm, and the Tay (Dundee) and Friarton (Perth) bridges were also closed to all traffic.
Renate	2–8 October 2006	999 hPa (29.5 inHg)	A powerful storm battered the south west coast of France with gusts of 150 km/h (93 mph) in the coastal areas. The storm uprooted many trees, and many homes remained without power for many hours. Two people were badly injured in a helicopter crash. One person died in a house fire, which originated from a candle that he was using for illumination.
Britta	29 October–4 November 2006	979 hPa (28.9 inHg)	In the afternoon of the second and in the night a storm made its way through the North Sea with gusts reaching 174 mph (280 km/h) in Denmark and southern Sweden. The countries affected were Denmark, Sweden, Norway, Germany and Scotland. The storm killed 15 people and detached an oil rig, which then was rescued and pulled back to safety.
Franz	10–13 January 2007	951 hPa (28.1 inHg)	A strong depression north of Scotland brought high winds to most of the United Kingdom. A strong jet stream was also present at the time. This system was one of several strong storms to hit the United Kingdom during the winter of 2006–2007, linked to the strong North Atlantic Oscillation event taking place at the time. With a central pressure of 951 hPa (28.1 inHg), sustained winds exceeded 60 mph (97 km/h) and a gust of 94 mph (151 km/h) was recorded in Benbecula late on 10 January. Additional hurricane-force gusts were recorded in Scotland. Gale-force winds were recorded in the south of the United Kingdom and in the Midlands, and gusts of over 50 mph (80 km/h) affected the entire country. Northern areas received gusts of between 60 and 90 mph (97 and 145 km/h). The depression was named Franz by the Free University of Berlin. Six fatalities have been confirmed, along with several injuries. Five people were killed when a trawler sank off the coast near Wexford, in Ireland and another person was killed near Taunton, Somerset when a tree crushed his car. Another trawler went missing. Two survivors were recovered. One woman went missing after falling overboard on a ferry near Falmouth. A supermarket in Wales had its roof damaged, and residents across the United Kingdom reported other minor damage. 80,000 homes lost power in Wales. Flooding occurred in several areas, with several rivers overflowing. The Environment Agency issued 59 flood warnings.
Hanno (Per)	9–16 January 2007	965 hPa (28.5 inHg)	The powerful storm Per hit south-western Sweden with wind gusts up to about 140 km/h (90 mph). Six people were reported dead in different storm-related accidents, thousands of trees were blown down, and thousands of households lost electricity. This storm also caused damage and flooding in Lithuania.
Kyrill	17–23 January 2007	963 hPa (28.4 inHg)	In the wake of Kyrill, already regarded as one of the most violent and destructive storms in more than a century, storm-warnings were given for many countries in western, central and northern Europe with severe storm-warnings for some areas. Schools in particularly threatened areas had been closed by mid-day, to allow children to get home safely before the storm reached its full intensity in the late afternoon. At least 53 people were killed in northern and central Europe, causing travel chaos across the region. Britain and Germany were the worst hit, with eleven people killed as rain and gusts of up to 99 mph (159 km/h) with sustained windspeeds of up to 73 mph (117 km/h) swept the UK. Thirteen people were killed in Germany, with the weather station on top of the Brocken in the Saxony-Anhaltian Harz mountain range recording wind speeds of up to 195 km/h (121 mph). Direct damage in Germany was estimated to amount to €4.7bn. Five people were killed in the Netherlands and three in France. The gusts reached 151 km/h (94 mph) at the Cap Gris Nez and 130 km/h (81 mph) in many places in the north of France. In both Germany and the Netherlands the national railways were closed. At Frankfurt International Airport over 200 flights were cancelled.
Uriah	23 June–1 July 2007	980 hPa (29 inHg)	A rather unseasonal weather system brought gale-force winds to the UK, but was more memorable for causing severe flooding, with many areas receiving more than a months' rainfall in a single day. The storm exacerbated existing flooding problems (caused by violent thunderstorms a week earlier) and areas such as Sheffield were worst affected. Over 102 flood warnings were issued, and by 29 June, five people were dead, many areas flooded and there was severe damage to the Ulley reservoir, where cracks appeared in the dam wall, causing fears that it might collapse. 700 people were evacuated from the area. Over 3000 properties were flooded across the country and more than 3,500 people were evacuated from their homes. See June 2007 United Kingdom floods.
Tilo (Andrea)	6–11 November 2007	974 hPa (28.8 inHg)	A strong European windstorm struck Northern Scotland. All schools in Orkney were closed and hundreds of homes lost power. Gusts as high as 90 mph (140 km/h) were reported, along with early snow for the Scottish highlands. The Northlink ferry company cancelled sailings between Lerwick and Aberdeen. There were also reports of trees and roofs being blown down, such as in Grampian. The combination of Northwesterly winds exceeding 60 mph (97 km/h), low pressure and high spring tides led authorities to expect severe flooding in the east of England, to close the Thames Barrier. Many said that these conditions mirrored the North Sea Flood of 1953. In the Netherlands, the Eastern Scheldt storm surge barrier and the gigantic Maeslantkering (sealing off the Rotterdam harbor) were closed. For the first time since 1976, the entire coastline was put on alert and under round-the-clock surveillance. The tidal surge traveling down the North Sea turned out to be too weak to cause any significant problems to the strong Dutch coastal defenses.
Paula	24–27 January 2008	971 hPa (28.7 inHg)	A strong European windstorm, Paula hit Poland, Germany, Austria, Denmark, Norway and Sweden. At least one person died in Poland. The gusts reached 165 km/h (103 mph) in the Eastern Alps, 155 km/h (96 mph) in Poland, 150 km/h (93 mph) in Norway and 140 km/h (87 mph) in Germany.
Emma	28 February–7 March 2008	959 hPa (28.3 inHg)	A strong European windstorm, Emma hit Germany, Austria, Czech Republic and Poland. At least 12 people died. The gusts reached 190 km/h (120 mph) in Eastern Alps, 170 km/h (110 mph) in Poland and 140 km/h (87 mph) in Germany and Czech Republic. The results were catastrophic.
Klaus	23–27 January 2009	963 hPa (28.4 inHg)	A European windstorm that hit southern France and northern Spain, said to be the most damaging in the area since that of December 1999. The storm caused widespread damage across the countries, especially in northern Spain. Twelve fatalities have been reported as of 24 January, as well as extensive disruptions of public transport. Many homes lost power, including over a million in southwestern France. The gusts reached 206 km/h (128 mph). Wildfires were also in Catalonia and Benidorm.
Quinten	8–13 February 2009	975 hPa (28.8 inHg)	Severe windstorm across France, the Benelux and Germany in early February. Highest winds were recorded at the Feldberg-Mountain (Black Forest), Germany. Here the gusts reached 166 km/h (103 mph).

=== 2010–2018 ===
Name (other name)	Dates	Season	Minimum pressure	Meteorological history
Storm Xynthia	26 February–7 March 2010		967 hPa (28.6 inHg)	A severe windstorm which was generated close to Madeira and from there moved across to the Canary Islands, then Portugal and much of western and northern Spain, before moving on to hit western and southwestern France. The highest gust speeds recorded as of midnight were at approximately 21:30 UTC at Alto de Orduña (228 km/h [142 mph]). 50 people have been reported to have died.
Storm Becky Storm Carmen	7–19 November 2010		951 hPa (28.1 inHg)	Becky originated from a low-pressure area that formed off the southeast coast of Greenland on 7 November 2010. It moved rapidly towards the United Kingdom, deepening to 960 hPa (28 inHg) on 8 November. While Becky was making landfall on Cornwall on 9 November, a low-pressure area over Nova Scotia was named Carmen. By 10 November, Becky had weakened and become more elongated, Carmen had moved offshore and began strengthening. On 11 November, Becky had been absorbed by Cyclone Anneli and Carmen had rapidly deepened to 965 hPa (28.5 inHg). Carmen strengthened slightly on 12 November, while centred just offshore Aberdeen, Scotland. On 13 November, it was centred over Scandinavia. It had split into two vortexes by that time. It began moving rapidly to the northeast, and moved out of the Free University of Berlin's tracking charts on 16 November.
Ex-Hurricane Katia	11–18 September 2011		954 hPa (28.2 inHg)	A tropical depression formed near the Cape Verde Islands in late-August, and strengthened into a Category 4 hurricane on 5 September. However, it later weakened rapidly to a Category 1 the next day. It later struck the United Kingdom with near hurricane-force winds and moved across the rest of northern Europe in the next few days. The remnants of Katia killed a man when a tree blew down on his car. A maximum gust of 132 km/h (82 mph) was recorded, and caused widespread power outages throughout Europe, as far east as Russia.
Storm Berit (Storm Xaver)	22–29 November 2011		944 hPa (27.9 inHg)	A tropical wave that developed east of the Lesser Antilles was first noted for a 10% chance of becoming a tropical or subtropical cyclone by the National Hurricane Center on 19 November. The center then said on 21 November that the wave had a 60% chance of becoming a subtropical cyclone, and was also gaining frontal characteristics. The system then acquired extratropical features and on 22 November, it was named Xaver by the Free University of Berlin. Xaver then began a rapid strengthening phase, and deepened almost 30 to 944 mb (0.89 to 27.88 inHg). Wind gusts reached 184 km/h (114 mph) in the Faroe Islands causing widespread damage. One woman died after her car got blown into a loch in Scotland.
Storm Friedhelm (Hurricane Bawbag)	7–13 December 2011		956 hPa (28.2 inHg)	The system that would become Friedhelm formed over the Labrador Sea on 5 December 2011 with a central pressure of 997 mb (29.4 inHg). As the system moved into the North Atlantic Ocean, it was named Friedhelm by the Free University of Berlin. On 8 December at midnight, Friedhelm was located west of the British Isles with a central pressure of 977 mb (28.9 inHg). By the next day, 9 December, the large system was located over the North Sea with a deep central pressure of 956 mb (28.2 inHg). Friedhelm then weakened as it moved over Scandinavia. In preparation for the storm, the Met Office issued a red wind warning for the Scottish Central Belt. Most schools in Scotland were closed by lunchtime. The Forth, Tay, Erskine and Skye Bridges were all closed due to strong winds. The summit of CairnGorm recorded a gust up to 165 mph (266 km/h), also recording sustained winds up to 105 mph (169 km/h). As the storm moved into Scandinavia, the Swedish Meteorological Institute issued a Class 2 warning. The storm was named Friedhelm on 7 December by the Free University of Berlin and was named Bawbag in Scotland, which became the most common name.
Storm Hergen	11–19 December 2011		946 hPa (27.9 inHg)	On 11 December 2012, an area of low pressure emerged over the northwestern Atlantic Ocean near Newfoundland. By the next day, Hergen intensified rapidly as it sped across the Atlantic, deepening to 980 mb (29 inHg). Bombing occurred within the center of the storm and it attained peak intensity on 13 December with a central pressure of 945 mb (27.9 inHg), equivalent to a category 4 hurricane. Hergen was so strong that it had absorbed the circulation of another low named 'Gunther'. By this time, the Cairn Gorm weather station had recorded a 111 mph (179 km/h) wind gust. As Hergen moved northeastwards, it began to weaken while located over the Shetland Isles on 14 December. The storm remained stationary until 16 December offshore the west coast of Norway. The vortex continued to weaken until it dissipated on 20 December.
Storm Joachim	15–21 December 2011		968 hPa (28.6 inHg)	A low-pressure area formed north of Puerto Rico on 13 December and rapidly moved towards Europe. The storm caused power outages and travel disruption in France, Germany, and Switzerland.
Storm Patrick	24–27 December 2011		964 hPa (28.5 inHg)	Formed as secondary low to Cato, affecting central Norway, Sweden and Finland. A F2 tornado was reported in Hellesylt, Norway.
Storm Ulli	31 December 2011–6 January 2012		952 hPa (28.1 inHg)	A weak low pressure system formed over the Mid-west of the United States on 30 December. This low moved into the Atlantic Ocean the next day and was named Ulli by the FU-Berlin. On 2 January, the Met Office began issuing weather warnings for most of the country. Blizzard warnings were issued for northern Scotland, while a heavy rain advisory was issued for southern England. SkyWarn UK also issued their first Particularly Dangerous Situation warning of the year, along with a severe weather warning. The storm rapidly deepened 9 millibars in just less than six hours. One person was killed after an oak tree fell on his car. This storm was described as the worst in Scotland since the Boxing Day Storm of 1998 by the UK Met Office.
Storm Andrea	3–9 January 2012		966 hPa (28.5 inHg)	Closely following Cyclone Ulli, the first named storm of 2012 formed southwest of Iceland, moving down into the North Sea affecting UK, Netherlands, Denmark and Germany.
Storm Gong	18–24 January 2013		968 hPa (28.6 inHg)	An explosively deepening cyclone from the Atlantic brought high wind to Portugal. The cities of Lisbon and Porto registered wind gusts of 29 and 32.3 m/s (104 and 116 km/h; 65 and 72 mph). Widespread fallen trees and power cables left more than 1 million people without power.
Storm Christian (St. Jude Storm)	26–31 October 2013		965 hPa (28.5 inHg)	Named after the feast of Saint Jude the Apostle on 28 October, impact N Europe from 27 October. The storm was widely reported in the British press on 25 October, with predicted intensity comparisons made to the Great storm of 1987 and the Burns' Day storm of 1990. It hit the UK, and parts of northern Europe with gusts of up to 190 km/h (120 mph) recorded in Denmark. More than 10 people were killed in the storm.
2013 Nordic storms	13 November – 19 December 2013		971 hPa (28.7 inHg)	A series of storms affected the Nordic Nations during November and December as high pressure over Europe directed westerly flow over the Atlantic to Northern Europe.: Hilde (Otto/Eino) – 13–19 November 2013. 971 hPa (28.7 inHg). The Norwegian meteorological institute issued an extreme weather warning over Hilde, expecting gusts up to 45 m/s (160 km/h; 100 mph) to hit central Norway on 16 November.; Oskari (Vincenc) – 29 November – 4 December 2013. 976 hPa (28.8 inHg). Named by the Finnish Meteorological Institute.; Ivar (Seija) – 10–17 December 2013. 977 hPa (28.9 inHg). With a route and intensity similar to Hilde, Ivar once again brought hurricane-force winds to central Norway. In Sweden the storm left 55,000 across Norrland without power. Near record level winds were reported from Finland, where 200,000 were left without power. Estonia saw winds up to 115 km/h (71 mph) and 45,000 homes without electricity.; Zaki – 12–16 December 2013 and Adam 14–19 December 2013. 952 hPa (28.1 inHg). Faroese authorities measured at Oyndarfjørður on the island of Eysturoy extreme gusts measured at 73.9 m/s (266 km/h; 165 mph) which, according to official measurements may be a new record, higher than 66.9 m/s (241 km/h; 150 mph) recorded at Mykines in March 1997. Though local orographic effects may prevent this wind speed reaching the record books.
Storm Xaver	4–11 December 2013		962 hPa (28.4 inHg)	Force 12 winds were forecast over the North Sea on 5 December. The system impacted densely populated areas in the UK, Denmark, Sweden, Germany and Poland. In Denmark, the storm was named Bodil.
2013–2014 Atlantic winter storms in Europe	17 December 2013–20 February 2014		927 hPa (27.4 inHg)	Bernd (Emily) – 17–21 December 2013. 941 hPa (27.8 inHg). An area of low pressure from the Atlantic brought wind gusts to the west of Ireland of 133 km/h (83 mph) causing power outages to 22,000 homes, and widespread disruption. Eight people were injured with one fatality reported in the country. The low also brought strong winds across Scotland and areas of England where one person was reported missing after falling from a cargo ship into the river Trent. Flood warnings were also raised across Scotland and Southwest England.; Dirk – 21–28 December 2013. 927 hPa (27.4 inHg). The UK Met Office issued national severe weather warnings for wind and rain across southwest and northern areas of the UK for 23 and 24 December.; Erich – 25 December 2013 – 1 January 2014. 945 hPa (27.9 inHg).; Weather fronts associated with the lows Felix and Gerhard passed over the UK (30–31 December and 2 January), which brought further rainfall and some stormy conditions.; Anne – 1–6 January 2014. 949 hPa (28.0 inHg). Anne was a winter storm that affected western Europe bringing storm surges along the coasts of France and the United Kingdom on high spring tides a month after Cyclone Xaver brought surges during the previous peak tides to northern Europe.; Christina – 3–10 January 2014. 934 hPa (27.6 inHg). An area of low pressure responsible for a winter storm in the US and Canada moved over the Atlantic and was named Christina by the Free University Berlin on 3 January.; Nadja (Brigid) – 29 January – 5 February 2014. 945 hPa (27.9 inHg). Coastal flooding and damaging seas from Scotland to Spain, reports of a missing teenager in northern Spain and woman washed away on the south coast of the UK.; Petra – 3–8 February 2014. 950 hPa (28 inHg). Another coastal event with high seas washing away the railway line at Dawlish, Devon closing the Exeter to Plymouth line. Coastal flooding and high waves from Ireland to Spain, with Cork flooded again. The Cargo ship Luno is washed ashore and breaks in two near Bayonne, France raising fears of a pollution incident.; Qumaira – 4–8 February 2014. 975 hPa (28.8 inHg). 36 French departments were placed on orange alert, with further flooding across Brittany, a wind gust of 128 km/h (80 mph) was recorded at I'lle d'Yeu, Vendée.; Ruth (Charlie) – 6–11 February 2014. 945 hPa (27.9 inHg). Mumbles, near Swansea recorded a high wind of 78 mph (126 km/h), Ciloerwent in Powys recorded a rainfall total of 32 mm (1.3 in) over 12 hours.; Stephanie – 8–15 February 2014. 981 hPa (29.0 inHg). Taking a more southerly track than most recent areas of low pressure, impacting the Iberian Peninsula and southern France before heading across the Mediterranean towards Italy. The Portuguese weather institute put the entire coast of Portugal on red alert on account of expected high seas and gale-force winds.; Tini (Darwin) – 10–17 February 2014. 960 hPa (28 inHg). The UK Met Office issued a rare red warning of wind for North Wales and north western England. Met Eireann issued a red alert for southwest Ireland in counties Cork and Kerry.; Ulla – 12–20 February 2014. 960 hPa (28 inHg). In the UK the winds from Ulla were weaker than from Tini. Thirty people were evacuated from a waterfront restaurant in Milford during a Valentine's Day meal after the windows were smashed down by high seas and winds. 140,000 without power in the wake of the storm in the UK.
Nordic Spring Storms	8–24 March 2014			The first three weeks of March 2014 saw areas of low pressure repeatedly cross Norway from the North Atlantic, coming in from the Norwegian Sea across to the Barents Sea. These storms brought with them warm and humid/moist air from the south west.: Jorun (Norway) (unnamed by FUB) – In early March high pressure built over UK and western Europe for first time in months (since December), directing the Atlantic storm path to the north. An area of low pressure designated extreme weather and named Jorun by Norwegian Meteorological Institute on 8 March 2014 brought hurricane-force winds to northern Norway.; Kyrre (Norway) – Another extreme weather event named by Norwegian Meteorological Institute as Kyrre affected north (Nordland and Troms) Norway on 13–14 March with extreme precipitation and wind. Up to 90 mm (3.5 in) fell in 24 hours, flooding, landslides and closing roads in Nordland and Troms.; Carl (DMI) Ev (FUB) – 14–15 March. An intense low pressure brought high winds which damaged buildings and forestry in southern Norway on 14 March, with Hordaland recording the strongest winds in 20 years. though the low didn't reach hurricane strength in Denmark. Investigated by Perils AG and non-qualifying (losses less than €200 million).; Pentti (FMI) Hannelore III (FUB) – On 21–22 March, an area of low pressure drew across western Norway. In Hordaland and Sogn og Fjordane many places saw more than 100 mm (3.9 in) of precipitation in 24 hours, resulting in several landslides, which among other things led to five homes being evacuated in Nordheimsund. From 24 March an area of high pressure began to build across southern and mid Norway. The low passed over Finland leaving 20,000 without power.
Storm Lena	7–11 August 2014		985 hPa (29.1 inHg)	An unusually powerful area of low pressure for the time of year brought record winds to the west of Norway ahead of ex-Hurricane Bertha, the highest gust of 42.0 m/s (151 km/h; 94 mph) was recorded at Kråkenes Lighthouse.
Storm Alexandra Storm Billie	7–15 December 2014		950 hPa (28 inHg); 975 hPa (28.8 inHg)	Explosive cyclogenesis over North Atlantic brought severe winds, flooding and thunderstorms to the northwestern parts of the UK. More than 30 000 households were left without power.; A secondary low to Alexandra named Billie by FUB was named by SMHI as Alexander formed over southern England and developed en route to the Baltic region. Two people were killed in Germany.
Storm Elon Storm Felix	7–11 January 2015		955 hPa (28.2 inHg)	Elon (Dagmar) A gust of 113 mph (182 km/h) was recorded in Stornoway, Isle of Lewis – the strongest gust since the station first began recording in 1970.; Felix (Egon) Also named as extreme weather Nina in Norway.
Storm Ole	6–9 February 2015		965 hPa (28.5 inHg)	Ole named by the Norwegian Meteorological Institute (Othmar FUB, Laina Finland) brought record breaking winds to some locations in Northern Norway and Swedish Lapland.
Storm Niklas	29 March – 3 April 2015		971.4 hPa (28.69 inHg)	Niklas is believed to be one of the strongest storms in Germany in recent years, preceded by the low Mike which also brought hurricane strength winds to Europe. also named Lentestorm (spring storm) by KNMI, affected areas of western and central Europe with widespread disruption to air, shipping and road transport at the end of March 2015. The storm also caused forestry and property damage, power outages, and led to the loss of several lives.
Storm Zeljko	22–30 July 2015		995 hPa (29.4 inHg)	An unusually strong storm developed over the North Sea for the time of year, which according to KNMI is the strongest storm of its type witnessed in the Netherlands during summer.^{(NL)}
Storm Diddú	6–11 December 2015	2015–2016	944 hPa (27.9 inHg)	A severe storm affected Iceland, and was given the local name Diddú on Twitter. The storm brought maximum wind gusts of 72.6 m/s (261 km/h; 162 mph) to the East Iceland weather station at Hallormsstaðaháls, with hurricane-force winds reported from 33 weather stations in the country, and was the worst storm to affect Iceland since 1991.
Storm Egon	12–13 January 2017	2016–2017	981 hPa (29.0 inHg)	Egon was the first storm to surpass the Perils.org reporting threshold of €200 million since storm Niklas in 2015.
Storm Doris	23–28 February 2017	2016–2017	974 hPa (28.8 inHg)	
Storm Zeus	5–8 March 2017	2016–2017	996 hPa (29.4 inHg)	Zeus affected France on a trajectory stretching from Brittany to the Italian border. Zeus was not named by a national meteorological agency but was widely used in French media, believed to be a misappellation of another low named by the Free University of Berlin charts
Storm Xavier	4–6 October 2017	2017–2018	985 hPa (29.1 inHg)	
Ex-Hurricane Ophelia	16–17 October 2017	2017–2018	959 hPa (28.3 inHg)	
Storm Herwart	28–29 October 2017	2017–2018	970 hPa (29 inHg)	
Storm Eleanor	2–3 January 2018	2017–2018	966 hPa (28.5 inHg)	
Storm David	18 January 2018	2017–2018	974 hPa (28.8 inHg)	Schiphol closed. Record winds recorded in Rotterdam. Deutsche Bahn cancelled all long-distance services. At least 10 dead in Germany. Record winds recorded at Brocken: 203 km/h (126 mph). Damage estimated at €1 billion to €2.6bn. Deutsche Bahn has decided to hire an additional 150 foresters because of damaged incurred by the storm.

=== Since 2019 ===
Official name	Formed	Dissipated	Season	Minimum pressure	Highest wind gust	Damage (GBP/EUR)	Areas affected	Notes
Ex-Hurricane Lorenzo	23 September 2019	4 October 2019	2019–2020	954 hectopascals (28.2 inHg)	101 miles per hour (163 km/h)	£284 million / €330 million	West Africa, Cape Verde, Lesser Antilles, Eastern United States, Azores, United Kingdom, Ireland, France	Formed off the west coast of Africa and intensified into a Category 5 Atlantic hurricane before weakening as it approached the Azores. It transitioned into an extratropical cyclone shortly after.; It was the easternmost Atlantic hurricane on record.
Storm Ciara	07 February 2020	16 February 2020	2019–2020	943 hectopascals (27.8 inHg)	136 miles per hour (219 km/h)	£1.6 billion / €1.9 billion	United Kingdom, Ireland, Isle of Man, Northern Europe, Western Europe, Eastern Europe, Central Europe, Spain	Strong tailwinds and a powerful jet stream helped to break the record for the fastest subsonic flight between New York and the United Kingdom.
Storm Dennis	13 February 2020	19 February 2020	2019–2020	920 hectopascals (27 inHg)	140 miles per hour (230 km/h)	£234 million / €260 million	United Kingdom, Ireland, Iceland, Norway, Sweden, Netherlands, Denmark, Germany	
Storm Ellen	18 August 2020	20 August 2020	2019–2020	966 hectopascals (28.5 inHg)	89 miles per hour (143 km/h)		United Kingdom, Ireland	It was the most powerful extratropical cyclone to hit the British Isles in August on record, with a minimum pressure of 966.4hPa and a maximum sustained wind speed of 111 km/h (69 mph) at County Cork in Ireland.; Another rapidly deepening Atlantic low-pressure system named Storm Francis on 24 August 2020 approached the British Isles less than a week later.
Storm Alex	30 September 2020	3 October 2020	2020–2021	969 hectopascals (28.6 inHg)	116 miles per hour (187 km/h)		United Kingdom, Spain, Portugal, France, Italy, Austria, Poland, Czech Republic	A powerful early-season extratropical cyclone that was particularly notable for its extreme flooding around the Mediterranean.
Storm Malik	28 January 2022	30 January 2022	2021–2022	965 hectopascals (28.5 inHg)	122 miles per hour (196 km/h)	£326.94 million/€382 million	United Kingdom, Ireland, Denmark, Norway, Sweden, Finland, Lithuania, Latvia, Estonia, Germany, Poland, Czech Republic	A powerful wind storm that severely impacted northern and western Europe.; UK wind power generation peaked at 19.5 GW; a new record.
Storm Eunice	17 February 2022	19 February 2022	2021–2022	960 hectopascals (28 inHg)	122 miles per hour (196 km/h)	>£1.57 billion/ > €1.83 billion	United Kingdom, Ireland, Netherlands, Belgium, Germany, Poland, Lithuania, Russia, Belarus	Eunice set a new record for the fastest wind gust recorded in England with 122 miles per hour (196 km/h) at The Needles, Isle of Wight.
Storm Poly	4 July 2023	7 July 2023	2022–2023	987 hectopascals (29.1 inHg)	92 miles per hour (148 km/h)	£42.79 million / >€50 million	United Kingdom, Northern France, Belgium, Netherlands, Germany, Denmark	An extremely violent European windstorm which affected Benelux, Germany, and the United Kingdom during July 2023.; It later became the most intense summer storm to impact the Netherlands, bringing destructive gusts to the nation, peaking at 148 km/h (92 mph) in IJmuiden.
Storm Daniel	4 September 2023	12 September 2023	2022–2023	1,009 hectopascals (29.8 inHg)	55 miles per hour (89 km/h)	£17.03 billion/€19.9 billion	Bulgaria, Egypt, Syria, Greece, Israel, Libya, Turkey	A tropical storm that caused 5,951+ (confirmed) fatalities mainly in Libya from the Derna Dam collapse, with a further 8000 still missing.
Storm Babet	15 October 2023	22 October 2023	2023–2024	977 hectopascals (28.9 inHg)	115 miles per hour (185 km/h)	£591.40 million/ €691 million	Denmark, France, Germany, Ireland, Norway, Portugal, Spain, Sweden, United Kingdom	Caused extreme flooding in western Europe, particularly eastern England.
Storm Ciarán	29 October 2023	4 November 2023	2023–2024	951 hectopascals (28.1 inHg)	129 miles per hour (208 km/h) Non-tornadic	£1.64 billion/ €1.91 billion	Ireland, United Kingdom, Channel Islands, Benelux, France, Spain, Czech Republic, Italy	Caused tornadoes across Jersey and Guernsey.
Storm Ingunn	30 January 2024	2 February 2024	2023–2024	941 hectopascals (27.8 inHg)	155 miles per hour (249 km/h)		Norway, United Kingdom, Sweden	A very intense extra-tropical cyclone which impacted northern Europe and the United Kingdom in early 2024.
Storm Éowyn	21 January 2025	27 January 2025	2024–2025	941.9 hectopascals (27.81 inHg)	135 miles per hour (217 km/h)		United Kingdom, Ireland, Norway	An extremely powerful and record-breaking storm that impacted the British Isles and Norway.
Storm Amy	1 October 2025	6 October 2025	2025–2026	942 hectopascals (27.8 inHg)	139 miles per hour (224 km/h)		Belgium, Denmark, France, Ireland, Netherlands, Norway, Sweden, United Kingdom	Strongest storm in terms of central pressure to hit the United Kingdom in October.; 559,665+ power outages across western and northern Europe.
Storm Johannes	26 December 2025	29 December 2025	2025–2026	985 hectopascals (29.1 inHg)	76 miles per hour (122 km/h)		Norway, Sweden, Finland, the Baltics	A powerful hurricane-forced polar low that caused massive power failure. At the peak, approximately 200,000 households were without power across Sweden, Norway, and Finland.
Storm Goretti	6 January 2026	10 January 2026	2025–2026	969 hectopascals (28.6 inHg)	132 miles per hour (212 km/h)		United Kingdom, Channel Islands, France, Belgium, Netherlands, Germany, Spain (indirectly)	An extremely powerful and destructive extratropical cyclone which was the worst to impact Cornwall in recent decades.; A sting jet was probable, which could have caused 99 miles per hour (159 km/h) being officially recorded, with higher unofficial winds recorded in parts of the south west.; 80% of trees on St Michael's Mount were lost as a result of the storm.; 132 miles per hour (212 km/h) winds where recorded in northern France.
Storm Harry	16 January 2026	23 January 2026	2025–2026	995 hectopascals (29.4 inHg)	81 miles per hour (130 km/h)		Canary Islands, Spain, Portugal, France, Algeria, Tunisia, Italy, Malta	A deadly catastrophic extratropical cyclone that was responsible for over 386 deaths across the Mediterranean.
Storm Kristin	27 January 2026	31 January 2026	2025–2026	975 hectopascals (28.8 inHg)	129.74 miles per hour (208.80 km/h)	£6.16 billion/ >€7.2 billion	Portugal, Spain, Gibraltar, Morocco, Italy, Greece, the Balkans, Ukraine	A extremely powerful, but compact extratropical cyclone, Portugal's costliest & strongest storm on record. By exceeding the wind speeds of both Cyclone Xola in 2009 and Hurricane Leslie in 2018, the storm caused catastrophic damage.; The extreme wind gusts are attributed to a probable sting jet that developed as the system made landfall.
Storm Boelo	22 October 2026	26 October 2026	2026–2027	945 hectopascals (27.9 inHg)	112 miles per hour (180 km/h)		United Kingdom, Ireland, Norway	Provisionally the joint sixth-wettest day for the United Kingdom and sixth-wettest day recorded in Scotland.

== See also ==
- European windstorm
- Extratropical cyclone
- Tropical cyclone effects in Europe
