= 2016–17 UK and Ireland windstorm season =

- First storm formed: 19 November 2016
- Last storm dissipated: 3 March 2017
- Strongest storm^{1}: Barbara – 949 hPa (28.0 inHg)
- Strongest wind gust: 106 mph (171 km/h; 92 kn) Margate, United Kingdom. (20 November)
- Total storms: 5
- Total damage: ≥ £400 million (≥ €450 million)
- Total fatalities: 5
- ^{1}Strongest storm is determined by lowest pressure and maximum recorded non-mountainous wind gust is also included for reference.

The 2016–17 UK and Ireland windstorm season was the second instance of the United Kingdom's Met Office and Ireland's Met Éireann naming extratropical cyclones. Substantially less active than the previous season, the season succeeded the 2015–16 UK and Ireland windstorm season and preceded the 2017–18 European windstorm season.

== Background ==
In 2015, the Met Office and Met Éireann announced a pilot project to name storm warnings as part of the Name our Storms project for wind storms and asked the public for suggestions. The meteorological offices produced a full list of names for 2015–16, common to both the UK and Ireland. A new list of names was released on 19 September for the 2016–17 season. Names in the UK will be based on the National Severe Weather Warning Service, when a storm is assessed to have the potential for an amber 'be prepared' or red 'take action' warning.

- Angus (19–22 November 2016)
- Barbara (22–27 December 2016)
- Conor (23–29 December 2016)
- Doris (21–26 February 2017)
- Ewan (25 February–3 March 2017)
- Fleur (unused)
- Gabriel (unused)
- Holly (unused)
- Ivor (unused)
- Jacqui (unused)
- Kamil (unused)
- Louise (unused)
- Malcolm (unused)
- Natalie (unused)
- Oisin (unused)
- Penelope (unused)
- Robert (unused)
- Susan (unused)
- Thomas (unused)
- Valerie (unused)
- Wilbert (unused)

== Seasonal summary ==
Comparison of strongest gusts associated with each storm in the UK and Ireland:

== Storms ==
=== Storm Angus ===
Angus
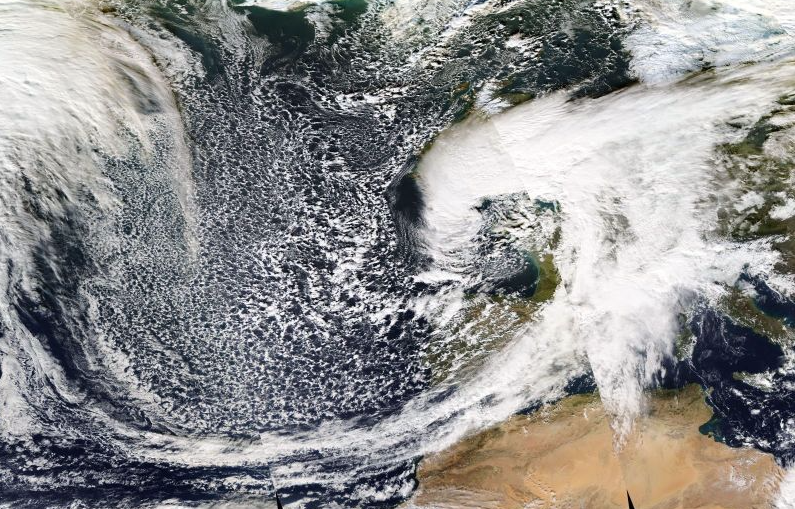
- MODIS image of Angus on 21 November 2016
- Date of impact: 19–22 November
- Maximum wind gust: 106 mph (171 km/h; 92 kn)
- Lowest pressure: 965 hPa (28.5 inHg)
- Fatalities: 2
- Power outages: 1,000
- Damage: ≥ £80 million (≥ €90 million)

Storm Angus was named on 19 November, with southern and southeast England, especially along the Channel coast expected to be the greatest affected areas as the storm moves northeast on 20 November. The storm was known as "Nannette" in France, Germany, Belgium and the Netherlands. Guernsey, in the Channel Islands, were hit with hurricane-force winds with the highest wind gusts since its 1990 record.

The south-west of England was affected with over 1,000 power outages, mostly in Devon. Residents were evacuated due to flooding near South Molton, Devon. Further flooding was reported in Braunton, Bradiford, Devon, and East Bar, Swanage, Dorset. The high winds affected train service in the south-east, ferry crossing at the Port of Dover and the Brighton 10k run.

The National Grid launched an investigation whether a ship's anchor damaged four of the eight cables of the Cross Channel high voltage interconnector during storm Angus, which would leave it only able to operate at half of its capacity until February 2017.

A 39-year-old woman was found in the sea near Folkestone and was airlifted to hospital; she later died. Russell Sherwood, aged 69, had been reported as missing on the day of the storm: a car was found upside-down in the River Ogmore with his body inside on 23 November.

=== Storm Barbara ===
Barbara
- Date of impact: 22–27 December
- Maximum wind gust: 83 mph (134 km/h; 72 kn)
- Lowest pressure: 949 hPa (28.0 inHg)
- Fatalities: 0
- Power outages: 1,000 in Northern Ireland
- Damage: ≥ £80 million (≥ €90 million)

Storm Barbara was named on 20 December. Approximately 1,000 homes were without power in Northern Ireland. Part of a school roof was ripped off at Rhosgadfan near Caernarfon, Gwynedd, while hundreds of homes across Wales experienced power cuts.

=== Storm Conor ===
Conor
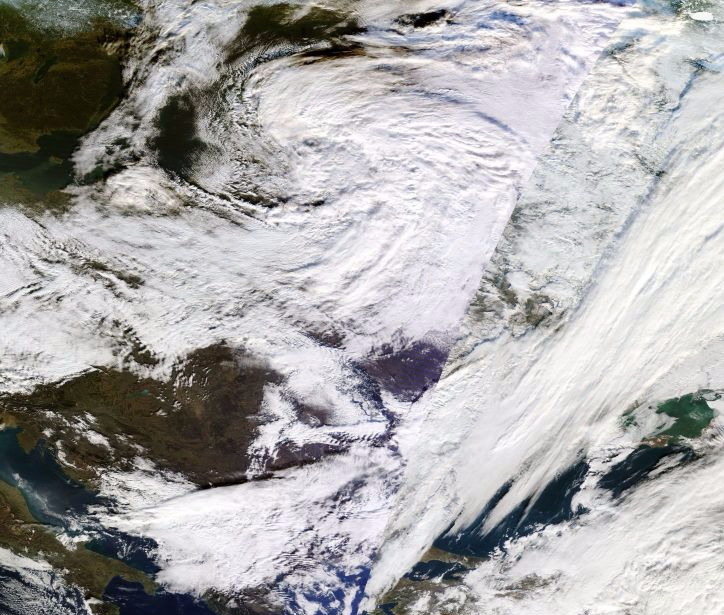
- MODIS image of Conor on 27 December 2016
- Date of impact: 23–29 December
- Maximum wind gust: 85 mph (137 km/h; 74 kn)
- Lowest pressure: 958 hPa (28.3 inHg)
- Fatalities: 0
- Power outages: 1,000
- Damage: ≥ £80 million (≥ €90 million)

Storm Conor was named three days after Barbara on 23 December with mostly amber warnings for the Northern Isles and north Caithness on Boxing Day. Hundreds of homes across Scotland and The Shetland Islands experienced power cuts.

=== Storm Doris ===
Doris
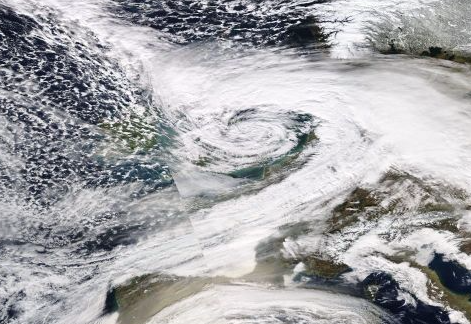
- MODIS image of Doris on 23 February 2017
- Date of impact: 21–26 February
- Maximum wind gust: 94 mph (151 km/h; 82 kn)
- Lowest pressure: 954 hPa (28.2 inHg)
- Fatalities: 3
- Power outages: Almost 50,000
- Damage: ≥ £160 million (≥ €180 million)

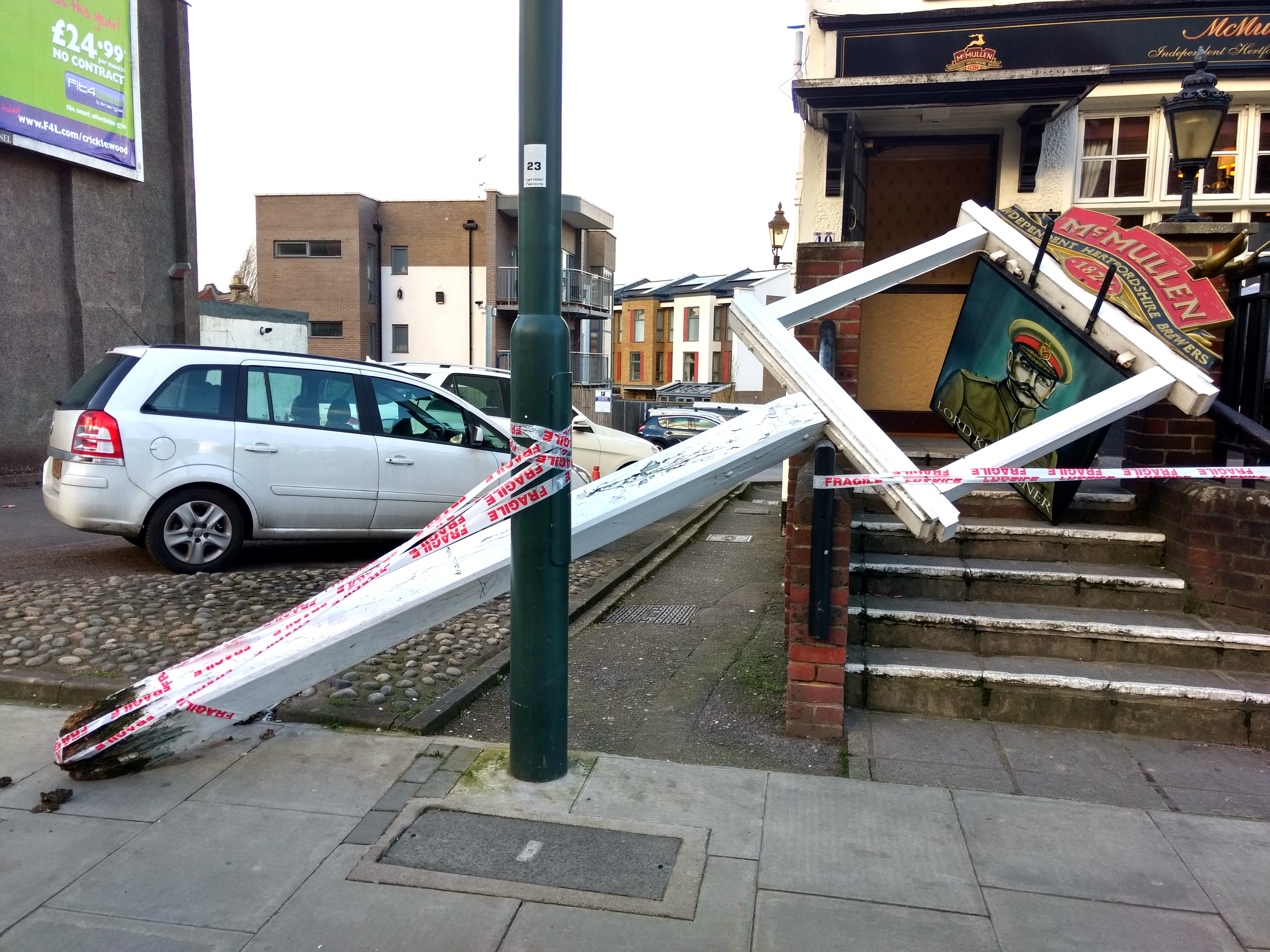
Damage from Storm Doris in New Barnet, London.

Storm Doris was named on 21 February and impacted Ireland, the UK and the Netherlands on 23 February 2017.

A gust of 94 mph (151 km/h; 82 kn) was recorded at Capel Curig, Wales. On its approach the storm strengthened considerably going through a process called bombogenesis, wherein the central pressure of the system fell at a very fast pace; 24 hPa (0.71 inHg) of pressure in 24 hours to 974 hPa (28.8 inHg).

A 32-year-old woman was killed in Swindon when blown with an empty pram into the road. Another woman, Tania Martin, a 29-year-old, died in Wolverhampton when debris fell on her in the street. She was struck by a block of wood ripped off a water tank cover which had been untouched for years by the owners of the Mander Centre, who later had to pay £1m+ in damages to her family. A man in his 80s died in hospital on 26 February after the car he was travelling in was crushed by a falling tree. The Shropshire and Wolverhampton incidents were chronicled in the final episode of the second series of Ambulance, a BBC One documentary programme, the following October.

A girl was seriously injured when a ceiling collapsed on her at the Southwood School in Milton Keynes. On 23 February 2017, during high winds caused by Storm Doris, a Flybe plane (Flight 1284) from Edinburgh to Amsterdam crash landed on the runway at Amsterdam Airport Schiphol: the rear right landing gear collapsed but there were no injuries.

The storm hit the Copeland constituency on polling day of the by-election, which some commentators suggested might reduce turnout.

There was also snow and rain. Road, rail and air travel was disrupted and there were failures in power supply. The storm was described as a weather bomb.

=== Storm Ewan ===
Ewan
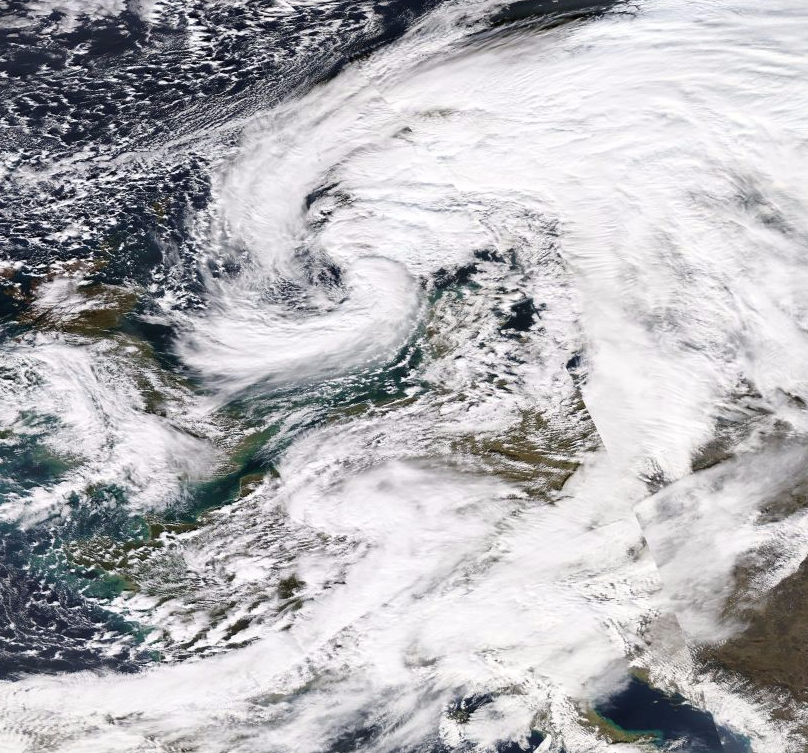
- MODIS image of Ewan on 28 February 2017
- Date of impact: 25 February – 3 March
- Maximum wind gust: 70 mph (110 km/h; 61 kn)
- Fatalities: 0
- Power outages: Limited
- Damage: Unknown

Storm Ewan was named by Met Éireann four days after Doris on 25 February and impacted Ireland on 26 February 2017. Ewan failed to form a low pressure system and damage was limited in Ireland to strong winds on the south coast.

== Season effects ==
This table lists all known windstorms that affected the UK and Ireland during 2016–2017. It includes their name, duration, peak recorded gust (excluding mountain stations), lowest pressure, areas affected, deaths and damage totals from the two nations. All damage figures are in 2016 pounds sterling and euros. The 2016/17 storm season was described as relatively quiet by the reinsurance broker Aon Benfield's Impact Forecasting division in late February.

Storm	Dates active	Highest wind gust	Lowest pressure	Casualties	Damages
Angus	19 – 22 November	106 mph (171 km/h; 92 kn)	965 hPa (28.5 inHg)	2	≥ £80 million (≥ €90 million)
Barbara	20 – 27 December	83 mph (134 km/h; 72 kn)	949 hPa (28.0 inHg)	0	≥ £80 million (≥ €90 million)
Conor	23 – 29 December	85 mph (137 km/h; 74 kn)	958 hPa (28.3 inHg)	0	≥ £80 million (≥ €90 million)
Doris	21 – 26 February	94 mph (151 km/h; 82 kn)	954 hPa (28.2 inHg)	3	≥ £160 million (≥ €180 million)
Ewan	25 February – 3 March	70 mph (110 km/h; 61 kn)	Unknown	0	Unknown
Season Aggregates
5 windstorms	19 November – 3 March	118.6 mph (190.9 km/h; 103.1 kn)	949 hPa (28.0 inHg)	5	≥ £400 million (≥ €450 million)

== Storms named by other European meteorological services ==
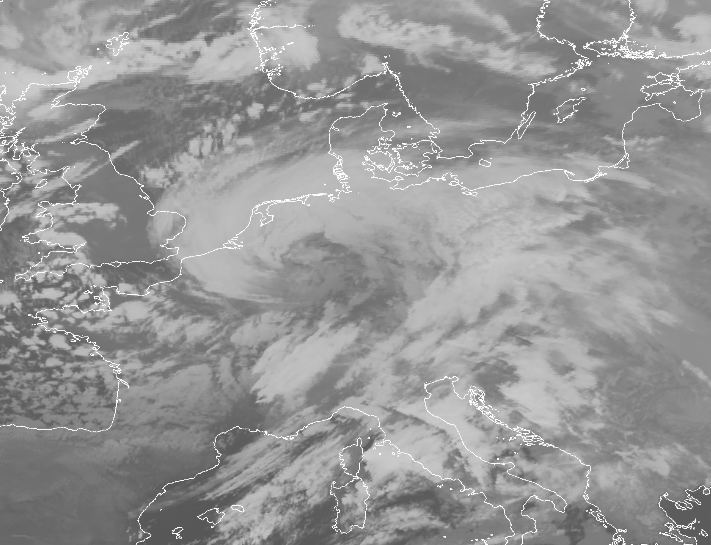
IR satellite image of storm Egon 13 January 2017

During the 2016/17 winter three storms exceeded the Perils.org insured loss reporting threshold of €200 million: Egon, Thomas/Doris, and Zeus.

- Rauli (Fin) Janett (FUB), 27 August.
- Angus (UK/IE) Nannette (FUB), 20 November 2016.
- Barbara (UK/IE) Antje (FUB), 24 December 2016.
- Conor (UK/IE) Barbara (FUB) Urd (NO),^{(da wiki)} 26 December 2016.
- Axel (FUB), 4–5 January 2017.
- Vidar (NO), named for high coastal water levels rather than wind. Caius/Dieter (FUB), UK east coast storm surge 12–13 January 2017.
- Egon (FUB) 12–13 January 2017.
- Leiv (FUB), 3–4 February 2017 (incl. Kurt, Marcel).^{(fr wiki)}
- Doris (UK/IE) Thomas (FUB), 23 February 2017.
- Ewan (UK/IE), Udo III/Volkmar (FUB), 26–27 February 2017.
- "Zeus" (†), Unnamed (FUB), Zeus-Yannik (Perils). 6 March 2017.^{(fr wiki)}

† Zeus was not named by a national meteorological agency but was widely used in French media, believed to be a misappellation of another low named by the Free University of Berlin charts.

== See also ==
- European windstorms
- January 2017 European cold wave
