= Storm Ulysses =

Extratropical cyclone in British Isles in 1903

Storm damage to Morecambe pier

Storm Ulysses was an extratropical cyclone that affected the British Isles in 1903. Modern assessments indicate winds gusted in excess of 100 miles per hour (45 m/s). Significant effects were seen in Dublin, Ireland, where up to 25% of houses were damaged and 3,000 trees uprooted. In England the wind derailed a train in Cumbria, injuring 37 people, and damaged Morecambe's West End Pier. A number of ships were wrecked and perhaps 30 lives lost.

== Origin ==
The period from 18 February 1903 saw several depressions moving close by the western coast of Ireland, from the Atlantic. Storm Ulysses had its origin in a belt of high pressure arising from a warm anticyclone centred over the eastern United States. This sent a succession of cyclone centres across the Atlantic which coalesced as a cyclone north of Iceland. This was estimated by Hubert Lamb and Knud Frydendahl in 1991, to have a low-pressure centre of 940 millibars. The Iceland cyclone drew cold air from the Arctic and led to the intensification of existing cyclone features into Storm Ulysses.

== Effects ==
Storm Ulysses first affected Ireland on 26 February 1903, with winds reaching hurricane speeds (74–94 miles per hour, 33–42 m/s). An anemometer at Dun Laoghaire measured winds of 96 miles per hour (42.9 m/s) between 4:00 am and 4:30 am on 27 February, though later analysis by Met Éireann has downgraded this to around 69 miles per hour (31 m/s). As many as 25% of houses in Dublin suffered damage, particularly to windows, roofs and chimneys. Some 4,000 trees were uprooted in Kilkenny, 2,000 in Birr and 3,000 elms in Phoenix Park, Dublin. Farmers' hayricks were destroyed and some cattle killed.

The storm continued into Northern England and Scotland into 27 February. Wind speeds of 59 knots (68 mph; 30 m/s) were measured at Southport, Lancashire, gusting up to 80 knots (92 mph; 41 m/s). The Furness Railway's harbour master at Barrow-in-Furness, Cumbia, recorded a steady wind of 100 miles per hour (45 m/s) from 4:30 am until 8:00 am with gusts up to 120 miles per hour (54 m/s). At Leven Viaduct near Ulverston, Cumbria, the 10-car passenger and mail train from Carnforth to Barrow-in-Furness was overturned by winds at around 5:30 am after having been halted by damage caused by fallen telegraph cables. The train fell onto an adjacent line, narrowly avoiding falling from the bridge. Thirty-four passengers were injured, one seriously, as well as two railway guards (one seriously) and a Post Office clerk.

It caused several shipwrecks, with the Royal National Lifeboat Institution carrying out at least 10 significant rescue operations. The storm also caused some instances of flooding. In Morecambe, Lancashire, the West End Pier received significant damage and was breached in two places. The storm may have led to more than 30 deaths on land and at sea. The storm passed over Ben Nevis where measurements were taken by a team of resident weathermen. Reporting of the storm was hampered by damage it caused to the telegraph network. The storm passed on to Denmark where strong westerly winds were felt.

== Legacy ==
The storm later received its name from its appearance in James Joyce's 1922 novel Ulysses, which is set in Dublin in 1904. In the novel the character J. J. O'Molloy recounts that "Lady Dudley was walking home through the park to see all the trees that were blown down by that cyclone last year and thought she'd buy a view of Dublin". The damage was comparable to that seen in the Great storm of 1987, the 1990 Burns' Day Storm and the Boxing Day Storm of 1998. In County Kerry it was regarded as the worst storm in memory, in central Ireland as the worst since the 1839 Night of the Big Wind and on the Isle of Man as unprecedented in violence.

== Modern reassessment ==
Digitisation of contemporary records in the late 2010s allowed the Met Office to reassess its modelling of the storm. A 2023 review of the data, following additional digitisation of weather records from across the British Isles, led Professor Ed Hawkins of the University of Reading and the National Centre for Atmospheric Science to conclude "it is likely that the winds were stronger in some locations than anything in the modern period 1950–2015".

The new model includes revision of the low pressure over Eastern Scotland from 967 millibars to 962. The modelling shows the winds at Leven would have exceeded 89 miles per hour (40 m/s), with gusts in some areas exceeding 100 miles per hour (45 m/s). The new model places the storm as one of the four strongest wind events on record in the British Isles.

== See also ==
- List of storms named Ulysses
