= 2013 Nordic storms =

Weather events in Northern Europe

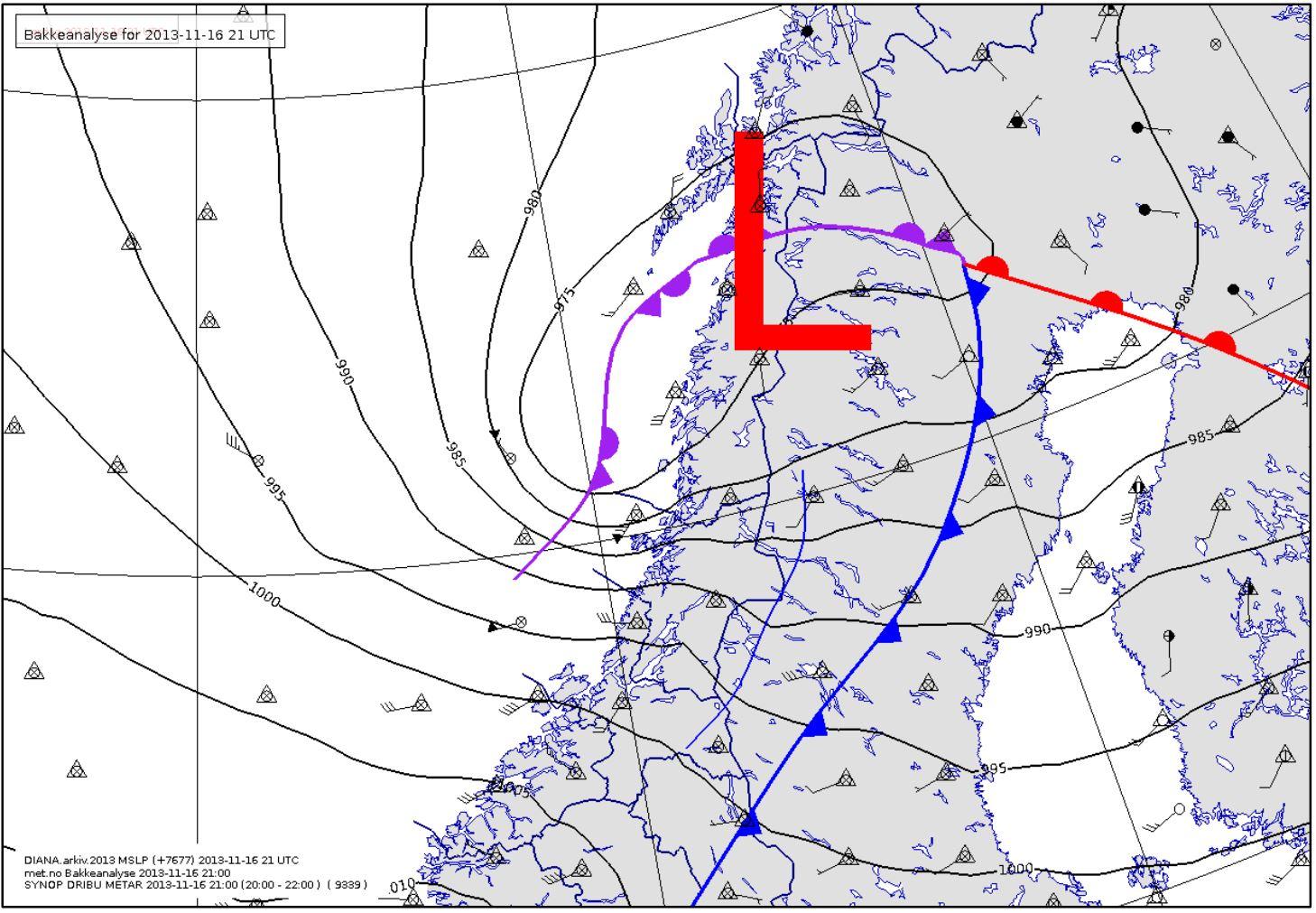
- Synoptic chart of cyclone Hilde, 21 UTC 17 November 2013. Norwegian Meteorological Institute

Meteorological history
- Formed: 15 November 2013
- Dissipated: 19 December 2013

European windstorm, extratropical cyclone

Overall effects
- Areas affected: Norway, Sweden, Finland, Estonia, Russia, United Kingdom, Faroe Islands

2013 Nordic storms were a series of storms affecting predominantly the Nordic nations with other northern European nations also affected. The first storm in the series Hilde, named Otto by Free University of Berlin, and Eino in Finland was an extratropical cyclone affecting parts of northern Europe, causing disruption to electricity supplies and transportation across mid Norway, northern Sweden and central Finland during 15–18 November 2013. The storm brought a new record average wind speed to Sweden (at altitude), however wind speeds at lower altitudes were less than seen during Cyclone Dagmar of 2011. Most damage was caused by falling trees along the storm's path likely exacerbated by unfrozen ground. The total cost of damage is likely to be low, as the storm passed over relatively unpopulated regions of the Nordic nations.

== Meteorological history ==
The storm formed over the Atlantic Ocean to the south of Greenland and west of Newfoundland on 15 November. The storm followed a similar, though more northerly path than Dagmar in 2011. The storm was estimated to be less intense than Dagmar, and the more northerly track would take it over lightly populated regions.

=== Preparation and warnings ===
Before the storm the Swedish Meteorological and Hydrological Institute issued class 1- and class 2-warnings across Norrland. Class 2-warning remained active on 17 November in parts of Västerbotten and Norrbotten. The Finnish Meteorological Institute issued a level 2 warning, that significant wind damage could occur in central Finland, and released advice for the public on how to prepare for strong winds and any potential power outages.

The Norwegian energy company Statoil evacuated 97 people from the drilling platform Njord A as a safety precaution. Hurtigruten ferry sailings along the Norwegian coast were cancelled in preparation for the storm. Railway transport was halted overnight (16 November) in northern Sweden.

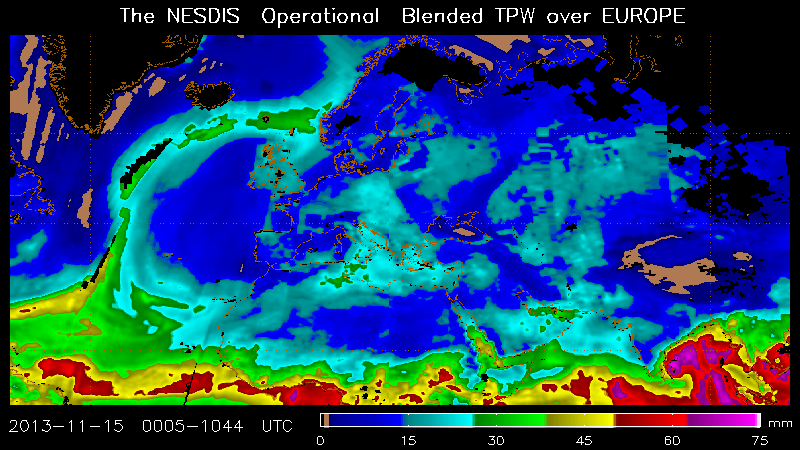
Total Precipitable water over Europe, 15/11/2013

=== Preceding weather ===
Fronts from low pressure area Nikolaus passed over Norway in the 24 hours before Hilde. These fronts brought close to extreme rainfall in Bergen on 15 November, and heavy rain across Western Norway which left many roads impassable as they were closed by landslides and rockfalls overnight 15–16 November.

Norway's second-largest city, Bergen, saw 60 mm of rain fall in 6 hours, Friday afternoon and evening. The calls generated overwhelmed the capacity of the city's emergency lines and Bergen municipality staff set up an alternate number to cope with incoming calls reporting flooding of homes and roads. The rainfall also closed the city's Fløibanen funicular railway for only the second time in 105 years.

On the Norwegian national road 15, a bus from Volda to Oslo was caught in a landslide between Hjelle and Oppstryn around midnight. None of the 35 passengers aboard were hurt but the bus was left stuck within the slide.

High winds across Finnmark in the far north of Norway were reported on 16 November, which led to the evacuation of Hammerfest Airport's tower, and grounding of all air traffic. Wind gusts of 75 knots (139 km/h) were reported on the mountains and 64 knots (119 km/h) at the airport.

== Impact ==
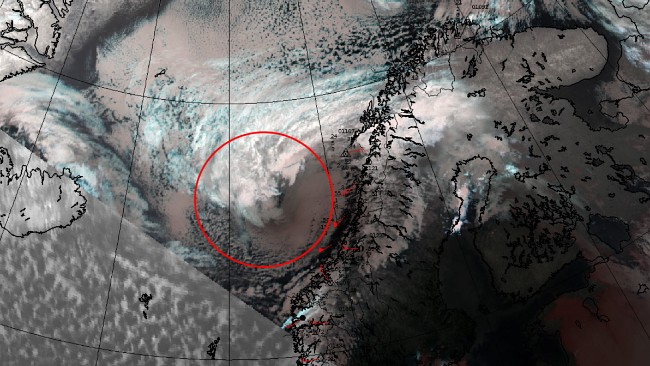
Hilde developing to the west of Norway on the afternoon of 16 November 2013. Norwegian Meteorological Institute

The strongest wind gust in Norway was measured at Nordøyan Lighthouse in Vikna Municipality in Nord Trøndelag at 49 metres per second (180 km/h), with an average windspeed reaching 39 metres per second (140 km/h). At Sklinna Lighthouse average winds of 35 metres per second (130 km/h) were measured with gust speeds of 44 metres per second (160 km/h) in Leka Municipality, Nord Trøndelag. Locally guts over land reached between 40 and 50 metres per second (140 and 180 km/h) with waves of 13–15 m at the coast. Across central Norway high wind blew trees down onto powerlines. In Helgeland the E6 road was closed from the southern county border to the Korgfjell Tunnel. In the city of Trondheim police cordoned off areas of the city centre for public safety.

In Sweden the high altitude weather station at Stekenjokk, in Lappland recorded an average windspeed (10 minutes) of 47 metres per second (170 km/h; 110 mph), which surpassed the record of 44 metres per second (160 km/h; 98 mph) recorded in association with Gudrun in 2005 and another storm in 2–3 March 2011 also recorded at Stekenjokk. The station also recorded the highest gust (2 seconds) ever recorded in November during the storm at 56 metres per second (200 km/h; 130 mph) with the previous monthly record of 55 metres per second (200 km/h; 120 mph) recorded at Tarfala 7 November 2003, The highest ever gust recorded during any month in Sweden is 81 metres per second (290 km/h; 180 mph) recorded 20 December 1992.

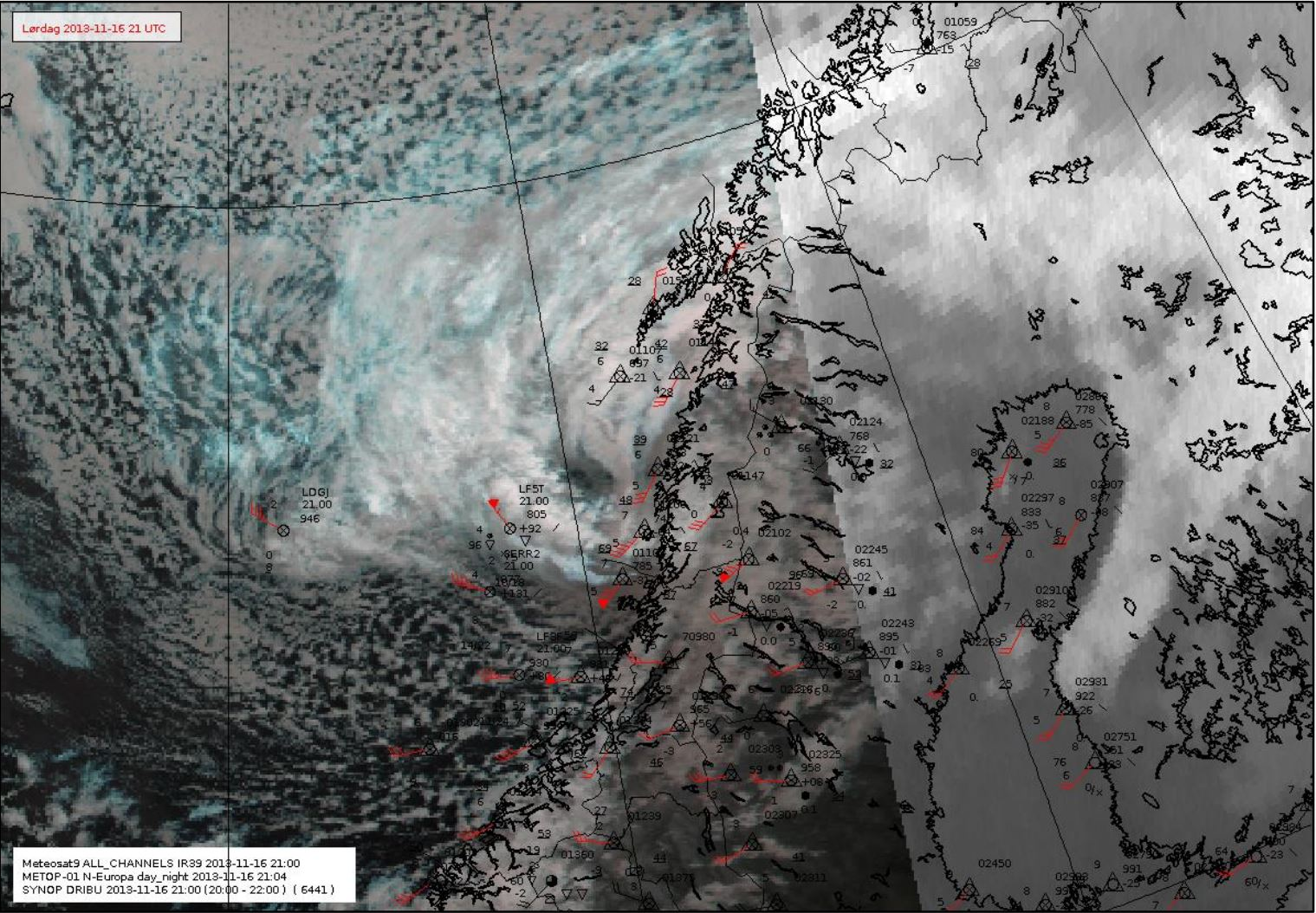
Hilde on the evening of 16 November 2013. Norwegian Meteorological Institute

Inland at lower altitudes the strongest gusts were 29 metres per second (100 km/h; 65 mph) recorded at Vilhelmina, Västerbotten County and Frösön, Jämtland, which were lower than those seen during the Dagmar storm in 2011.

In Norway electricity was cut to 35,000 homes at the height of the storm, mostly in Trøndelag and Helgeland. The storm at its height left 36,000 without electricity in Jämtland, Västernorrland and Västerbotten in Sweden, which had been reduced to 28,000 by mid morning 17 November, with electricity suppliers warning some customers may not be reconnected until Monday 18 November. In Finland, an estimated 230,000 households were without electricity.

Northern Sweden also saw problems with the mobile and land line phone network, with 15,000 customers without land line connections on 17 November, in the towns of Vilhelmina and Dorotea inhabitants had difficulty in reaching the emergency services telephone number. The Norwegian communications company Telenor reported that in Nord-Trøndelag 2,800 broadband and 4,600 fixed line customers were without service and in Nordland 300 broadband customers and 460 fixed line customers were also without service on 18 November. The company also reported difficulties with the mobile phone network in these counties, with over 150 2G base stations down and 60 3G base stations out of service.

In Finland the regions of Häme, Tampere, Ostrobothnia, Satakunta and Savo, were particularly affected, with the storm felling many trees and breaking power lines. In western regions of Finland rail lines were disrupted.

In Russia power outages were reported in the town of Lakhdenpokhya, Republic of Karelia due to the strong winds. Electricity supplies were also cut to 108 villages throughout the Leningrad region, while Saint Petersburg saw electricity lines, billboards, roofing and traffic signals toppled.

The Saint Petersburg Dam was closed in the early morning 17 November with a storm warning in place in the city.

In the Gulf of Finland the closure of the St Petersburg dam left the ferry MS Princess Maria was unable to enter port, waiting out the storm with 2800 passengers on board. Strong winds forced its St. Peter Line sister ferry the MS Princess Anastasia to return to Tallinn harbour.

=== Subsequent storms ===
Several further low pressure systems impacted the Nordic countries immediately after the passage of Hilde.

=== Cyclone Oskari ===
Oskari (Vincenc) – November 29–December 4, 2013. 976 hPa. Named by the Finnish Meteorological Institute. Oskari was stronger than Hilde in Finland, with a maximum gust of 34.7 metres per second (125 km/h) at Märket skerry lighthouse, to the west of Åland.

=== Cyclone Xaver ===
Named Bodil by Danish Meteorological Institute and Sven by SMHI, the storm brought Force 12 winds and heavy snowfall. The storm brought a storm surge to the Irish and North Seas with coastal flooding resulting from what the Environment Agency in the United Kingdom described as the worst storm surge in 60 years. Record water levels were also reported in the Øresund between Sweden and Denmark. Blizzards and severe weather in Sweden and Poland led to several fatalities. The North Sea storm surge on 4–5 December 2013 saw water damage 1,400 buildings and 6,800 hectares (17,000 acres) of land, and caused no direct deaths. This was attributed to the warnings that were issued several days in advance and the improved coastal defences that had been built since the North Sea flood of 1953.

=== Cyclone Ivar (Seija) ===
Ivar named by the Norwegian Meteorological Institute, and Seija by the Finnish Meteorological Institute. unnamed by the FUB. December 10–17, 2013. 977 hPa. With a route and intensity similar to Hilde, Ivar once again brought hurricane-force winds to central Norway. In Norway 50,000 customers were without power. In Sweden the storm left 55,000 across Norrland without power. Near record level winds were reported from Finland, where 200,000 were left without power. Estonia saw winds up to 115 km/h and 45,000 homes without electricity. Described as more powerful than both Hilde and Oskari, but slightly weaker than Cyclone Dagmar of 2011 in Finland. Video of shoppers in Ålesund, Norway, struggling against the wind from the storm was shown widely on internet after becoming a hit on YouTube. Hilde and Ivar brought the worst forest damage to Scandinavia since the New Year's Day Storm of 1992.

=== Cyclones Zaki and Adam ===
Zaki – December 12–16, 2013 and Adam December 14–19, 2013. 952 hPa.
