= West End Pier, Morecambe =

Former pier in Morecambe, England

West End Pier
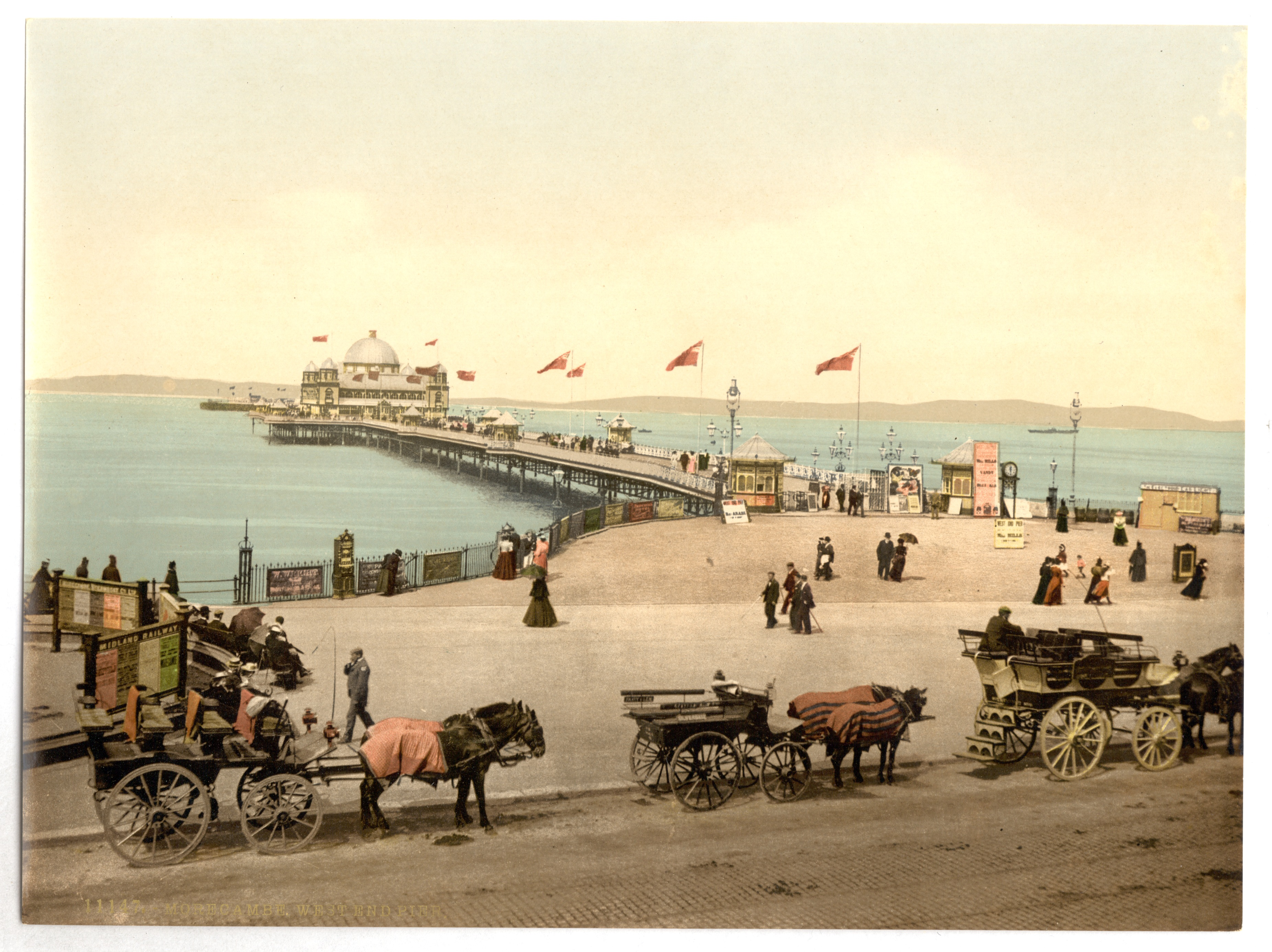
- West End Pier, between 1895 and 1900
- Carries: Pedestrians
- Location: Morecambe
- Coordinates: 54.0677°N 2.8830°W

Characteristics
- Total length: 1,800 feet (550 m)

History
- Designer: J Harker
- Opening date: 3 April 1896; 130 years ago
- Closure date: 1978; 48 years ago
- Location in Morecambe

West End Pier was one of two piers in Morecambe, Lancashire, England, built during the late 19th century to an eventual length of 1,800 feet (550 m) long and officially opened on 3 April 1896 by Colonel William Henry Foster MP. The pier was one of the first structures in the town to be installed with electric lighting in 1899.

The pier suffered storm damage in 1977 and with repair costs of £500,000, the pier was instead demolished the following year.

== Layout ==
Manghall and Littlewood, who were respected engineers from Manchester, proposed the pier should stretch 900 feet (270 m) from the promenade to the pavilion and a total of 1,800 feet (550 m) to the end of the pier head, to create an overall length of around half a mile. The width would be between 25 and 38 feet (7.6 and 11.6 m) with the pier head widening to 200 feet (61 m) to accommodate a bandstand and a landing stage for steamboats. Shops would be located around the outside of a pavilion building that would have a capacity of 2,000 people. The pier consisted of around three acres of decking with a stage that was 30 feet (9.1 m) in depth.

== History ==
=== Planning ===
Proposals for a West End Pier were made in 1878, when the West End Morecambe Pier Company proposed a 3,600 feet (1,100 m) structure. Fourteen years later on 18 November 1892, a consortium of businessmen from Morecambe and Bradford formed the Morecambe (Regent Road, West End) Pier Company with £20,000 (equivalent to £2,197,041 in 2025) in capital. Around the same time, a rival pier company, the Alexandra Road Pier and Pavilion Company, registered on 14 December 1892 with a £50,000 (equivalent to £5,492,603 in 2025) capital and planned to build a promenade pier with a pavilion, concert hall and shops, creating a situation where two rival companies were planning on building a new pier close to the other. In 1893, the Board of Trade intervened and stipulated that both applications would be dismissed unless a mutual agreement between the two companies could be made, on the grounds that each planned pier would intersect with the other. The two companies subsequently met on 8 February 1893 with provisional agreement that one company, the Alexandra Road Pier and Pavilion Company, should take 750 shares in return for withdrawing their application. As part of the agreement, the Regent Road company would pay £100 cash towards expenses incurred by their rival company, give them 500 shares and create a position for one of their directors. The Alexandra Road Pier and Pavilion Company was dissolved on 15 September 1896.

=== Construction ===
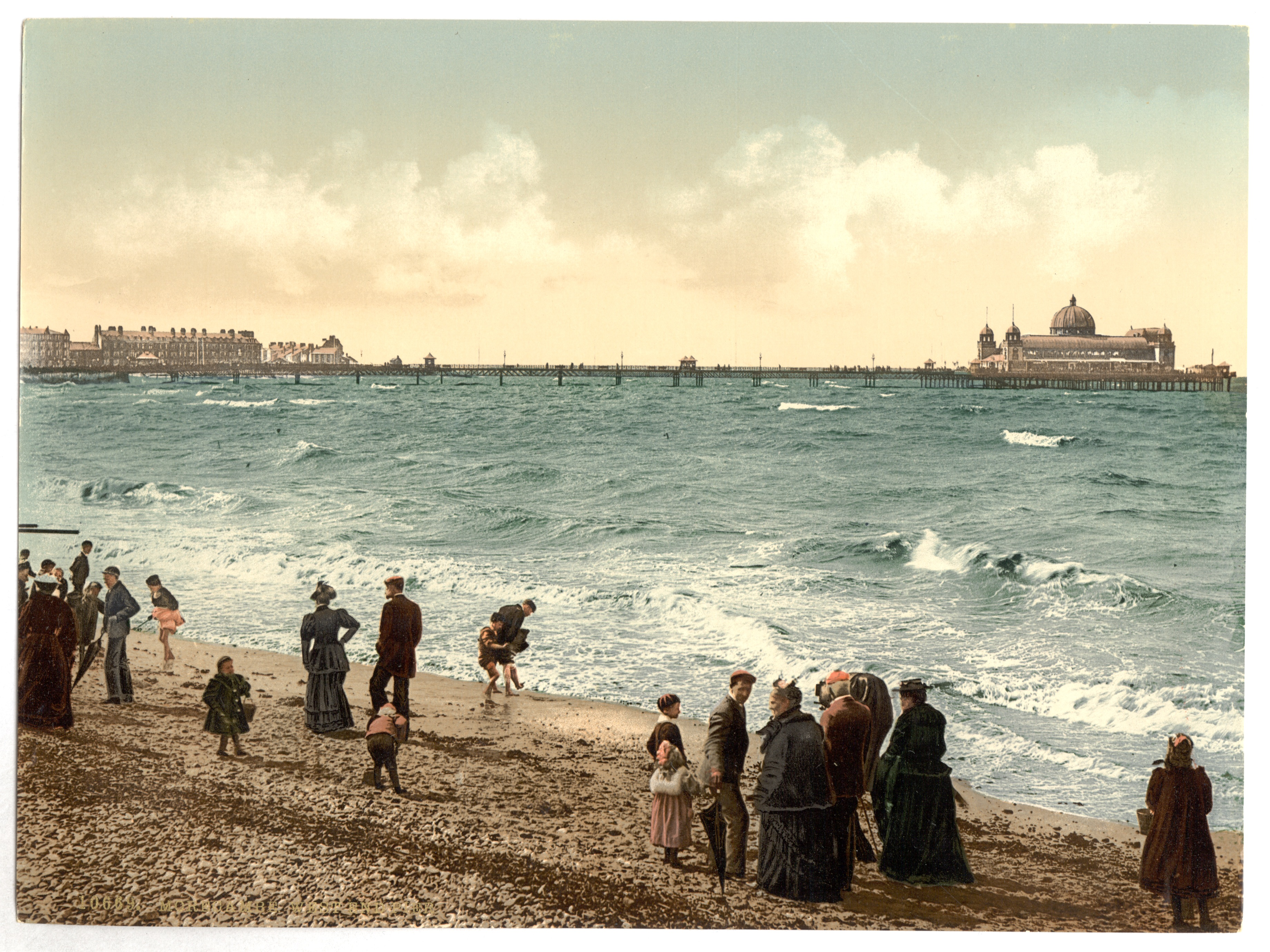
West End Pier, between 1895 and 1900

The Morecambe Pier Order 1893 authorising construction of the pier was given royal assent on 29 June 1893 on the proviso that construction would commence within two years. Now named the West End Pier Company, work began in March 1895 with rapid progress reported by September 1895. For its construction, the pier required 1000 tons of iron, 26 tons of bolts and three tons of nails.

=== Opening ===
The pier was formally opened the following year on 3 April 1896 by Colonel William Henry Foster MP of Hornby Castle. The pavilion had not been completed by the time of the official opening, with work completed around Easter 1897 and following a successful summer, preparations to complete the remainder of the pier were made. The first 200 piles for the landing stage were driven in on 18 November 1897 with the last 198 piles driven in on 23 April 1898 for the pier head. The pier was one of the first structures in the town to be installed with electric lighting in 1899.

=== 20th century ===
1903 storm damage

The pier sustained storm damage in 1903 (Storm Ulysses) and 1907, the latter washing away 180 feet (55 m) of the extension, and a fire in 1917 destroyed the pavilion. By October 1927 following another storm, the length of the pier had been reduced to around 900 feet (270 m), half its originally constructed length.

== Closure and demolition ==
A storm in November 1977 destroyed a third of the pier, isolating the open-air dancing area. With repair costs estimated at £500,000 (equivalent to £2,900,000 in 2025), it was considered too prohibitive and demolition occurred in 1978. No pier was built to replace it.

== See also ==
- Central Pier, Morecambe
