= Cyclone Gudrun =

Powerful storm in northern Europe in 2005

Cyclone Gudrun (Erwin)
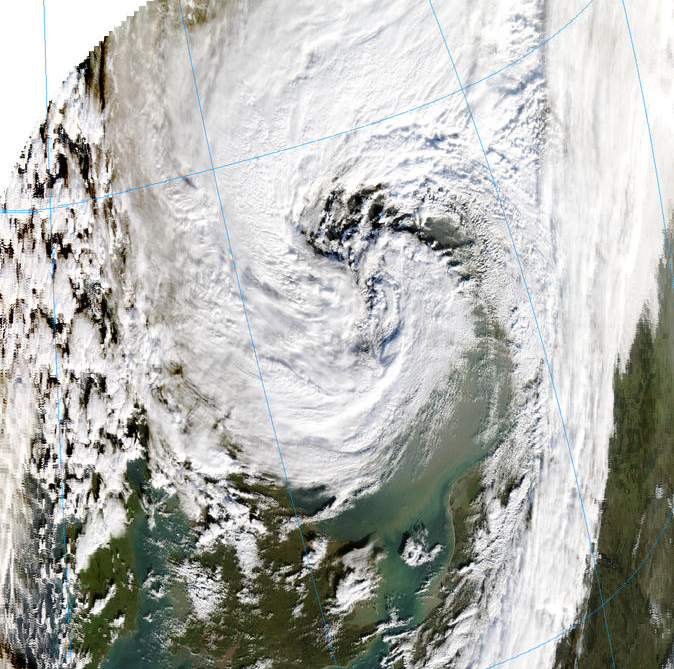
- Cyclone Gudrun in the North Sea

Meteorological history
- Formed: 7 January 2005
- Dissipated: 12 January 2005

Extratropical cyclone
- Lowest pressure: 960 hPa (mbar); 28.35 inHg

Overall effects
- Fatalities: 12 (7 in Sweden, 4 in Denmark,1 in Estonia)
- Damage: £1.1 billion (2005 GBP)
- Areas affected: United Kingdom, Ireland, Norway, Denmark, Sweden, Latvia, Estonia

Gudrun was a powerful storm which hit Denmark and Sweden on 8 January 2005, and Latvia and Estonia on 9 January 2005. The name Erwin was chosen by the Free University of Berlin, while the storm was named Gudrun by the Norwegian Meteorological Institute and was the name used in Sweden. Sustained wind speeds of 126 km/h (78 mph) with wind gusts of 165 km/h (103 mph) were measured in Hanstholm, Denmark – the same strength as a Category 1 hurricane.

The storm caused significant financial damage in Sweden, where the forest industry suffered greatly from damaged trees, as more than 75 million cubic metres (2.6×10^{9} cu ft) of trees were blown down in southern Sweden. This resulted in Sweden at the time having the world's largest surplus of lumber.

About 415,000 homes lost power in Sweden and several thousand of these were without power for many days and even weeks in some cases, as about 10,000 homes were still without power after three weeks. The death toll in Sweden was nine victims, eleven in the clearing work, making it one of the biggest environmental disasters in Swedish history, while four were killed in Denmark and one in Estonia.

== Meteorological history ==
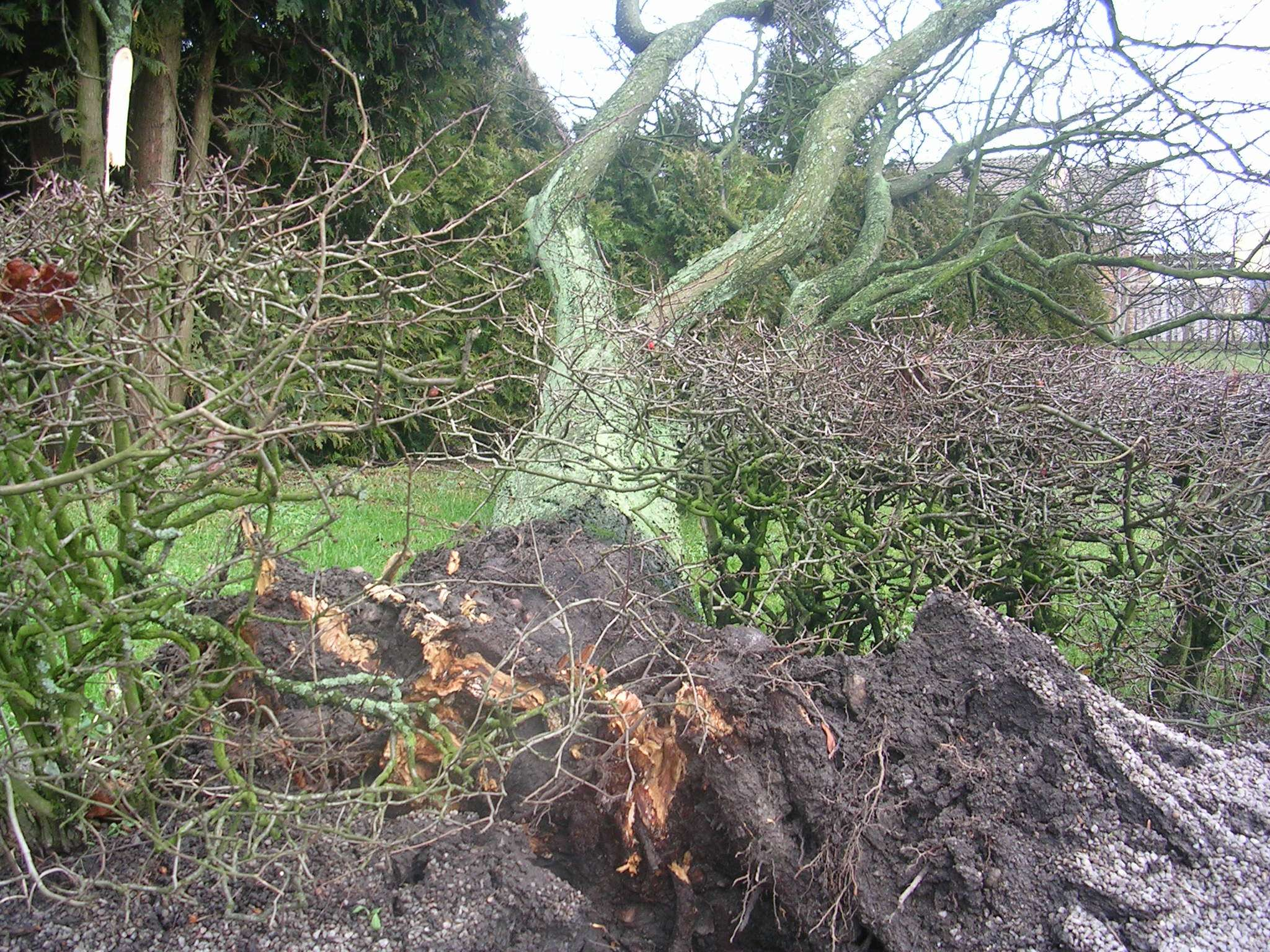
Fallen tree by Onslunda Church in Sweden

On 6 January 2005, a low pressure system developed at a frontal zone south of Newfoundland. It moved into the central North Atlantic and was named 'Erwin' by the Free University of Berlin. Erwin strengthened rapidly and its pressure at the time of naming was 970 mb (29 inHg). Erwin moved quickly, and was already moving over Scotland and Northern Ireland on the 8th. In the UK, temperatures were noticeably higher after the passing of Erwin. On the 9th, Erwin had already moved into the Baltic Sea with a minimum central pressure of 960 mb (28 inHg). Over much of Central and Western Europe, temperatures were very mild. The next day, weakening Erwin was over Western Russia with a pressure of 975 mb (28.8 inHg). Erwin began slowing down as it moved into Central Russia. On 13 January, Erwin dissipated over Russia.

== Impact ==
=== Carlisle and Cumbria flooding ===
In the UK, the main impacts of the storm were flooding in Cumbria and Carlisle, where 1,800 homes were flooded in the city.

=== Sweden blackout and damage to forests ===
Gudrun is one of the strongest storms to impact Sweden in the last 100 years. It caused much damage to forests in Halland the southwestern part of the South Swedish highlands (Småland). Spruces were particularly hit by Gudrun, while other trees with a more steady root system fared better. Damage was also exacerbated by the practice of clearcutting, leaving many trees exposed. Gudrun also caused blackouts and disabled telecommunications infrastructure.

== Aftermath ==
=== Byholma Wood Stockpile ===
The cyclone created the world's largest wood stockpile, which Gizmodo lists as containing 1 million cubic metres (35,000,000 cu ft) of wood as of May 2012. In Sweden, the total volume of wood from the trees struck down by the storm was about 75 million cubic metres (2.6×10^{9} cu ft).

=== Political impact in Sweden ===
In her dissertation, "Natural Disasters and National Election", Lina M. Eriksson, found that the storm played a crucial role in the historic regime shift in the 2006 Swedish general election. The incumbent Social Democratic Party's poor crisis response to Gudrun, hitherto the most expensive natural disaster in Swedish history, significantly contributed to the incumbent's loss. In a subsequent article in Electoral Studies, it was observed that the deficient storm response still swayed voters in the 2010 and 2014 elections.

== See also ==
- Cyclone Anatol
- Cyclone Per
- European windstorm
- Sting jet
