= Cyclone Per =

2007 European windstorm

Cyclone Per (Hanno)
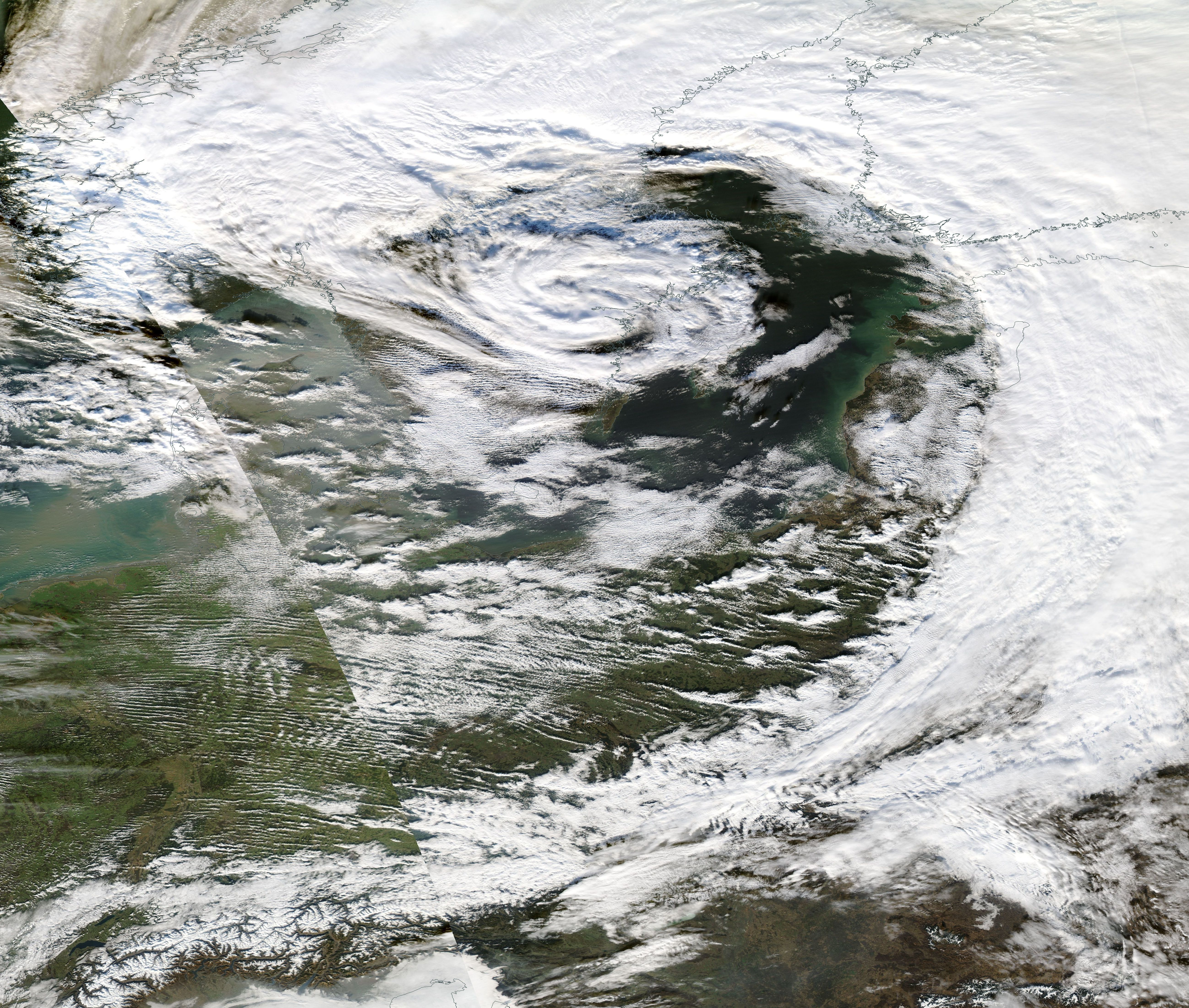
- Per located just onshore Norway on January 14, 2007

Meteorological history
- Formed: 13 January 2007
- Dissipated: 15 January 2007

Extratropical cyclone
- Lowest pressure: 965 hPa (mbar); 28.50 inHg

Overall effects
- Fatalities: 6
- Areas affected: Scandinavia, United Kingdom, Russia

Cyclone Per was a powerful storm with hurricane-force winds which hit the west coast of Sweden and Norway on the morning of 14 January 2007. In Sweden, six people died from the storm and approximately 300,000 households were left without electricity.

The storm was officially named Cyclone Hanno by the Free University of Berlin, which names all low-pressure areas that affect Europe, while the storm was named Per by the Norway Weather Service, which names all strong storms that affect Norway.

== Deaths ==
- A man in his 60s died when his car was hit by a falling tree in Jönköping County on 14 January. A woman who was traveling with him suffered minor injuries.
- A 9-year-old boy in Motala died after a tree fell on him at around midday on 14 January.
- A 24-year-old truck driver was killed in Ullared when his truck was hit by a tree on 14 January.
- A 61-year-old man died in Malmö harbor in an accident due to the storm on 14 January.
- Two men died on 15 January, one on Öland and one in Småland, when working in woods in the aftermath of the storm.

== See also ==
- List of European windstorms
