= Hurricane Stephen =

Atlantic windstorm

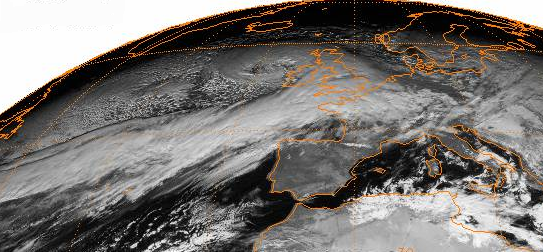
Meteosat 26 December 1998 11:30 UTC

Hurricane Stephen (also called the (Great) Boxing Day Storm of 1998) was an Atlantic windstorm that made landfall in northwest Ireland. It peaked on 26 December 1998 where Saint Stephen's Day is celebrated in Ireland, Isle of Man and Wales with Boxing Day celebrated in England, Scotland and Northern Ireland.

== Storm ==
The storm lasted from 03:00 on 24 December to 15:00 on 29 December 1998, peaking on 26 December. The Met Office reported that mean speeds over land reached nearly 97 km/h (60 mph) over a period of twelve hours, with gusts exceeding 140 km/h (90 mph) and being recorded at over 160 km/h (100 mph) were recorded at some locations.

The storm followed a period of higher than average rainfall, with 400–800 mm (16–31 in) falling in the west of the country and 200–300 mm (7.9–11.8 in) in the east, in the four-month period from September to December. This softened the soil, making trees more vulnerable to wind. The Met Office estimated that a storm on the magnitude of the one in December 1998 occurs around once every four years somewhere in Britain, and once every twenty at any given point, with the wind coming in a belt around 200 km (120 mi) wide.

== Damage ==
Large parts of northern England and Scotland lost access to electricity. 50,000 households were without electricity for more than 24 hours, with some supplies not restored until the New Year. Six electricity companies in Great Britain declared a systems emergency as a result of the damage.

The reactors at Hunterston B nuclear power station were shut down when power was lost, possibly due to arcing at pylons caused by salt spray from the sea. When the grid connection was restored, the generators that had powered the station during the blackout were shut down and left on "manual start", so when the power failed again the station was powered by batteries for a short time of around 30 minutes, until the diesel generators were started manually. During this period the reactors were left without forced cooling, in a similar fashion to the Fukushima Daiichi nuclear disaster, but the event at Hunterston was rated as INES 2.
