= Cyclone Zeus =

2017 European windstorm

- Meteo 8 vapor image of Zeus storm France 6 March 2017

Meteorological history
- Formed: March 6, 2017
- Dissipated: March 6, 2017

European windstorm, Extratropical cyclone, Winter storm
- Highest gusts: 193 km/h (120 mph) Camaret-sur-Mer
- Lowest pressure: 996 mb (29.4 inHg) (or 991.3 hPa Ouessant)

Overall effects
- Fatalities: 2
- Areas affected: France, Switzerland, Italy

Cyclone Zeus was an extratropical cyclone and European windstorm which affected France on 6–7 March 2017. The storm developed rapidly and moved quickly across France on a north-west/south-east trajectory from Finistère in Brittany to the Alpes-Maritimes then Corsica. The storm's rapid strengthening resulted in much stronger winds than initially expected, with a maximum gust of 193 kilometres per hour (120 mph) recorded in Camaret-sur-Mer, Finistère.

Météo-France reported 7% of French territory experienced winds in excess of 120 kilometres per hour (75 mph), Météo-France described it as the tenth most severe storm to impact France between 1980 and 2017. The storm was the costliest storm of the 2016/17 winter across Europe.

== Impact ==
France

In France 2 had been killed and 220,000 homes had been left without power as a result of Cyclone Zeus.

Switzerland

Italy
