= Mace Head Atmospheric Research Station =

Mercury recording station in Carna, Ireland

- Ireland
- Area around the MHARS
- Location of Mace Head Atmospheric Research Station in Ireland
- Coordinates: 53°19′36″N 9°54′17″W
- Country: Ireland
- Region: Carna, County Galway
- Established: 1987
- Status: Operational
- Station Manager: Jurgita Ovadnevaite
- Time zone: UTC+0
- Annual rainfall: 1,200mm
- Average air temperature: 10 degrees Celsius
- Sea temperature: 10 degrees Celsius in winter, 15 degrees Celsius in summer
- Infrastructure and facilities: These include: 10 m (33 ft) meteorological tower; 3 laboratory buildings; Aluminium walk-up towers; Cargo container laboratory

Mace Head Atmospheric Research Station is located on the west coast of Ireland, and is one of the longest running mercury recording stations in the world. The station's location is important as it is far away from neighbouring cities, to minimise the risk of pollutant interference with recordings. Its location is also suitable for studying the atmosphere under Northern Hemispheric and European conditions. The station has the dual status of being a World Meteorological Organization (WMO) Global Atmosphere Watch (GMO) station and a European Monitoring and Evaluation Program (EMEP) supersite. Mace Head research and monitor the climate and atmospheric composition, focusing on aerosol-cloud interactions and mercury readings.

== About ==
Mace Head Atmospheric Research Station was established in 1987, and is still in operation. The station has the dual status of being a World Meteorological Organization (WMO) Global Atmosphere Watch (GMO) station and a European Monitoring and Evaluation Program (EMEP) supersite. It is currently managed by the University of Galway's and operated by the University's Ryan Institute Centre for Climate and Air Pollution studies.

The University of Galway has operated at Mace Head for 50 years, and Mace Head Station is one of the most important Global Atmosphere Watch stations in the Northern Hemisphere. With funding from research projects, it is the University's personnel; the students and post-doctoral fellows who are responsible for the operation and maintenance of equipment at Mace Head station.

== Location ==
The Mace Head Atmospheric Research Station is located in Carna, County Galway, on the west coast of Ireland. This Northern Hemisphere station has westerly exposure to the North Atlantic Ocean, with coordinates of 53.3267ºN, 9.9046ºW. This is a clean sector from 180 degrees to 300 degrees, and approximately 60% of the air that is measured by the site arrives through this clean sector. Time in Ireland is Western European Time (WET, UTC+00) in winter and Western European Summer Time (WEST, UTC+01) in summer (although, at almost 10°W, local solar time is 40 minutes later than civil time). Annual rainfall is 1,200mm, 10 °C average air temperature, and a sea temperature of 10 °C in winter and 15 °C in summer. Peat lands and wetlands surround the station, and its location is approximately 90 metres (300 ft) from the shoreline.

To reduce pollutants influencing and interfering with measurements taken at the site, Mace Head is located approximately 88 kilometres (55 mi) west of Galway city. Similarly, the clean sector surrounding the site also includes three small close surrounding islands, but they are uninhabited and thus do not influence the measurements taken at the site. Furthermore, the main Atlantic shipping routes are over 150 km (93 mi) away, and the transatlantic air corridors are over 80 km (50 mi) away, thus ensuring cleaner readings.

The location of Mace Head makes it a suitable site for measuring marine biogenic gases, aerosol production and chemistry, and long-range transport of air pollution. It is also suitable for studying the atmosphere under Northern Hemispheric conditions as well as European conditions during eastern winds.

There are numerous facilities on the site used for recording and analysing data. These facilities consist of a 10 m (33 ft) tall meteorological tower, an aluminium walk-up tower and a cargo container laboratory, and three laboratory buildings; one that is 300 m (980 ft) from the shore, and two that are 90 m (300 ft) from the shore.

== History ==
Research and operations began during 1978 to 1983 in Adrigole, County Cork. However, this was shut down and the operations officially moved to the Mace Head site in 1987. It was from 1987 that measurements of chloroform, methane and trichlorotrifluoroethane began, and in 1995 carbon monoxide and hydrogen began. In October 1994, the Advanced Global Atmospheric Gases Experiment (AGAGE) network installed their first automated gas chromatography-mass spectrometer. It was later replaced by the Agilent 5973 MS in 1998, and in December 2004 was retired and the Medusa gas chromatography-mass spectrometry system (Medusa-GCMS) was installed.

== Mission statement and research themes ==
The Mace Head station has numerous research aims and themes, such as monitoring climate change, atmospheric composition, aerosol-cloud interactions, air quality, atmosphere-ocean exchange and climate-ecosystem interactions. Their mission statement states that their goal is to monitor trends of atmospheric composition change, monitor climate variables and air pollution, and research atmospheric composition and its impact on climate change. Mace Head also wants to promote education within the topics of climate, air pollution, and the atmosphere.

== Instruments ==
Mace Head uses a variety of instruments to record their findings. Some of these instruments include a ceilometer and doppler lidar, both used to detect clouds and aerosols, a cloud radar, microwave radiometer and a nano-scanning mobility particle sizer. Mace Head also has a gas chromatography–mass spectrometry system (Medusa-GCMS), which was installed in December 2004 and measures trace gas species.

Mace Head also has an automated atomic fluorescence analyzer (AFS) and an automated atomic absorption analyzer (AAS), both used to measure time resolved mercury measurements. There is also a cavity ring-down spectrometer (CRDS) which is used to measure carbon dioxide and methane. There is also a gas chromatorgraph-electron capture detector (GC-ECD) to measure sulphur hexafluoride and nitrous oxide, and a gas chromatophraph-multi detector (GC-MD) to measure carbon monoxide and hydrogen.

== Measurements and Recordings ==
Mace Head is renowned for their atmospheric chemistry research, as they measure numerous meteorological elements such as wind speed and direction, temperature, rainfall, and humidity. They also record and measure greenhouse gases, UV levels, and solar radiation. Mace Head began measuring the ozone since 1988, chloroform, methane and trichloro trifluoroethane in 1897, and carbon monoxide and hydrogen began in 1995.

Mark Lunt measured chlorofluorocarbon (CFC), and Jurgita Ovadnevaite reported on the aerosol-cloud and climate interactions at Mace head, specifically the major advances in sea salt aerosols. Observations of methyl chloroform at Mace Head have also been useful in the understanding of methane removal from the atmosphere, which is caused by trends in atmospheric hydroxyl radical concentrations.

Whilst Mace Head does measure numerous atmospheric compositions, they mainly focuses on the measurements of aerosols and mercury readings, but also observed and measures storms and strong winds.

=== Historical Storms and Wind Speeds ===
Mace Head measures storms and strong winds that pass through specifically during winter; storm season. One such storm measured was Storm Ali, the first storm of the 2018–2019 season. Storm Ali arrived at the northern areas of the British Isles on 19 September, and brought heavy rain and strong winds to Northern Ireland and Western Scotland. The highest recorded gust was at Cairn Gorm with 169 km/h (105 mph), and Mace Head captured one of the highest recordings at 140 km/h (90 mph). Storm Ali impacted and disrupted Ireland, causing power outages, travel disruption, damage to buildings and transport, as well as two deaths.

Storm Callum was the third storm of the 2018–2019 season, impacting the UK during 12 and 13 October. Callum brought windy weather, rainfall, power outages, and since there were high tides the winds caused large waves thus many sea walls fell, resulting in coastal flooding. Mace Head measured wind gusts of 116 km/h (72 mph), with maximum gust speeds reading 138 km/h (86 mph) at Capel Curig.

Additionally, Storm Fionn was also measured at Mace Head. It was named by Met Éireann, and was the seventh storm of the 2018–2019 winter. It arrived in Ireland on 16 January and was observed and measured not only at Mace Head, but also other sites such as Sherkin Island, Valentia Observatory, St Mary's Airport and Aberdaron. The highest recorded gust was measured at Mace Head, with a wind speed of 137 km/h (85 mph). Storm Fionn did not have as significant disruption to Ireland as Storm Ali created, with the only impacts being traffic disruption and snowfall.

Other storms measured at Mace Head include Storm Erik in 2019 at 120 km/h (75 mph) and Storm Jake in 2016 at 134 km/h (83 mph).

On 24 January 2025 during Storm Éowyn, Mace Head recorded the strongest ever gust of wind in Ireland at 183 km/h (114 mph), breaking the previous record set during Hurricane Debbie in 1961.

=== Aerosols ===
Air quality modelling is used to highlight the relationship between atmospheric concentrations, emissions, meteorology and other factors. These atmospheric measurements are useful in detailing trace gas concentrations and various atmospheric aerosols.

Aerosols are liquid particles suspended in the air, and they influence the climate by scattering light and affecting clouds, thus they work in opposition to greenhouse gases and cause cooling. Natural aerosols include sulfates, ammonium salts and sea salts. Mace Head has one of the most advanced aerosol monitoring sites in Europe, providing important and vital ash data during the Icelandic volcano eruption during April and May. On 14 April 2010, Iceland's Eyjafjallajökull volcano erupted, with volcanic ash rising up to 9 km (5.6 mi) into the air. The weather conditions worsened for central Europe, with pollutants remaining for the next six days. The vertical volcanic ash plume had a peak of 3.5 km (2.2 mi) and was intercepted by Mace Head 33 times over a six week period, with approximately three of these events lasting more than 12 hours, thus displaying it to be a major ash plume.

Mace Head uses a doppler cloud lidar and a ceilometer to detect clouds and aerosols about 15 m (49 ft) above ground level. This detection and sampling of aerosols is based on wind speed, wind direction, relative humidity and rain presence. For ideal collection of samples, there should be a low wind speed, <95% humidity and no rain present. Furthermore, more dependable samples are taken over multiple days.

There are five main parameters that are routinely measured at Global Atmosphere Watch stations. These are aerosol optical depth, absorption, scattering, mass, and chemistry. Mass and chemistry of aerosols have not yet been measured at Mace Head but will be recorded over the coming years.

The cloud radar can also be used to detect non-spherical and depolarizing volcanic ash particles. Thus, Mace Head is perfect for detecting volcanic aerosol plumes which could be used to alert locations with volcanoes nearby, namely Ireland and Europe, about possible eruptions.

=== Mercury ===
The Mace Head station has been recording mercury (Hg) since 1995, and has thus been one of the longest running mercury recording stations in the world. Mercury data recording and collection is vital as it is a global environmental pollutant emitted both naturally and from man-made sources.

Evidence suggests that mercury emissions from man-made sources are as great as those originating from natural sources, thus it is the man-made emitted mercury that is contributing to an increase in environmental exposure to mercury.

Long term and continuous measurements are necessary as it details whether a fluctuation is normal or something unusual, thus allowing one to monitor background levels of total gaseous mercury. Continuous measurements of mercury are taken within a 15 minute time resolution, and is one of the first stations to generate total gaseous measurements with such a high time resolution. Furthermore, long term monitoring can provide direct evidence of temporal trends, as mercury has an atmospheric residence time of approximately 1 year. Measurements recorded at Mace Head display that background levels of mercury in the Northern Hemisphere are approximately 1.7 ng/m^{3} with a seasonal variation of approximately 20%.

== Other international research networks ==
Mace Head is one of many international research networks, including the Atmospheric/Ocean Chemistry Experiment (AEROCE), the Advanced Global Atmospheric Gases Experiment (AGAGE), the World Meteorological Organization/Global Atmosphere Watch (WMO/GAW), the Budget of Ozone over the Atlantic (BOA), the Tropospheric Ozone Research (TOR, a EUROTRAC project), and the former Climate Monitoring and Diagnostics Laboratory/National Oceanic and Atmospheric Administration (CMDL/NOAA), which became part of Earth System Research Laboratories in 2005.

There are five European Monitoring and Evaluation Programme (EMEP) monitoring stations in Ireland, with Mace Head being the site situated in West Ireland. The remaining four sites are Malin Head (Glenveagh) in the north, Valentia Observatory in the south, Carnsore Point and Johnstown Castle in the east and Oak Park, County Carlow located inland. Each of these EMEP sites have their chemical analysis undertaken by Met Éireann at their Dublin laboratory in Glasnevin.
