= MCIB =

MCIB may refer to:

- Marine Casualty Investigation Board, Irish government agency
- Master Combat Infantryman Badge, U.S. Army award
