= Carna, County Galway =

Area in Connemara, County Galway, Ireland

Coordinates: 53°20′N 9°50′W

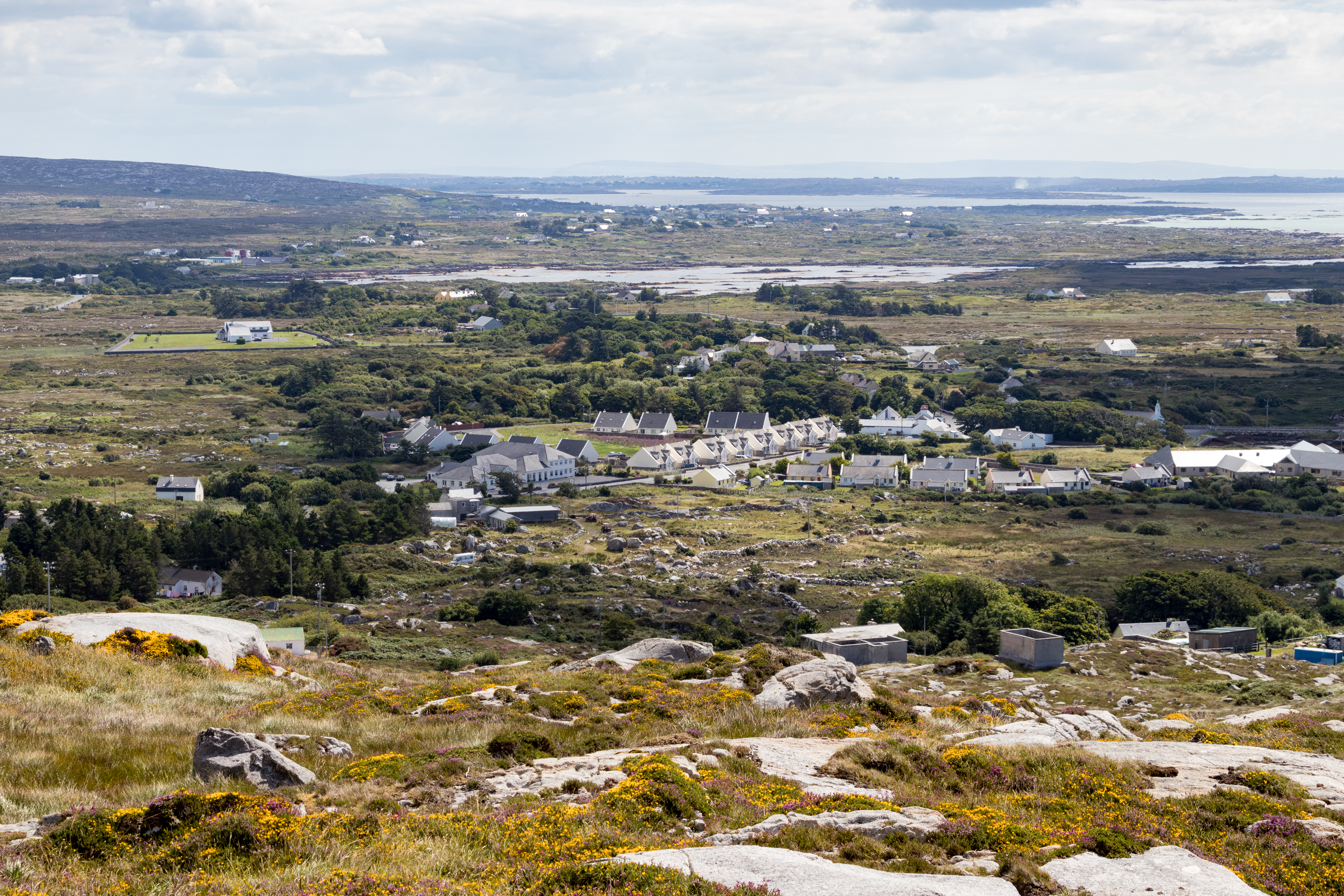
Carna Village

Carna is an area in Connemara, County Galway, Ireland. It is located on the country's west coast in the Gaeltacht, about 74 km west of Galway city. Carna is an extremely small area, but as a focal point for the surrounding areas, it contains a Garda Síochána station, a Health Centre including a Rapid Response Ambulance a football pitch and an Irish Coastguard lifeboat. Carna is not located close to any villages. The population dramatically dropped from the previous average of 8,000 before the Great Famine. The age of the average resident is significantly higher than the Irish national average.

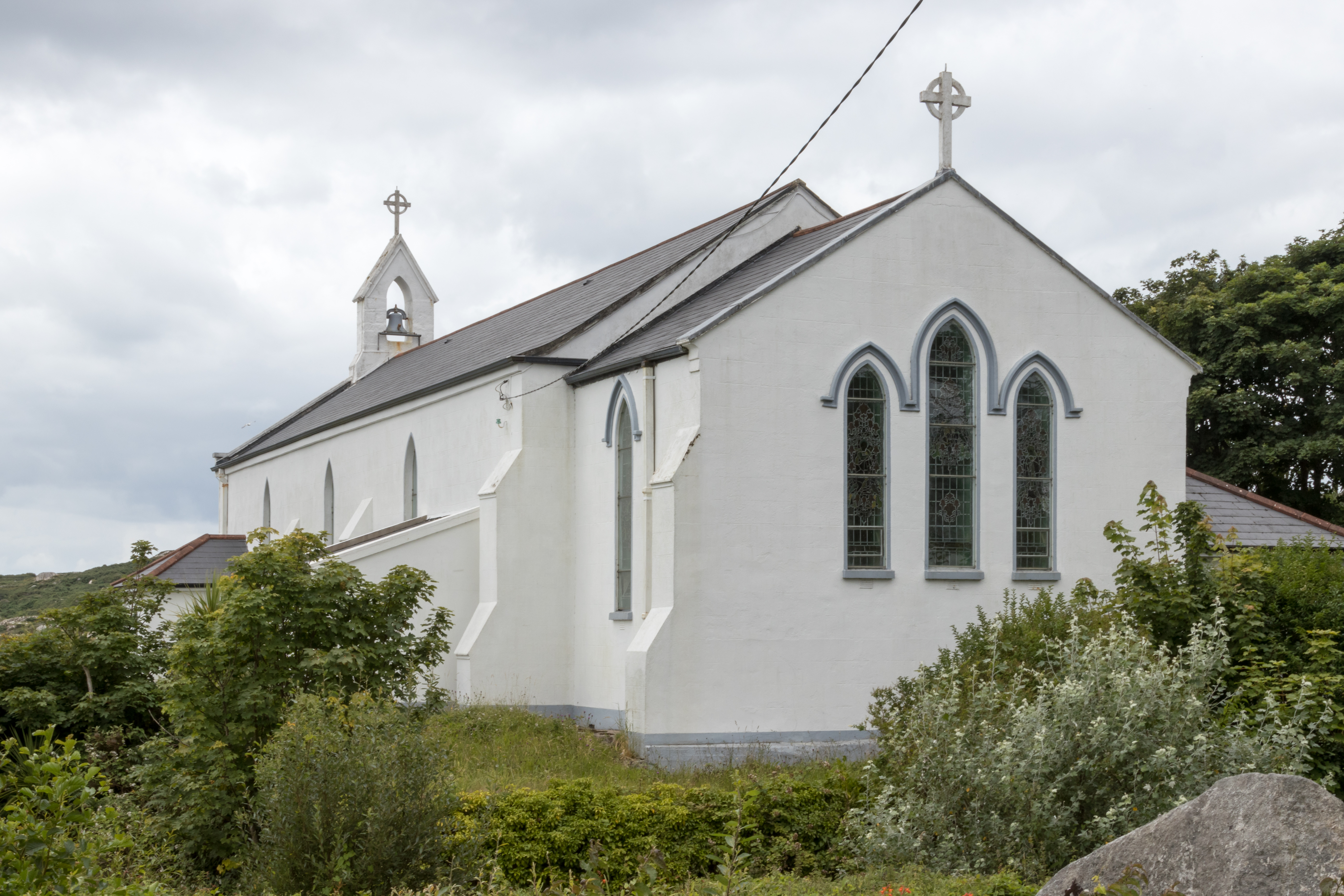
Church in Carna

The National University of Ireland, Galway, has an Irish-language and educational centre (Áras Shorcha Ní Ghuairim) in Roisín na Mainiach, near Carna. It also operates a marine biology station, the Martin Ryan Institute, in Maínis and an atmospheric research station at Mace Head, Carna, run by the university's experimental physics department.

There is a water reservoir in Carna that provides west Connemara, including Roundstone, with fresh water. A bus is based in Carna that brings passengers between Carna and Galway City picking up passengers along the N59.

Following the Cromwellian War and the subsequent Down Survey based confiscations, many of the dispossessed settled in Connacht. The statement "to hell or to Connacht" originated in this migration. Carna is in a strong Gaeltacht region, so most of the people speak Irish at home. The population is almost totally (96% in 2006) bilingual with English being the second language spoken.

During the aftermath of the Irish War of Independence and the Civil War, Carna was a major center for the work of the Irish Folklore Commission in recording Ireland's endangered folklore, mythology, and oral literature. According to folklore collector and archivist Seán Ó Súilleabháin, Carna residents with no stories to tell were the exception rather than the rule and it was generally conceded in 1935 that there were more unrecorded folktales in the parish of Carna alone than anywhere else in Western Europe.

There is an Irish language college for second-level students in Carna and Cill Chiaráin called Coláiste Sheosaimh.

== History ==
=== Early Christianity ===
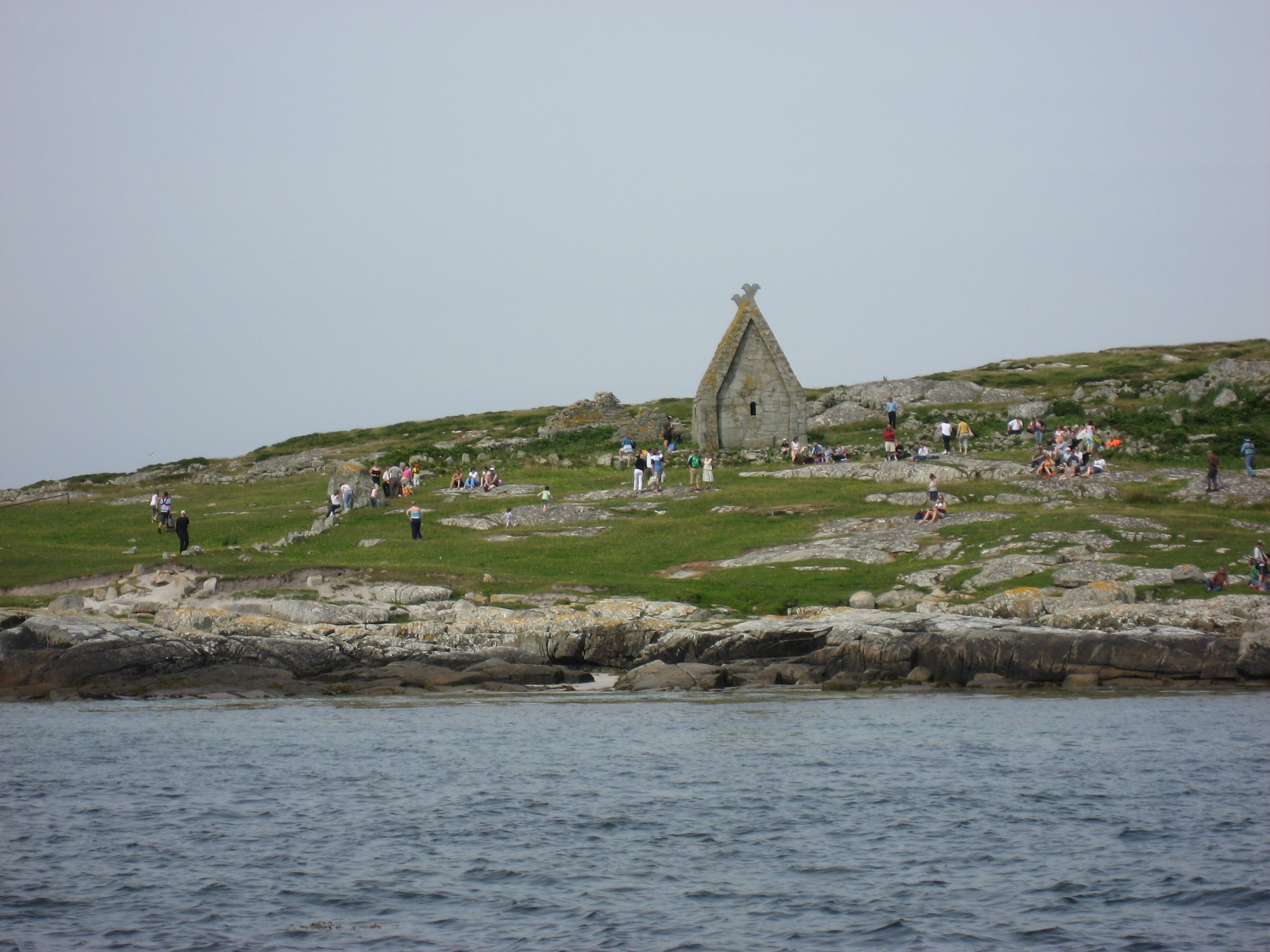
Pilgrimage on MacDara's Island

Saint Macdara's Island (Cruach na Cara) is off the coast of Mace Head near Carna. This is the site of a stone-built early Christian church and the cross of Saint Mac Dara, who is the patron saint of fishermen and sailors in the area. There is a pilgrimage to the Island once a year on 16 July followed by a race of traditional boats.

=== Coastal defence ===
During the scatter of the Spanish Armada's around Britain and the west coast of Ireland, a Spanish ship, the Concepción de Juanes del Cano, went onto rocks off the Carna coast in Mace. The sailors were brought to Galway and were publicly hung in Eyre Square by Governor Bingham of Connaught. No remaining wreckage has been recorded.

There are also the remains of the Martello Tower built during the Napoleonic Wars. These towers were erected to spot French ships off the coast. The tower on Coilín hill, a 5-minute drive from central Carnais, is now in ruins. The remains of what archaeologists think is a cellar can be seen as a hole extends downwards inside the ruins. Also out on Mace Headland 10 minutes from Carna, close to where the Spanish Armada ship went aground, there are the remains of an army bunker used by the Irish Defence Forces during The Emergency (WWII) to spot ships off the Irish coast.

=== St. Oliver wreck ===
In September 2004 the St. Oliver, a fishing vessel, set sail for Ros an Mhíl. The ship was being repaired at the local shipyard in Letterard. On board were four men from various parts of Connemara and the Aran Islands including the owner of the shipyard. The route was to be routine but shortly after leaving the bay it began having difficulties and ran aground on Duck Island, a rock close to Mynish Island. The Irish Coastguard and the Irish Navy were immediately notified, and the shipwreck was found shortly after 11.00 p.m. that night. Throughout the following days, the bodies of the men were recovered from the waters and coasts. Two years previous, a Spanish fishing vessel named the 'Arosa' sank, killing 12 people after running aground 2 miles from Duck Island at Sceirde Rocks. Following a report from the Marine Casualty Investigation Board it was concluded that it wasn't known what had caused the ship to run aground due to the damage to the ships systems caused by the ferocity of the collision and removal of vital equipment during the investigation.

=== Drowning during War of Independence ===
On 6 February 1921, during the Irish War of Independence, four volunteers of the IRA were making their way by boat from Carna (or, more precisely, Moyrus beach in Dooyeher) to Roundstone for a Battalion meeting, when they were caught by a violent storm and drowned off the shore of Inishlackan. Close to the harbour mole of Moyrus beach, a memorial stone has been placed.

== Sport ==
Carna's main sport is Gaelic football. The local team is shared with the neighbouring village of Cashel giving it the name Carna-Cashel or Cárna-Caiseal. The team are currently playing in the Senior League of Galway GAA. The home ground of Carna-Cashel is nicknamed The Plantation but is also known as Páirc Naomh MhicDara. Carna Cashel have had a number of players who have represented the Galway senior football team. In the 1930s Hugo Carey was playing for Carna and won an All-Ireland medal with Galway, Michael Cloherty was also with Galway in 1998 when they ended the 32-year wait for an All Ireland title. More recently players such as Val Feeney and Niall Coyne have represented Galway. From 2016 onwards, Carna will have a ladies' Gaelic football team.

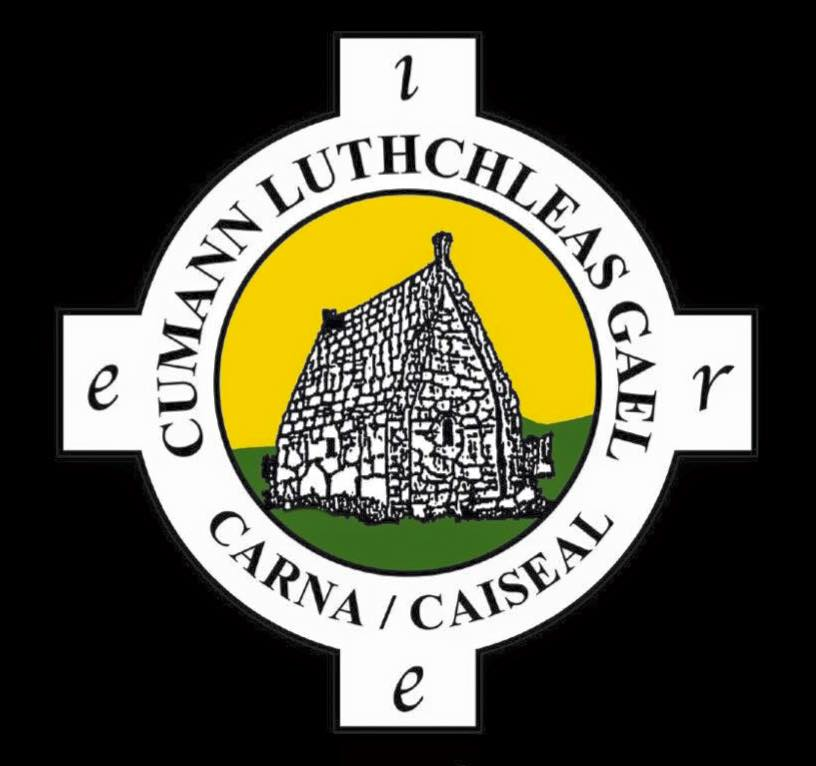
Carna-Cashel crest

Carna is also home to Club Luthchleasaíocht Iorras Aithneach or Iorras Aithneach Athletics Club. The club was formed in 2015. It was helped by the opening of an astro turf ground in Cill Chiaráin. Members of the club have taken part in events in Galway and at the Regionals in Athlone.

== Townlands ==
While Carna is the main area of Iorras Aithneach there are a number of areas which can be described as "townlands" attributed to Carna. Beginning in the west and moving along the coast there are: Glynsk, Letterard, Muighros, Coilín, Ard West, and east: Más, Leathmhás, Leitir Deisceart, Crumpán, Cárna, Ruisin na Mainioch, Feenish and Callowfeenish. The island of Muighinis can also be included and this adds the townlands of Ros Dugán, Feithearnach and Ruisín a'Chaladh.

== Notable people ==
- Éamon a Búrc, a storyteller in the Irish language, was longtime resident of Carna. The volumes of his transcribed tales remain in the possession of the Irish Folklore Commission. He is widely considered one of the most talented Irish traditional storytellers ever recorded. Furthermore, according to Irish-American historian Bridget Connelly, the stories collected by the Irish Folklore Commission from Éamon a Búrc are still taught in University courses alongside Beowulf, the Elder Edda, and the Homeric Hymns.
- Nan Tom Teaimín de Búrca lives in Rusheenamanagh
- Joe Heaney (1919–1984), was a sean-nós singer from Carna, is said to have known more than 500 songs – most learned while he was growing up in Carna. The Féile Chomórtha Joe Éinniú (Joe Heaney Commemorative Festival) is held every year in Carna.
- Máire Geoghegan-Quinn, born in Carna, former European Commissioner for Research, Innovation and Science.
- Denis McDonough, Chief of Staff for the United States National Security Council. His grandfather came from Ard West in Carna before his family moved to Minnesota where Denis grew up.
- Liam Cosgrave, the former Taoiseach, lived in Carna for a number of years to learn Irish in the old national school in Carna.
- James Berry, writer of Mayo News column Tales of the West – Recollections of my Early Boyhood. Berry died in 1914 and was buried in Mynish cemetery, Carna.
- Marty Walsh, the 54th Mayor of Boston, has close connections to both Carna and Rosmuc.
