= Letterard =

Townland in County Galway, Ireland

Coordinates: 53.3286°N 9.8419°W

Letterard (Irish: Leitreach Árd) is a townland located in the parish of Moyrus or Carna, Connemara on the West Coast of the Republic of Ireland.

It is located in County Galway. To the west of Letterard is Bertrabhoy Bay. Across the bay from Letterard is Roundstone. The word Letterard itself means high area which is noteworthy as the townland is located on an elevated area on the peninsula. Bordering the Bay area is a cliff on called Áill Dá Bhinn. This translates to the cliff with the two peaks.

During the feudal ages a demesne lodge was located in Letterard. This belonged to a tenant in demesne who came under the landlord located in Knockboy House just outside Carna village. The ruins of the lodge are still to be found in the Eastern half of Letterard.

== Population ==
Letterard has an overall population of 103. It is also located in the Connemara Gaeltacht. Before the Great Famine struck Ireland the population of Letterard was around 800 people and it dramatically dropped to just over 100 by the end of the famine.

Peninsula located to the South West of Letterard

- Crumpán: A small hilly area to the South East
- Béal Carra: A small peninsula to the West of Letterard, with a pier

== Drowning during War of Independence ==
On 6 February 1921, during the Irish War of Independence, four volunteers of the Old IRA were making their way by boat from Letterard, Carna to Roundstone for a Battalion meeting, when they were caught by a violent storm and drowned of the shore of Inishlaken Island. A memorial stone has been placed near the mole of Letterad's Moyrus beach.

== Famous residents ==
- Johnny Mháirtín Learaí MacDonnacha: Famous sean-nós singer, known in Scotland.
- Senator Margaret Craven: born in Letterard and moved to America when she was still a teenager. She was elected a senator in Maine in 2009. She returned to Letterard in 2010 to her nearest relation Eileen Connelly, the wife of Margaret's brother Josie who died in the boating tragedy off the Carna coast.
