= Saint Macdara's Island =

Island in County Galway, Ireland

- Cruach na Cara
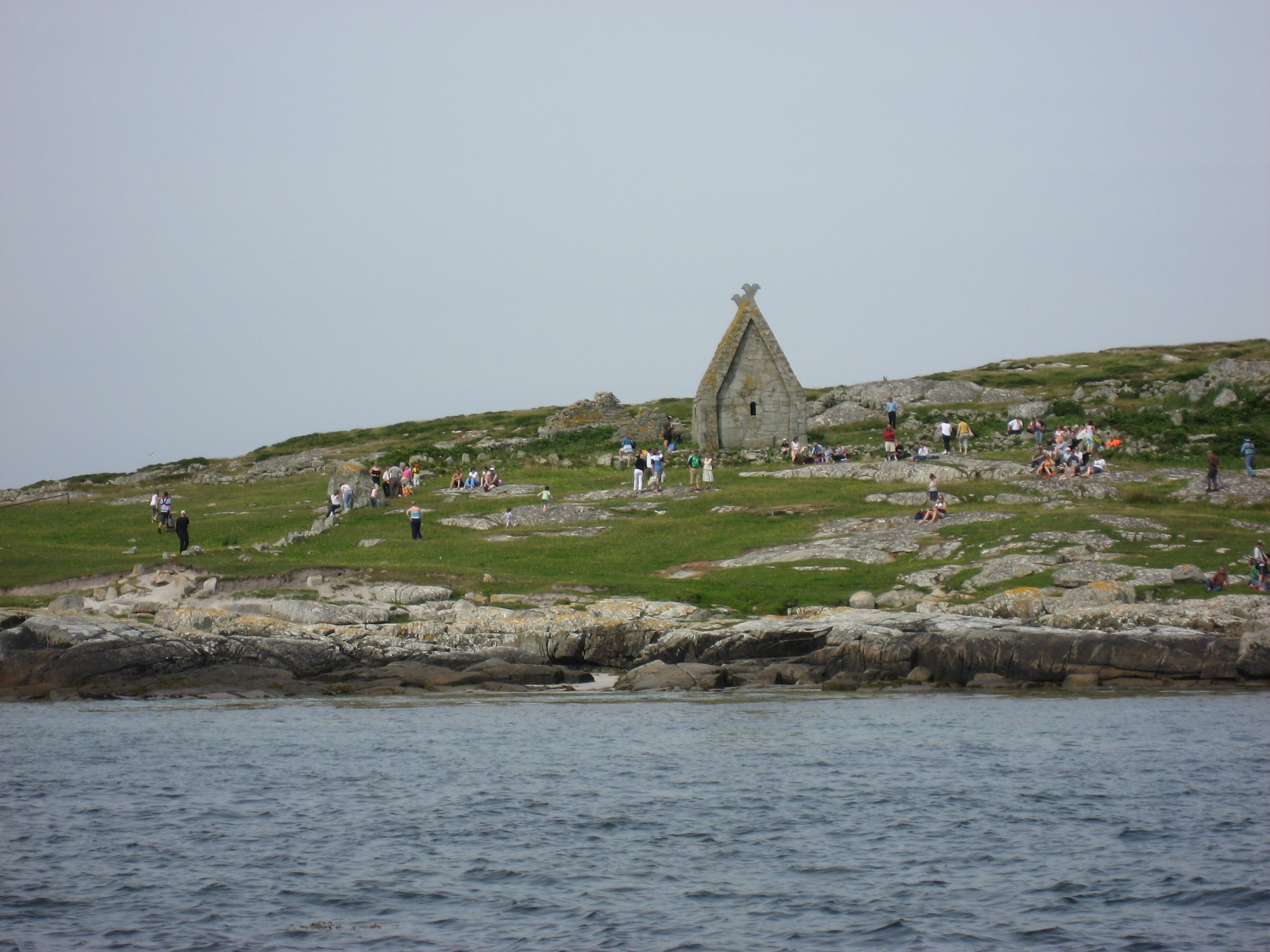
- Annual pilgrimage at tenth century church on Macdara's Island

- Location within Ireland
- Interactive map of Saint Macdara's Island

Monastery information
- Established: 6th century AD
- Disestablished: Before 1100
- Diocese: Tuam

People
- Founder: Macdara

Architecture
- Status: Ruined
- Style: Celtic

Site
- Location: Carna, County Galway, Ireland
- Coordinates: 53.304424°N 9.917318°W
- Public access: Yes

Saint Macdara's Island (Irish: Cruach na Cara) is a small island off the coast of County Galway in Ireland on which stands a mediaeval Christian monastery and National Monument.

== Location ==
The island is located on a 60-acre (24.5 ha) granite mountain island off the coast of Connemara, 6 km (3.7 mi) west-southwest of Carna.

== History ==
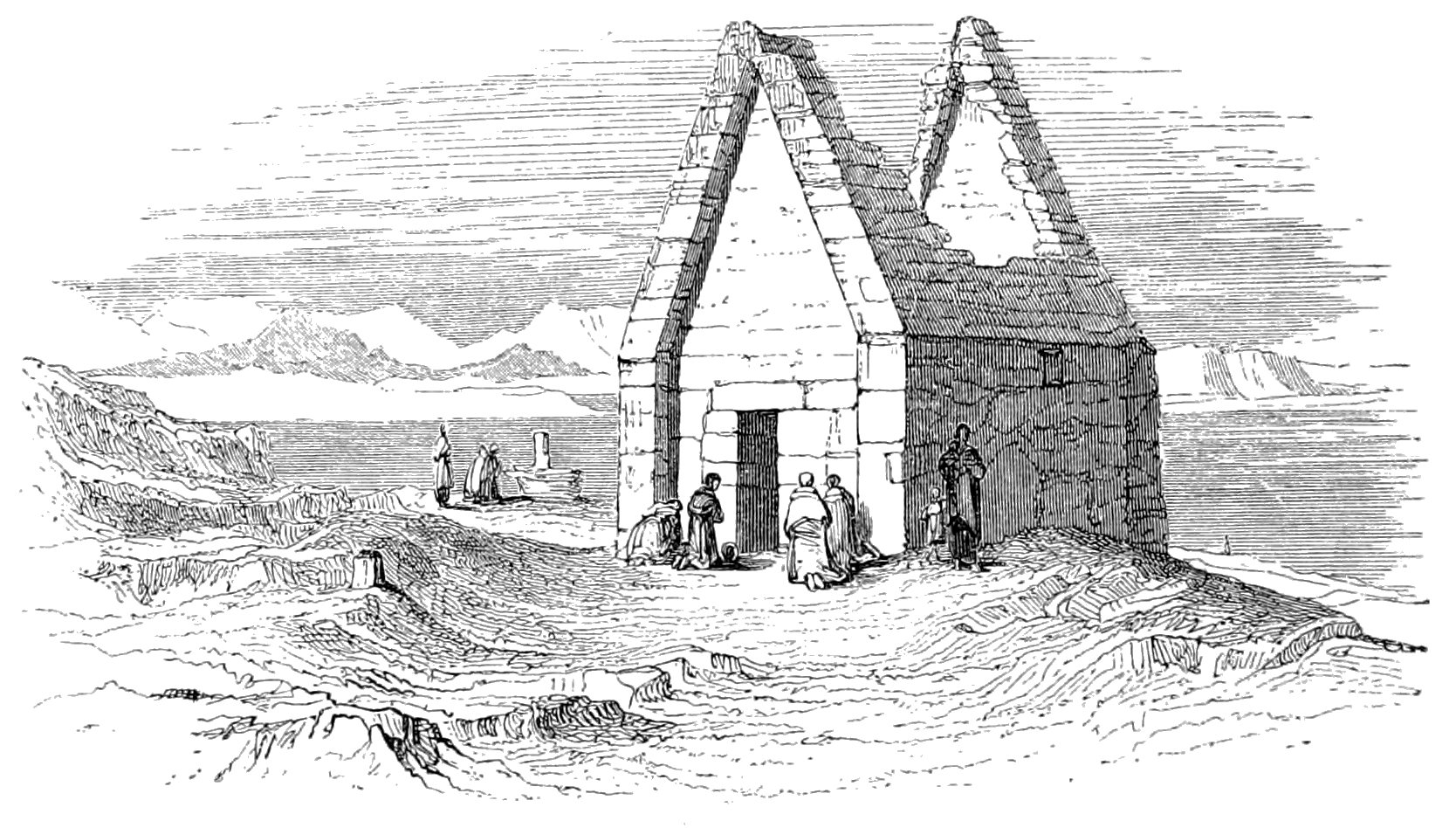
19th century illustration, prior to the roof restoration of 1977

Saint Sinach Macdara, patron saint of seafarers, is believed to have built a wooden church on the island in the sixth century. It was replaced by the present stone building in the 10th century. The roof stones were cut to mimic wood shingles.

Local fishermen traditionally dipped their sails three times while passing the island.

A wooden statue of the saint was paid special reverence by locals; in an act of iconoclasm the Archbishop of Tuam ordered it buried.

Every 16 July on Féile Mhic Dara (Feast of Macdara) local people make a pilgrimage to the island for a mass and blessing of boats (including the famous Galway hookers).

There is no pier on the island. Nine people drowned on a pilgrimage to the island during a storm in 1907. The roof on the island's church was restored in 1977. In addition to the church, there are three penitential stations consisting of cross slabs, and a holy well. There are also the ruins of a much later bothy around which animals were once raised.

== Description ==
A stone church or oratory, probably a shrine for Macdara's remains. There are several cross slabs and an enclosure.

== Postage stamps ==
The Irish postal service, An Post, released a series of definitive stamps between 1982 and 1986 depicting the tenth century Macdara's Church on the island. The five stamps were as follows:

Year	Colour	Value (pence)
1982	Green	29p
1983	Black	30p
1985	Ruby	28p
1985	Blue	37p
1986	Brown	32p
