= Scottish Government Resilience Room =

Emergency and crisis response co–ordination facility

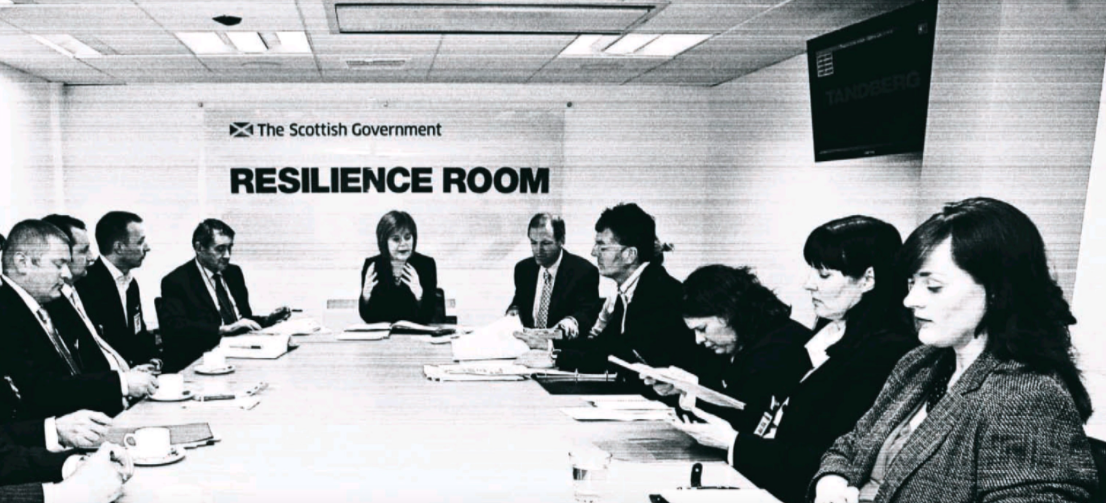
- Nicola Sturgeon chairs a meeting in the resilience room in response to the 2009 swine flu pandemic
- Building: St Andrew's House, Regent Road
- Location: Edinburgh
- Country: Scotland
- Purpose: Conference room and crisis management centre

The Scottish Government Resilience Room (SGoRR) is the emergency and crisis response co–ordination facility of the Scottish Government, activated in cases of national emergency or crisis, or during events abroad with major implications for Scotland. It is located in Edinburgh, Scotland's capital city, at St Andrew's House, the official headquarters of the Scottish Government. Prior to February 2008, it was called the Scottish Government Emergency Room, or "SEER", from the former name "Scottish Executive Emergency Room".

When the extent or complexity of an emergency requires a greater degree of central government co-ordination, the Scottish Government will formally launch and activate its emergency response arrangements through the Scottish Government Resilience Room. The precise role of the facility will alter depending on the precise nature and matter of the emergency.

== Operations and purpose ==
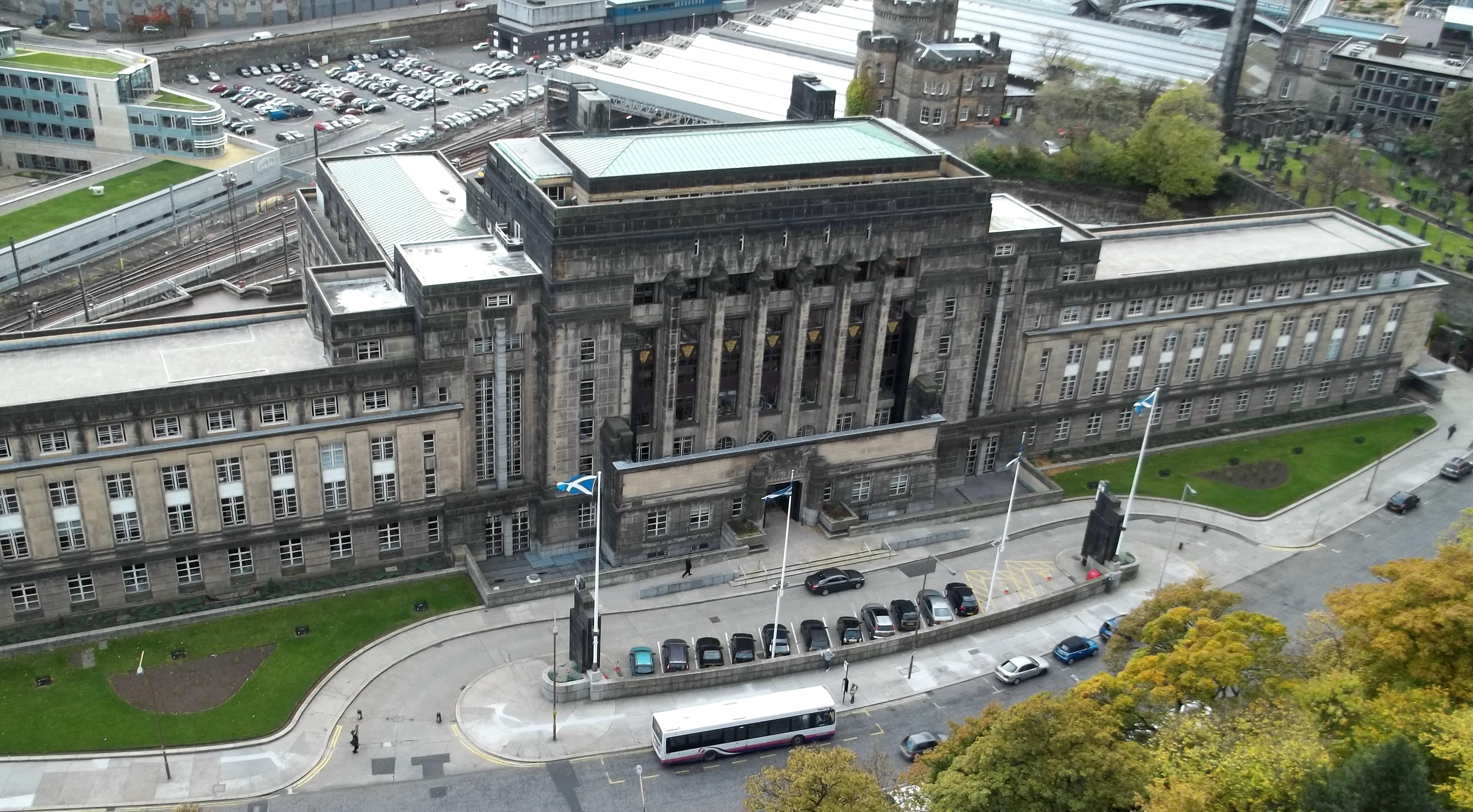
The SGoRR is primarily located at St. Andrew's House, Edinburgh

The main location for the operations centre in located within the Scottish Government headquarters in St. Andrew's House in Edinburgh, with contingency arrangements in place to use other Scottish Government locations at Saughton House, Edinburgh and Atlantic Quay 5, Glasgow.

The operations of the Scottish Government Resilience Room is in part organised and run by Ready Scotland, an agency of the Scottish Government (Safer Scotland division).

A meeting in SEER was held on the 1 July 2007 due to the terrorist attack on Glasgow Airport. Since then, meetings have been held in the resilience room in response to significant events such as the 2009 swine flu pandemic and the COVID-19 pandemic in Scotland.

When activated by the Scottish Government, the Scottish Government Resilience Room facility will acts as a means of ensuring that strategic direction and response to emergencies and acts of crisis in Scotland is provided and the co–ordination of support from Scottish Government agencies in activated. It will ensure that the Scottish ministers are kept updated regarding the situation by collating and maintaining a strategic overview of the emergency response, particularly focused on response and recovery issues. The Resilience Room has facilities available to allow for Scottish Government ministers to the briefed as and when necessary on any issue. This may include the collaboration between the Scottish and UK Governments, as well as collaboration and liaison between the Scottish Government and local government.

The room supports the response and recovery efforts including the allocation of "scarce Scottish resources" and circulate national advice and information for the public, through means such as media channels. Ultimately, when in activation, the Scottish Government Resilience Room will determine the Scottish Government's strategy for public communication and will begin to co-ordinate public messages nationally, in consultation with the Resilience Partnerships and other key stakeholders who may be involved in the emergency response.

== Notable times of operation ==
The Scottish Government Resilience Room has been activated on several occasions to either coordinate the Scottish Government's response or preparation ahead of or following significant national events, crisis or terrorism attacks. Notable instances where the resilience room has been activated included:

- 2007 Glasgow Airport attack
- COVID-19 pandemic in Scotland
- Storm Éowyn
- December 2024 high winds and heavy rainfall
- 2024 CrowdStrike-related IT outages
- 2025 Wildfires across Scotland
- 2025 Storm Amy

== Membership ==
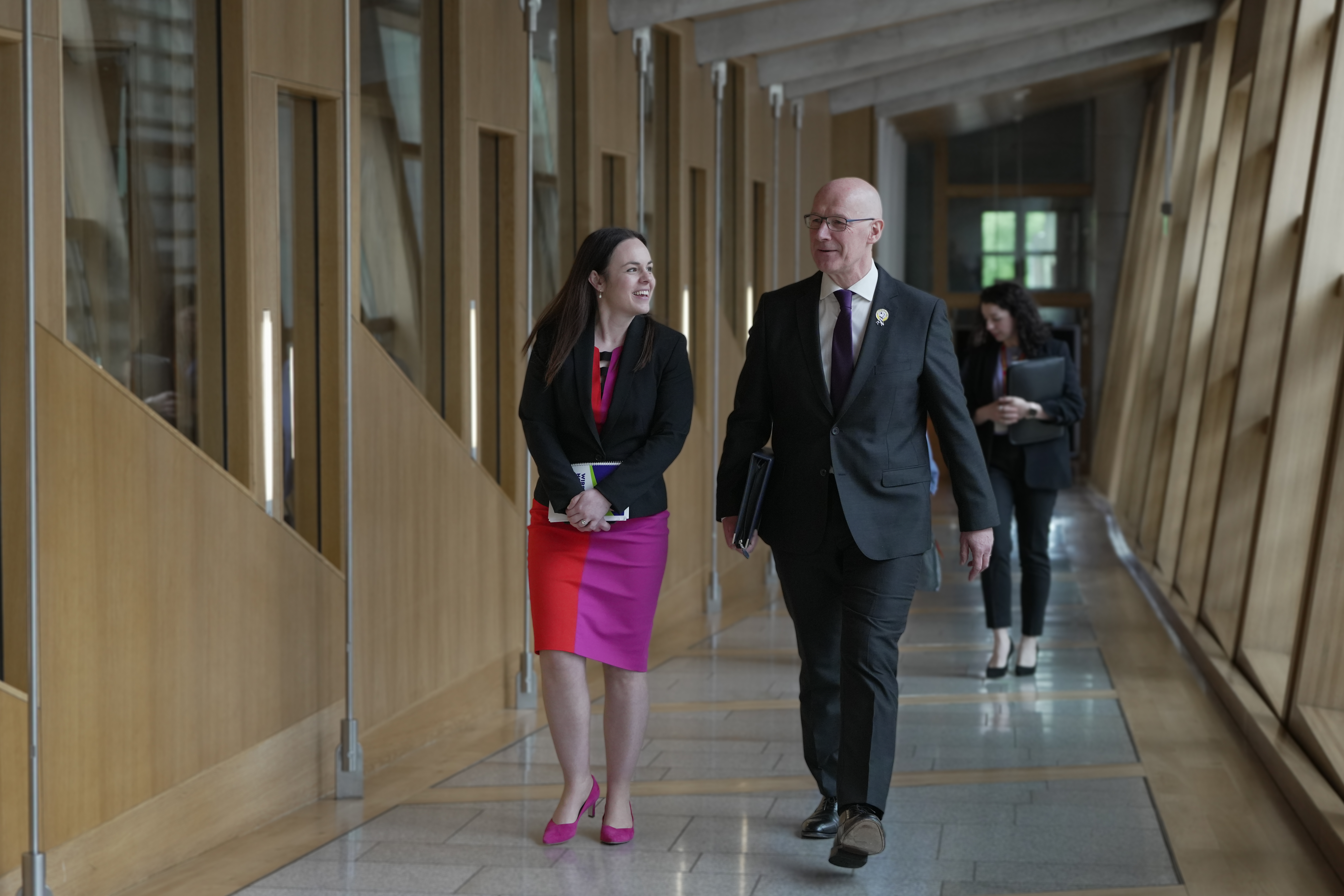
The SGoRR is often chaired by the First Minister or the Deputy First Minister

The Scottish Government Resilience Room is run by a sub-committee of the Cabinet. There is no official membership of SGoRR, however, those who regularly attend are as follows:

=== Head of government ===
- First Minister of Scotland – (John Swinney; May 2024–present)
- Deputy First Minister of Scotland – (Jenny Gilruth; May 2026–present)

=== Cabinet secretaries ===
- Cabinet Secretary for Justice and Home Affairs
- Cabinet Secretary for Finance and the Economy
- Cabinet Secretary for Health and Social Care
- Cabinet Secretary for Rural Affairs and Islands

=== Law officers ===
- Lord Advocate
  (Ruth Charteris; June 2026–present)

== Meetings ==
The meeting room has accommodation to sit up to 40 attendees, however, during the COVID-19 pandemic in Scotland, this was reduced to 17 in order to abide by Scottish Government laws and restrictions. A Freedom of Information (FOI) request confirmed that prior to the outbreak of COVID-19 in Scotland, the SCoRR was activated three times in order to prepare Scotland for the outbreak, with two of those being chaired by the First Minister. A representative from Police Scotland also attended those SCoRR meetings. During COVID-19 related SCoRR meetings, officials such as the Chief Medical Officer of Scotland and the National Clinical Director of the Scottish Government, also attended.

Other meetings of the SGoRR, such as meetings relating to Winter Preparedness, Concurrent Risk in Ukraine and the RMT Rail Strike, have been chaired by the Director of Performance, Delivery and Resilience. During a meeting of the SGoRR regarding readiness for Winter on 2 November 2022, attendees included the Cabinet Secretary for Net Zero, Energy and Transport, Cabinet Secretary for Social Justice, Housing and Local Government and the Minister for Children and Young People. Others from agencies such as the Met Office and Transport Scotland were also involved.
