= Macdara =

6th-century Irish saint

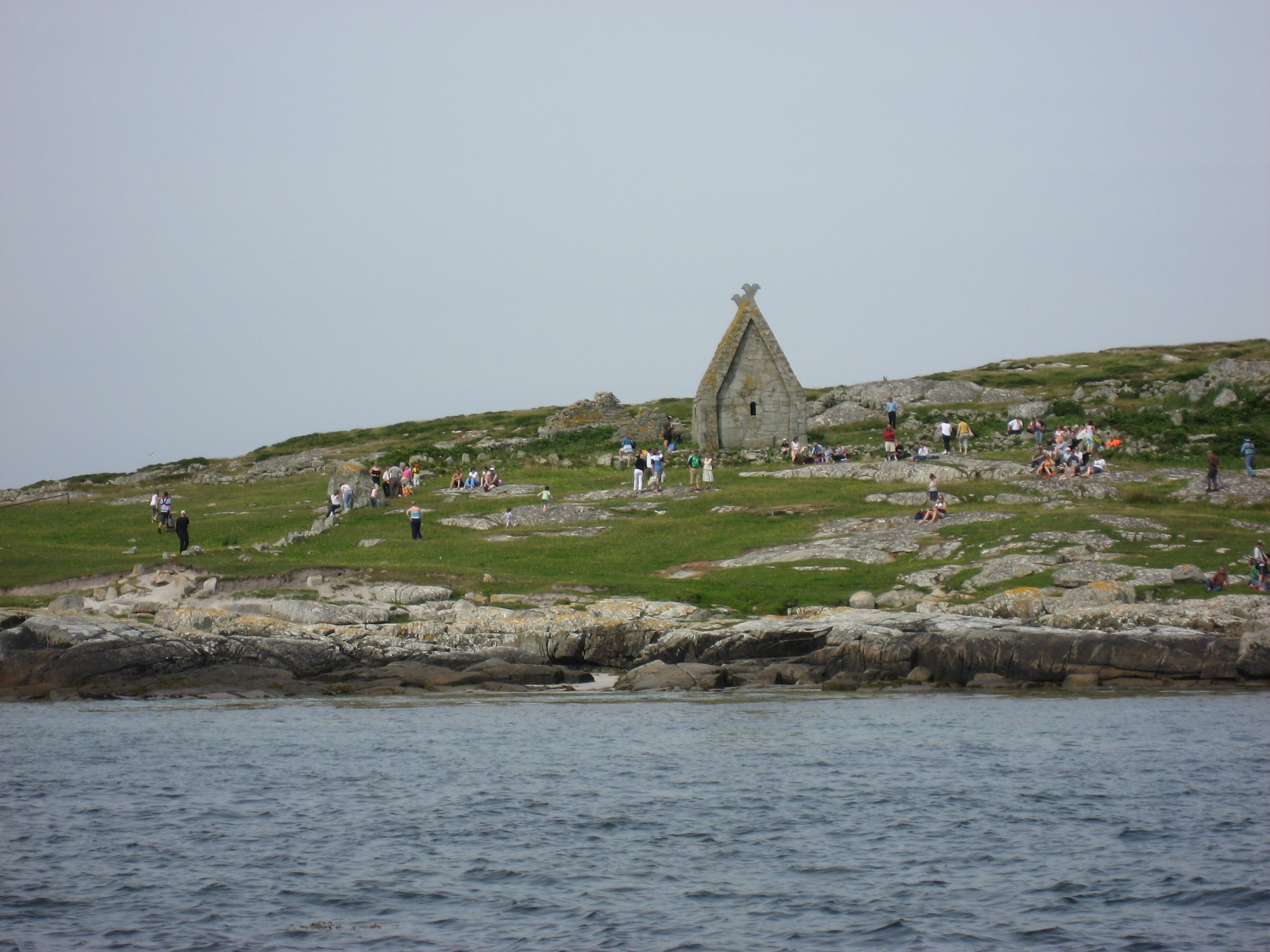
St. Macdara’s Island

Mac Dara was a sixth century Irish Christian saint who lived on an island off the west coast of Ireland. His feast day is September 28; the Féile Mhic Dara (Feast of Macdara) occurs on July 16.

== History ==
His name was Sinach Mac Dara. As "sionach" is a word associated with stormy weather, it was not used in preference to his patronym. Saint Macdara's Island off the coast of County Galway "was home in the sixth century to St. Macdara, Connemara's most respected saint, who built a one-room chapel here" which is "considered one of the finest early Christian oratories in Ireland". Mac Dara's wooden church was subsequently replaced by one of stone. The oratory was restored in 1975 and appeared on a series of five definitive stamps between 1982 and 1986.

== Pattern day ==
The Saint's name does not appear in any of the Calendars or Martyrologies, but he has found a place in the Rev. Canon O'Hanlon's Lives of The Saints. Mac Dara is the patron saint of west Connacht fishermen, and the parish of Moyrus, where the church was named for him. It is an old tradition to dip the sails when passing between the island and Mace Head. The fishermen do not go out on July 16, Macdara's feast day. Instead people celebrate Féile Mhic Dara with a pilgrimage from nearby Moyrus beach to the island, where a Mass is celebrated, followed by a blessing of boats, a picnic, and boat races. The pilgrims then return to Carna for a Céilidh and music.

MacDara was a common first name in Connemara. The inhabitants also called their boats after him, and to sail in such was considered a guarantee of safety.

The spelling of the name has a number of different variations including MacDara, Macdarragh and Macdarra. Mac is Irish for Son and Dara is Irish for Oak so the literal translation of Macdara is Son of Oak. One of the most prominent modern uses of the name is a second-level school located in the south of Dublin city named St Mac Dara's College.

== See also ==
- Saint Macdara's Island
- Macdara Ó Fátharta, Irish actor
- Macdara Woods, Irish poet
