= Storm Éowyn =

2025 windstorm over the British Isles and eastern Norway

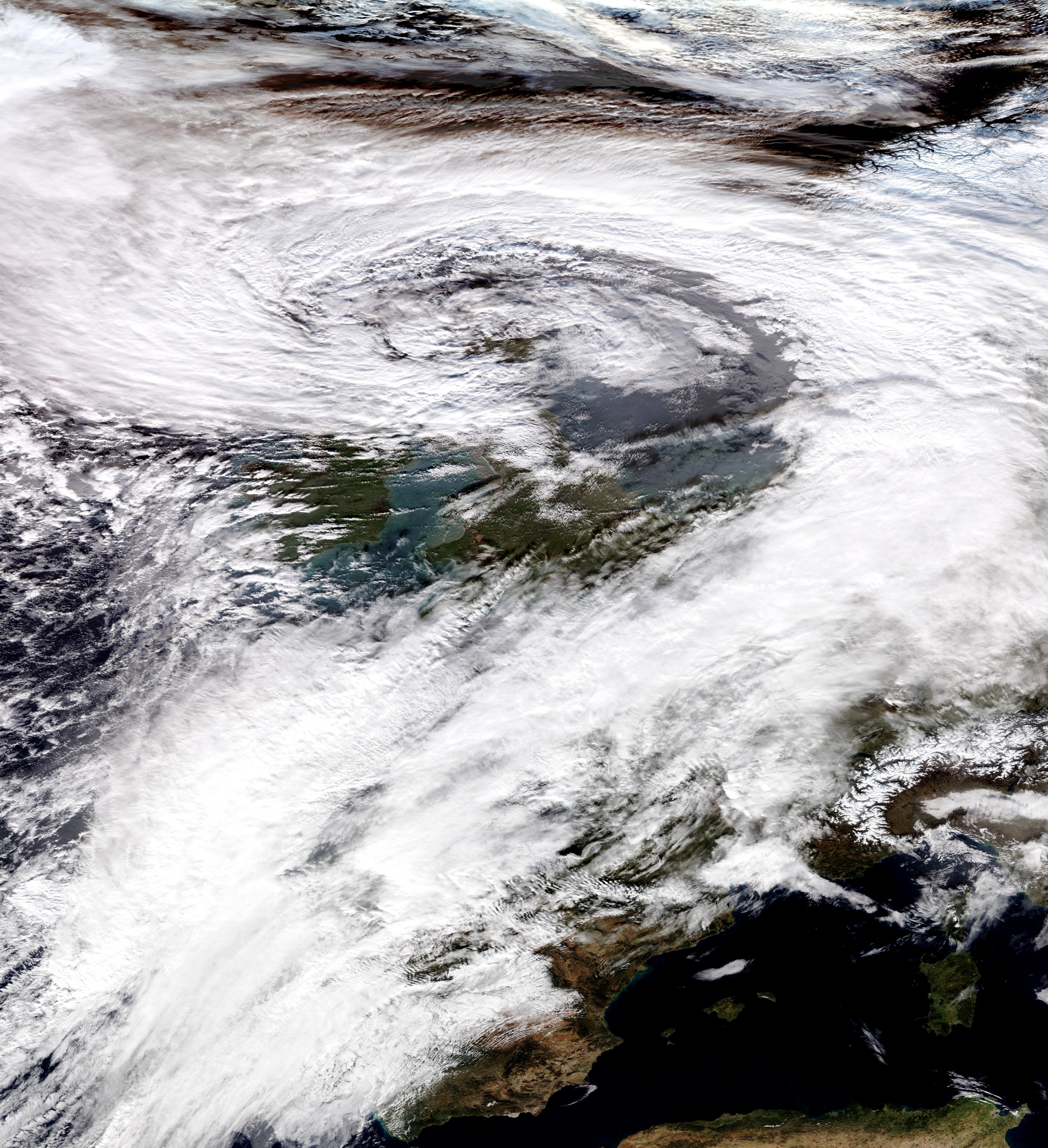
- Éowyn as seen on 24 January 2025

Meteorological history
- Formed: 21 January 2025
- Dissipated: 27 January 2025

Extratropical cyclone
- Highest winds: 156 km/h (97 mph) in Great Dun Fell, a mountain in England. 135 km/h (84 mph) at Mace Head, a coastal weather station in Ireland.
- Highest gusts: 217 km/h (135 mph) at Cairnwell, a mountain in Scotland near Braemar. 183 km/h (114 mph) at Mace Head.
- Lowest pressure: 941.9 hPa (mbar); 27.81 inHg on Tiree, Scotland

Overall effects
- Fatalities: 3
- Injuries: 5+
- Areas affected: Ireland, Isle of Man, Great Britain and western Scandinavia
- Power outages: 1,114,340+ 768,000 in Ireland; 240,000 in Northern Ireland; 340 in Isle of Man; 106,000 in Scotland; Thousands in Wales; Thousands in England; Unknown in Western Norway
- Part of the 2024–25 European windstorm season

Storm Éowyn (/ˈeɪoʊwɪn/ AY-oh-win) was a powerful and record-breaking extratropical cyclone which hit Ireland, the Isle of Man and the United Kingdom on 24 January 2025 and hit Norway on the night of 24 January into 25 January 2025. The twenty-seventh storm of the 2024–25 European windstorm season (and the fifth to be named by the western naming group comprising the United Kingdom, Ireland and the Netherlands), Éowyn was named by the UK Met Office on 21 January 2025.

Widespread red weather warnings were issued across Ireland, Scotland and the Isle of Man, whilst amber and yellow warnings were issued around Wales, England and Norway ahead of the rapidly strengthening storm. It was the most powerful and severe storm to hit Ireland since Hurricane Debbie in 1961, with wind records breaking an 80-year-old record for the country.

== Storm name ==
On 21 January 2025, the UK Met Office and associated organisations in Europe used the name "Éowyn" for the fifth storm of the 2024–2025 season. Éowyn is a fictional character in J. R. R. Tolkien's novel The Lord of the Rings and the name was taken from a list based on suggestions by the public.

== Background ==
The storm was fueled by a strong jet stream and energy from a blizzard a few days earlier, which had brought significant snow to the Gulf Coast of the United States.

== Warnings and preparations ==
Map plotting the storm's track and intensity, according to the Saffir–Simpson scale Map key Saffir–Simpson scale Tropical depression (≤38 mph, ≤62 km/h) Tropical storm (39–73 mph, 63–118 km/h) Category 1 (74–95 mph, 119–153 km/h) Category 2 (96–110 mph, 154–177 km/h) Category 3 (111–129 mph, 178–208 km/h) Category 4 (130–156 mph, 209–251 km/h) Category 5 (≥157 mph, ≥252 km/h) Unknown Storm type Tropical cyclone Subtropical cyclone Extratropical cyclone, remnant low, tropical disturbance, or monsoon depression

=== Ireland ===
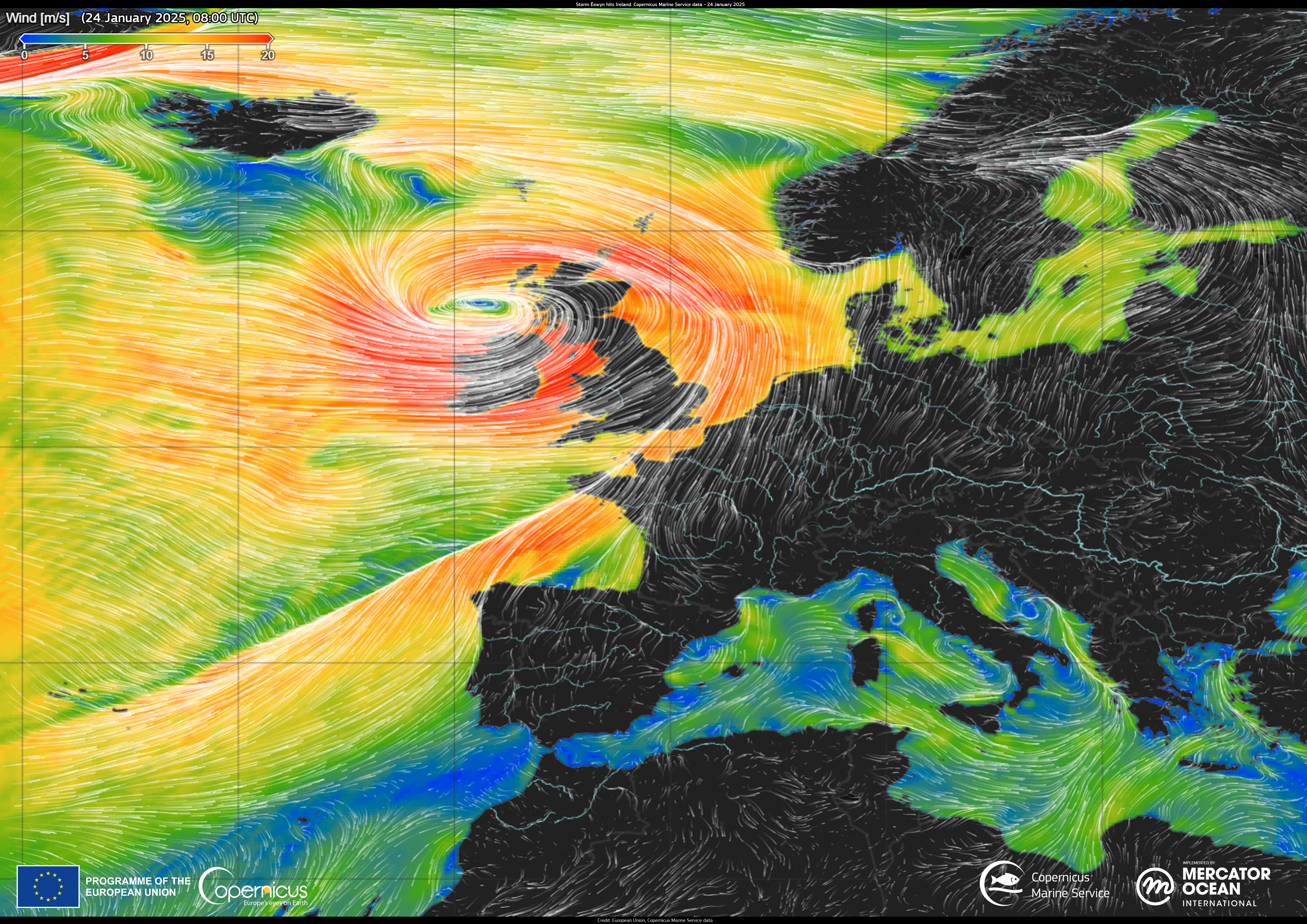
Storm Éowyn as it approached Ireland on 24 January 2025 at 08:00 UTC/GMT.

On 22 January 2025, in anticipation of the storm's arrival, the Irish meteorological service Met Éireann issued an orange wind warning for all 26 counties of Ireland for the period 02:00 to 17:00 UTC/GMT on 24 January 2025 and, in addition, a red wind warning for counties Clare, Cork, Kerry and Limerick covering the period 03:00 to 10:00 on 24 January 2025. Met Éireann predicted 130 km/h (81 mph) gusts widely, with even higher gusts for a time. On 23 January 2025, Met Éireann and the UK Met Office issued updated red weather warnings for 24 January 2025 covering all counties of the island of Ireland. Anticipated impacts included fallen trees, damage to power lines and power outages, structural damage as well as disruption and cancellations to transport with wave overtopping for coastal areas, especially in the west.

All schools, preschools, colleges and universities were ordered to close for the entire day. Non-essential services ceased and many supermarkets either closed for the whole day or opened after the red alert was lifted in the area.

The Hurricane Hunter aircraft of the U.S. National Oceanic and Atmospheric Administration (NOAA) were deployed to Shannon Airport on 22 January, in order to conduct operations studying Storm Éowyn as it approached landfall. It was the first time the Hurricane Hunter aircraft had been deployed to Europe since Hurricane Ophelia in 2017.

=== Isle of Man ===
On 23 January 2025, the Met Office issued a red warning for the Isle of Man, the first in seven years, as life-threatening winds reached 137 km/h (85 mph) on 24 January between 07:00 and 14:00. The last red warning had been issued for wind during Storm Eleanor in 2018. Flying debris posed extreme danger, prompting urgent calls for people to stay indoors. All schools, buses, and the A18 Mountain Road closed by 05:00. Ferry services to Lancashire and flights were cancelled, and the airport remained shut until 16:00.

=== United Kingdom ===
According to Met Office forecasts, Storm Éowyn was expected to bring strong winds to much of the UK, with gusts of up to 121 km/h (75 mph) inland and 130 km/h (80 mph) in coastal areas, particularly in Northern Ireland, northern England, northwestern Wales, and southern central Scotland. Heavy rainfall was predicted to affect many areas, causing disruptions. The forecast also predicted that some initial snow might fall in northern areas, transitioning to rain as milder air moved in.

As of 16:30, three yellow wind warnings were in force: one for Scotland and Shetland, another for more central parts of England, northern England, and Northern Ireland. There had also been another for the southwest of England, the entire south coast, and through the northwest Midlands.

Yellow weather warnings for "very strong winds" were issued across the UK for a 24-hour period on 24 January 2025, covering the East Midlands, West Midlands, London and southeast England, northwest England, southwest England, Wales, Yorkshire, and Humber. On 22 January 2025, the Met Office issued an amber wind warning covering north Wales, north midlands, northern England, southern Scotland and Northern Ireland. Winds in the amber warning area were expected to reach 97–113 km/h (60–70 mph) inland, 110–130 km/h (70–80 mph) in some areas, and potentially over 140 km/h (90 mph) in exposed coastal and hilly regions. Winds would briefly decrease as the storm's centre passes, primarily affecting Northern Ireland and western Scotland, before intensifying again. A rare red warning for extreme and damaging winds was issued for Northern Ireland and Southern Central Scotland. Winds in the red warning zone were expected to reach 121–129 km/h (75–80 mph) inland (higher winds for Glasgow around 129–137 km/h (80–85 mph)) and 137–153 km/h (85–95 mph), possibly 160 km/h (100 mph) on coasts. Winds would gradually ease later on 24 January 2025, although some strong winds could still affect Scotland. Also, a new yellow wind warning was issued for East Anglia, the East Midlands, the south-east and the London area. An additional amber weather warning was added at 13:00 on 24 January until 06:00 on 25 January, covering most of Scotland. Within the warning area, gusts of 64–80 km/h (40–50 mph) were likely for a time, perhaps higher on exposed coasts and hills, before easing through the afternoon.

On 23 January 2025, a 'red' emergency alert was sent to mobile devices across Northern Ireland at 17:25 UTC and in parts of Scotland at 17:53 UTC. The alert was broadcast to around 4.5 million devices making it the largest scale use of the UK's emergency alert system since its introduction in April 2023.

Additional areas expected to be affected included Tayside and Fife, Grampian, Highlands and Eilean Siar, Northern Ireland, Orkney and Shetland, southwest Scotland, Lothian Borders, and Strathclyde. A further yellow wind warning has been issued for parts of northern England and Scotland on Saturday. A yellow snow warning was issued for central and northern Scotland where outbreaks of rain spreading north-eastward on the morning of 24 January will fall as snow initially, especially on hills, before reverting to rain and eventually easing. Any accumulations across northern England and southern Scotland will be fairly short-lived and largely on hills, where 2–5 cm (0.79–1.97 in) may accumulate in places above 100 m (330 ft) elevation and 5–10 cm (2.0–3.9 in) above 300 m (980 ft). Snow will probably persist for longer north of the Central Belt of Scotland, where as much as 15–25 cm (5.9–9.8 in) is possible above 300 m (980 ft). Given the strong winds expected to accompany the snow, temporary blizzard conditions were considered possible over higher ground, with some drifting also possible for a time, this was probably more likely north of the Central Belt.

==== Scotland ====
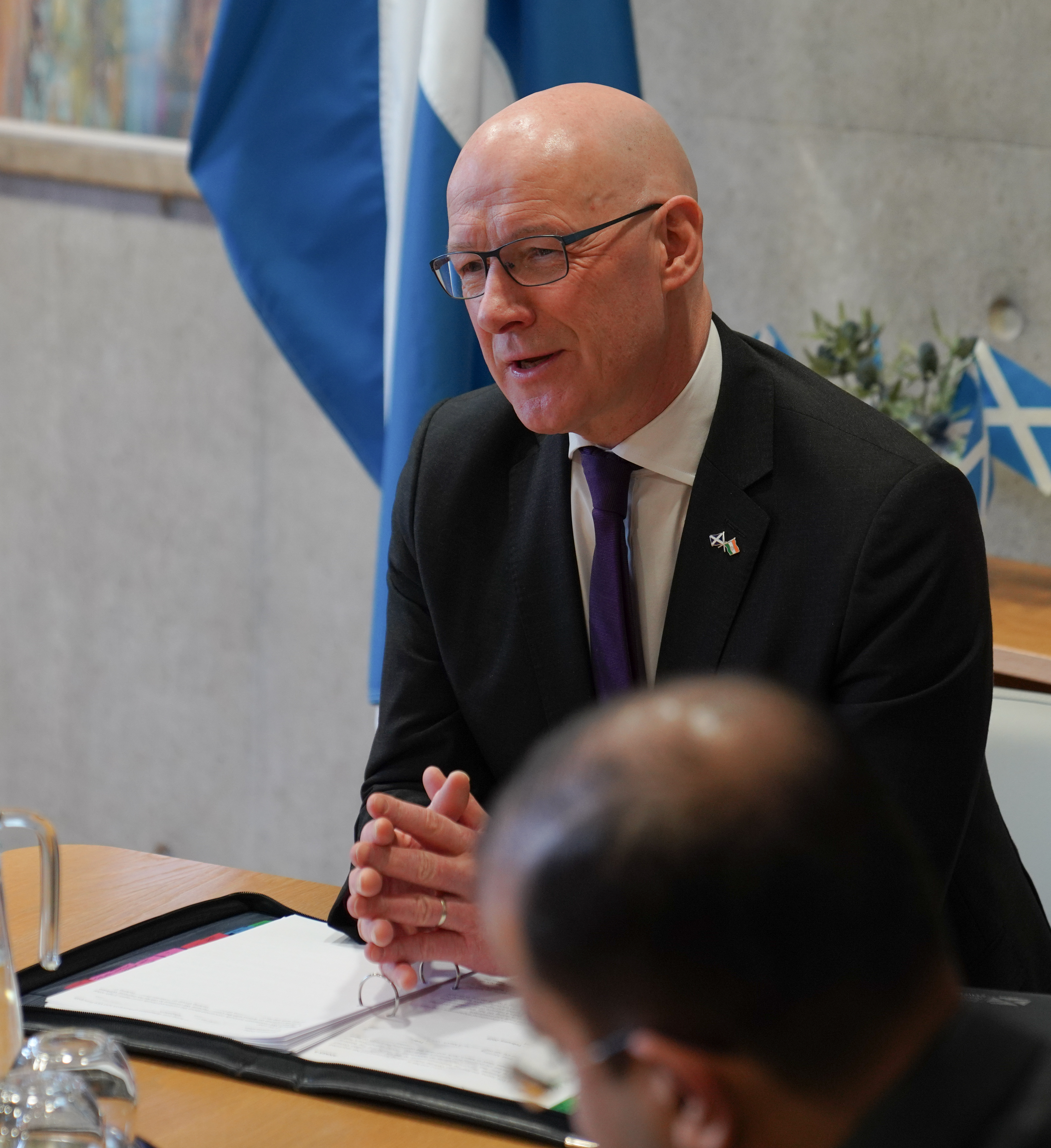
First Minister of Scotland, John Swinney, activated the Scottish Government Resilience Room on 23 January

Ahead of the storm, Transport Scotland warned of severe disruption to the travel network, with Police Scotland advising the public not to travel in the areas covered by the Red alert issued by the Met Office. The 'Transport Scotland Resilience Room' and the 'Multi-Agency Response Team was activated ahead of the storm reaching Scotland, to monitor the situation and condition of the transport network across the country, with Transport Scotland' providing regular updates to the public.

On the morning of 23 January 2025, one day before the storm was expected to make landfall in Scotland, the Scottish Government activated the Scottish Government Resilience Room (SGoRR) to monitor the rapidly developing situation and threat, and also to begin to co-ordinate the Scottish Government response to the storm. First Minister, John Swinney, issued a public statement, highlighting that the "Met Office has, this morning, issued a very rare red weather warning for Storm Éowyn tomorrow. Their advice is clear that potential impacts include danger to life, structural damage to property, and transport and power disruptions". Swinney assured the public that the Scottish Government was ready to respond to the storm and associated damage, announcing that the resilience room had been activated to "co-ordinate help and to support Scotland's front-line responders, including police fire services and the ambulance service". Chief Superintendent, Hilary Sloan, Head of Police Scotland Road Policing said also issued a public statement, stating "the advice of the police throughout the duration of the red weather warning is not to travel, as the conditions outside and on the road network could be extremely hazardous and put you at risk".

=== Norway ===
On 23 January 2025, MET Norway issued a yellow warning for Western Norway due to storm Éowyn. The warning was in effect during the night of 24 January into 25 January.

== Impact ==
=== Ireland ===
==== 24 to 31 January 2025 ====
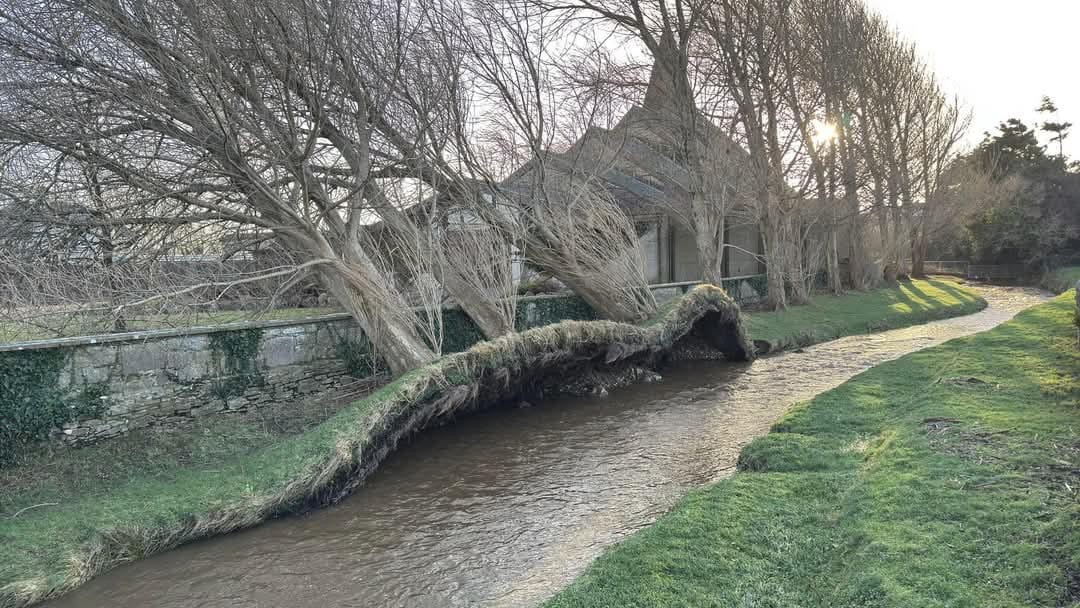
Destruction of the riverbank on the River Brick at St. Bernard's Church in Abbeydorney, County Kerry following Storm Éowyn.

On 24 January at around 05:00, a wind gust provisionally measured at 183 km/h (114 mph) was recorded at Mace Head Atmospheric Research Station in Connemara in County Galway. The official highest wind gust from the storm in Ireland was 183 km/h (114 mph), surpassing an 80-year-old record for the country when a wind gust of 113 mph (182 km/h) at Foynes was measured in 1945. Moneypoint weather station (anemometer height 40 m (130 ft) above ground level) measured a 159.8 km/h (99.3 mph) wind gust at 04:10. The intensity of winds at Mace Head (Ceann Mhása), Belmullet, and Markree (near Sligo) caused data interruption to local weather instruments. A mean sustained wind speed of 135 km/h (84 mph) was measured at Mace Head at around 04:00, surpassing the previous Irish record of 131 km/h (81 mph) set in 1945 at Foynes.

A maximum wave height of 10.4 m (34 ft) was measured by the coast of Finnis Buoy, near Doolin.

All flights from 08:00 to 14:00 at Ireland West Airport were cancelled. Several flights at Dublin Airport and Shannon Airport were cancelled or delayed. Aer Arann and Aran Island Ferries announced the closure of all morning services.

At 09:00, 815,000 houses, farms and businesses on the island of Ireland were suffering from power outages, particularly in counties Galway and Mayo and 115,000 homes, mainly in Munster, were without water. By lunchtime, nearly one million were without power on the island of Ireland. The country's worst storm since Hurricane Debbie in 1961 resulted in 768,000 without power at its peak in Ireland. The Electricity Supply Board spoke of extensive damage to electricity infrastructure on an unprecedented scale. As of 25 January, 217,000 households were without water as Uisce Éireann's water treatment plants were disrupted by power cuts. Customers in Galway were worst-affected. Telecommunications regulator ComReg reported that the destruction caused by the storm on telecommunications infrastructure was the largest in Ireland's recorded history. Telecommunications company eir reported that 270,000 fixed-line users were without broadband after the storm.

Several instances of downed trees in both counties and in Munster were also reported. Several families in Munster required evacuation after their homes were destroyed or severely damaged by strong winds, with many cases involving roofs being blown off. At least six to seven downed trees were reported on the N4 road near Newtown Forbes, County Longford, blocking the village off from both ends. Most roads in Longford had trees fall on them. The Connacht GAA Air Dome in County Mayo, which cost over €3.5 million to construct, was destroyed. A 20-year-old man in County Donegal died, when a tree fell on his car.

On 27 January, the National Emergency Co-ordination Group (NECG), the Department of Social Protection's Humanitarian Assistance Scheme and some local authorities set up emergency response hubs to those still without power and/or water. These hubs provide "basic needs such as water, hot food, phone charging, broadband access, shower and clothes washing facilities". On this date, 438,000 electricity customers have had their power restored with 330,000 still without power, with power not being restored for up to 100,000 customers until the following week. Engineers from the United Kingdom have been helping ESB repair crews to restore power. Water company Uisce Éireann said 109,000 of their customers were still without water and declared 126,000 customers were a risk of losing their water supply and that 112,000 customers were being provided water via generators. Eir declared that 110,000 customers had had their Internet restored with 94,000 customers still without.

Ireland had asked the EU for help due to the power outages, with the activation of the EU Civil Protection Mechanism providing thirteen power generators from Poland and Denmark providing an additional four. The Copernicus Emergency Management Service was also activated. Additionally, 10 Austrian and 40 Finnish engineers arrived on 28 January to assist ESB crews. Additionally, electrical engineers from Finland, France and the Netherlands arrived to help ESB crews on 29 and 30 January. If necessary, engineers from Germany will be asked to help the ESB.

==== February 2025 ====
On 2 February 2025, 10 days after Storm Éowyn hit Ireland, the ESB has restored power to 729,000 customers, but around 39,000 were still without electricity. Technicians from Austria, Finland, France, Great Britain, Germany, Netherlands and Norway assisted with repairs in the hardest-hit areas.

On 5 February 2025 Sinn Féin TD Rose Conway-Walsh told the Dáil that the father of a constituent died while seeking medical help. His vital medical devices, including sleep apnea equipment had stopped working due to power outages.

Additionally on 5 February, during a Dáil debate on Storm Éowyn, Minister Dara Calleary said the Department of Social Protection had provided €727,792 in payments to those without power. Transport Minister Darragh O'Brien reported 18,000 people still without electricity, with the priority being to restore it safely. Sinn Féin's Claire Kerrane criticised the Government for delayed responses, especially in Roscommon and Galway, and called for better protection of power lines. Other Sinn Féin TDs highlighted ongoing challenges, while Labour leader Ivana Bacik shared the emotional toll on families affected by power outages. Social Democrats' Jennifer Whitmore and others also expressed frustration with the lack of coordination and support.

On 7 February, ESB Networks confirmed that repair costs from Storm Éowyn will not affect electricity prices in 2025. While CEO Paddy Hayes initially suggested the cleanup could cost "tens of millions," he later apologised for his remarks and clarified that it is too early to determine the costs. As of two weeks after the storm, 5,500 customers remained without power. Future price adjustments may occur after 2026, depending on the review by regulators. The full cost of repairs remained unclear. Any future price hikes would depend on changes in charges from ESB Networks and EirGrid.

In the early afternoon of 9 February, it was announced that 1,500 electricity customers remained without power. Additionally, 0.36% of water customers and 0.13% of mobile customers were still experiencing outages or interruptions. The NECG held a meeting on Sunday (9 February) to coordinate the ongoing restoration of essential services like electricity, water, and telecommunications. Storm Éowyn left more areas without power than any previous storm.

In the late evening of 9 February, it was reported that approximately 700 electricity customers were still without power over two weeks after Storm Éowyn. ESB Networks aimed to complete most of the reconnections by Sunday (9 February) evening, though some areas will remain without power overnight. The remaining outages were mainly in counties Roscommon, Mayo, north Galway and south Leitrim. Technicians from Austria, Finland, the UK, Germany, and Norway continued assisting alongside 2,500 ESB Networks personnel, partner contractors, and additional support from other regions of Ireland, including experienced retirees. Over 1,300 staff members were handling logistics, emergency calls, damage assessments, and network management. The NECG was also addressing disruptions to water, telecommunications, and other services. Study hubs were set up for students preparing for exams who were struggling with internet access.

On 12 February, ESB Networks announced that power had now been restored to the over 768,000 customers affected by Storm Éowyn. Over €1.2 million was distributed through the Humanitarian Assistance Scheme (HAS) to those affected, with an average payment of €210 per claim. Sinn Féin has called for expanded support to include businesses and community groups, alongside a goodwill payment from ESB based on outage duration. They also proposed suspending standing charges and the Public Service Obligation levy. The Government defended its response, stating a comprehensive review will be conducted to improve future resilience, while ESB maintains it does not compensate for outages caused by severe weather. Emergency response hubs remain operational in Galway and Mayo to support those still experiencing broadband issues.

On 18 February 2025, ComReg reported that 3,500 fixed-line users were still without a broadband service. Eir estimated that all services would be restored by the end of February. On 20 February 2025, Insurance Ireland, the insurance sector representative body in Ireland, estimated that the cost of insurance claims arising from the storm damage could reach €300 million, making it the most expensive weather event in Ireland in 25 years.

==== Ongoing issues ====
In April 2025 it was reported that 20 to 30 houses in Mayo were still without a telephone landline connection, over 70 days after the storm. Also in April, it was reported that an estimated 24,000 hectares of forestry were blown down by the storm.

In January 2026 Ireland's semi-state forestry company, Coillte, announced that its clean up operation would continue until mid-2027. It said that over 26,000 hectares of forest were damaged by the storm with 50 million trees lost or damaged. The cost of the clean up was estimated at over €60 million.

=== Scotland ===
An Emergency Alert System issued across the central belt of Scotland by the Scottish Government, 23 January 2025

Storm Éowyn made landfall in Scotland on 24 January 2025, leaving around 117,000 homes across the country without power and electricity supply, with wind speeds as high as 164 km/h (102 mph) recorded on the Tay Road Bridge. Swinney appealed to the public to have a "high level of vigilance", and expressed concerns about the number of HGVs on Scottish roads, claiming that "too many lorries are on the road and I urge all HGVs to follow Police Scotland advice not to travel during the red weather warning". All ScotRail train services were suspended and did not return to service until midday the following day. The Scottish Government Resilience Room met again on the evening of 24 January to co-ordinate the Scottish Government's response to the storm. Swinney praised the public for following advice from Police Scotland not to travel, attributing to "areas covered by the red warning has seen road usage been about 85% less than normal, and that is thanks to so many people heeding the advice not to travel". Glasgow Airport and Edinburgh Airport limited Flight Operations from 10:00 to 17:00, causing cancellations of flights. At around 14:15, Drumalbin weather station in South Lanarkshire recorded 163 km/h (101 mph), the highest wind gust in Scotland from Storm Éowyn so far.

Two people suffered injuries from storm related accidents in Scotland, one of whom – a 19-year-old from East Ayrshire – subsequently died. The 19-year-old male was later identified as Calum Carmichael. An SPFL game between Celtic and Dundee was postponed on 25 January due to damages to Celtic Park due to the storm.

Following the passing of the storm, the Scottish Government Resilience Room was activated once again on 25 January by first minister John Swinney to co-ordinate the recovery efforts in the aftermath of Storm Éowyn. Swinney also joined a meeting of the Cabinet Office Briefing Rooms which was chaired by the Chancellor of the Duchy of Lancaster, Pat McFadden. Swinney advised the public that "partners are working at pace to ensure services can resume next week. Local authorities – who are responsible for school closures - will be working to ensure all buildings meet the required safety standards to reopen safely to pupils". Swinney also advised that the public "should prepare for continued disruption, especially in areas that have been impacted by a loss of power, and I encourage everyone to follow advice being issued by local authorities, as well as continuing to follow updates from national agencies".

Swinney issued a public statement on 25 January calling for "patience" as the cleanup operation began. Amber warnings for ice, snow and wind remained in place in most parts of Scotland over the weekend (24–26 January). Swinney stated that it was "clear the severity of Storm Éowyn will continue into next week and this will have an impact on the speed at which utilities and local services can fully resume". By the evening of 26 January, the Scottish Government stated that "significant progress" had been made regarding the recovery efforts across the country, but some impacts from the storm were "set to continue". Approximately 265,000 people had their electricity restored by the evening of the 26 January, with road, ferry and aviation networks returning to "a near normal service". As of 20:00 on 26 January, roughly 16,000 people across Scotland were still without power.

=== Isle of Man ===
All travel to and from the Isle of Man was suspended, including ferries between Douglas and Heysham operated by the Isle of Man Steam Packet Company, as well as Bus Vannin services. Closures include the Isle of Man Airport, the Snaefell mountain road, and schools and government offices. Around 370 homes lost power. The Isle of Man Government declared a major incident part way through the red alert as main roads were blocked, cutting off many parts of the island.

The island's airport recorded the highest wind gusts in 20 years.

=== England ===
On 23 January, Devon and Cornwall Police said that one person was injured at Holywell Bay, near Newquay, where there had been "caravans blowing". This event was later confirmed by the ESWD as an IF2 Tornado.

There were also thousands of homes without power in County Durham and a number of road closures, including on the A19 and A689.

=== Northern Ireland ===
As of 11:30 on 24 January, over 240,000 homes and business were without power in Northern Ireland.

On 2 February 2025, 10 days after Storm Éowyn hit Northern Ireland, around 1,600 customers remained without power. Storm Éowyn caused outages affecting 285,000 customers. NIE Networks has deployed over 1,550 personnel, with further support arriving. The company also warned of scammers posing as staff and advised the public to report any concerns to the PSNI.

=== Wales ===
Places affected were Ysbyty Gwynedd hospital in Bangor and the communities of Bethesda, Tregarth, Llanbedr, Blaenau Ffestiniog and Menai Bridge on Anglesey. There were widespread power cuts across Wales.

=== Norway ===
The remnants of the storm hit Norway on 24 and 25 January, causing power outages. It was the worst storm in Norway since the 1992 New Year's Day Storm.

== See also ==
- Beaufort scale
- Burns' Day Storm of 1990
- Boxing Day Storm of 1998
- Great Storm of 1987
- Hurricane Ophelia (2017)
- Night of the Big Wind
- Storm Eunice
