= Marine Casualty Investigation Board =

Maritime accident investigation agency of Ireland

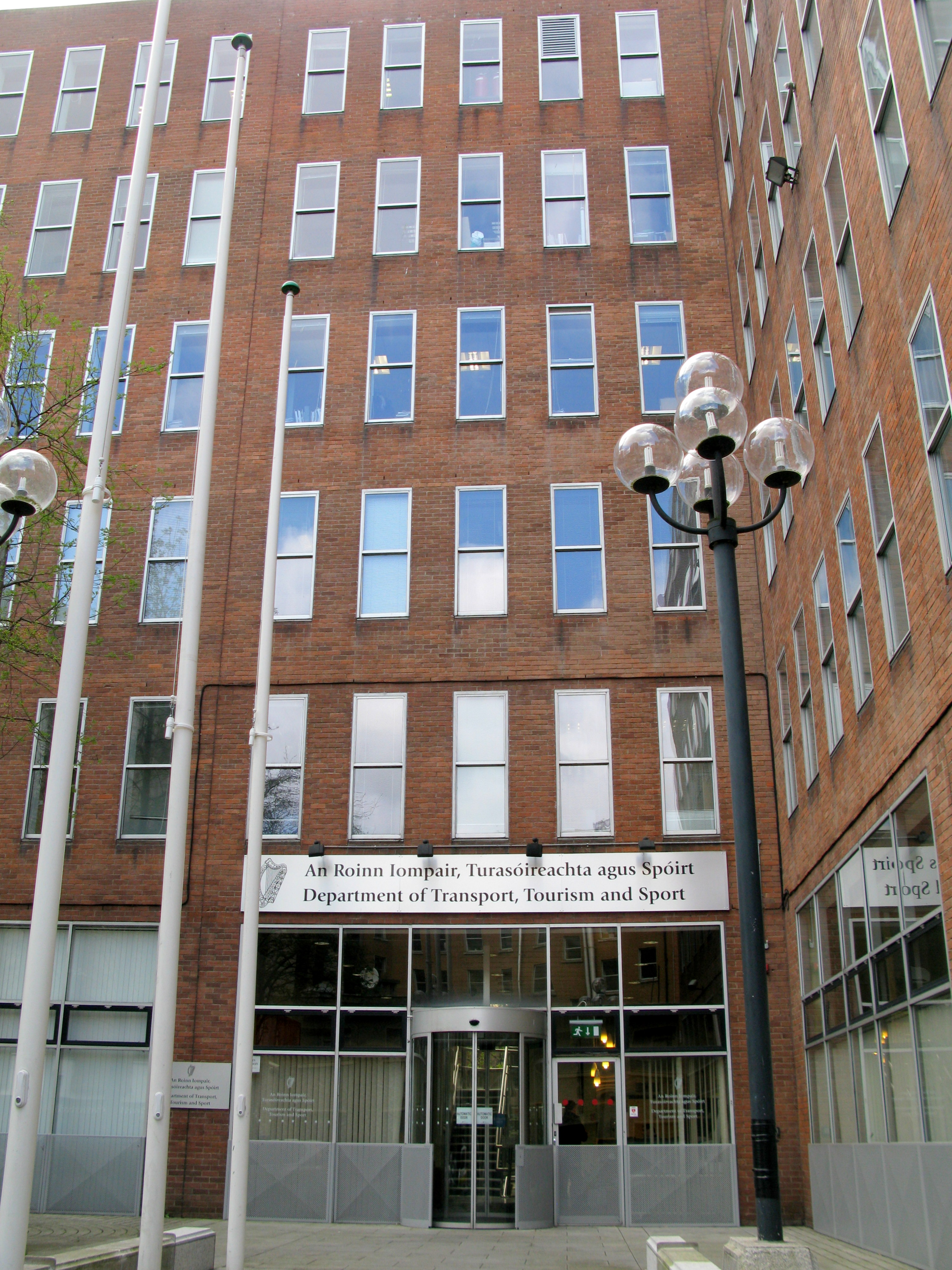
The MCIB is located within the Department of Transport, Tourism and Sport on Leeson Lane, Dublin

The Marine Casualty Investigation Board (MCIB, Irish: Bord Imscrúdú Taismí Muirí) is the Irish government agency for investigating maritime accidents and incidents. Its head office is in Dublin.

The agency, created as a result of the Merchant Shipping (Investigation of Marine Casualties) Act, 2000, was established on 5 June 2002.
