= List of sting jet cyclones =

This is a list of documented and unconfirmed sting jet occurrences.

== List of sting jet cyclones ==
Confirmed sting jet cyclones
Cyclone / Storm Name	Type	Date	Reference	Location
Great storm of 1987	European windstorm	15 – 17 October 1987		Southern England
Oratia	European windstorm	30 October 2000		North Sea (Lincolnshire to Norway)
Anna	European windstorm	26 February 2002		Central Pennines, England
Jeanette	European windstorm	27 October 2002		Wales and the English Midlands
Erwin (Gudrun)	European windstorm	7 – 9 January 2005		Northern England
Unnamed	Extratropical cyclone	7 – 8 December 2005		East of Canada
Friedhelm	European windstorm	8 December 2011		Central Belt, Scotland
Ulli	European windstorm	3 – 4 January 2012		Central Belt, Scotland
St Jude storm (Cyclone Christian)	European windstorm	28 October 2013		East Anglia, North Sea, Netherlands, Germany, Denmark
Cyclone Tini (Storm Darwin)	European windstorm	12 February 2014		Southern Ireland, Irish Sea, Wales
Egon	European windstorm	12 – 13 January 2017		Northern France, South-West Germany
Hurricane Humberto	Hurricane	19 September 2019		Bermuda
Storm Eunice	European windstorm	14 – 18 February 2022		Isle of Wight, Southern England
Storm Éowyn	European windstorm	23 – 24 January 2025		Ireland
Storm Goretti	European windstorm	6 – 10 January 2026		West Cornwall, Channel Islands, Northern France
Storm Kristin	European windstorm	27 – 31 January 2026		Portugal

== List of unconfirmed sting jets ==
Unconfirmed or candidate sting jet cyclones
Cyclone / Storm Name	Type	Date	Reference	Location
New Year's Day Storm	European windstorm	1 January 1992		Norway
Renate	European windstorm	3 October 2006		Bay of Biscay, Aquitaine, France
Oeste Storm (Xola)	European windstorm	23 December 2009		Portugal
October 2010 Storm Complex	Great Lakes cyclone	26 – 27 October 2010		Midwestern United States
2011 Halloween Nor'easter	Nor'easter	30 – 31 October 2011		Northeastern United States
Unnamed	Extratropical cyclone	12 March 2012		Upper Midwestern United States
Unnamed	Black Sea cyclone	2 – 3 December 2012		Romania, Black Sea
Gong	European windstorm	19 January 2013		Portugal
Arthur	Extratropical cyclone (ex-Hurricane)	5 July 2014		Canadian Maritimes, Canada
Elon (Nathan)	European windstorm	9 January 2015		Scotland, Great Britain
Zeus	European windstorm	6 March 2017		Brittany, France
Unnamed	Low-pressure area	4 May 2018		Southern Ontario, Canada
Hurricane Milton	Hurricane	9 – 10 October 2024		Florida, United States
Hurricane Isaias	Hurricane	9 October 2026		Northwest Florida and Alabama, United States
