= St. Jude storm =

European windstorm in 2013

Cyclone Christian St. Jude storm Cyclone Simone
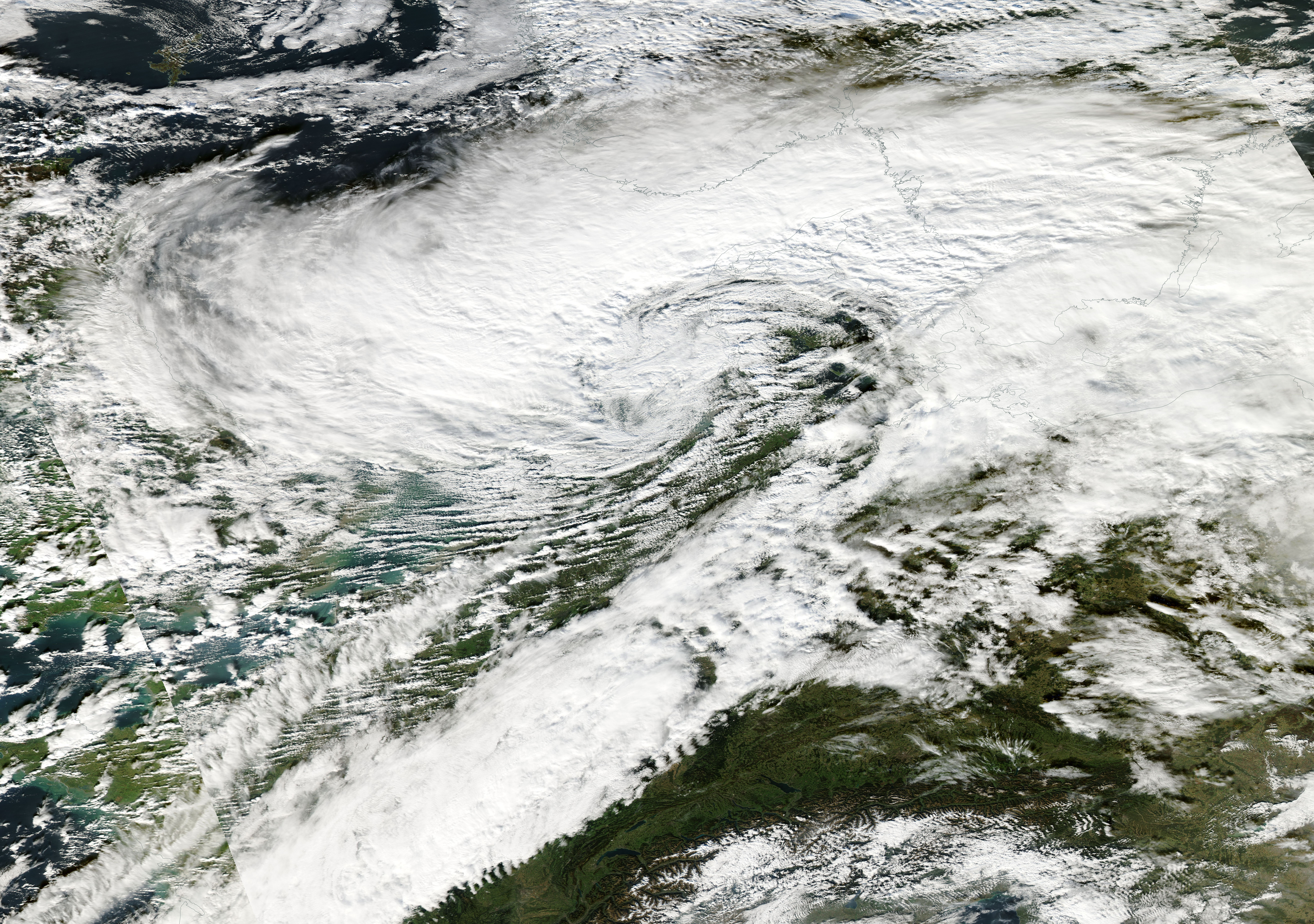
- Christian making landfall in Denmark on 28 October 2013.

Meteorological history
- Formed: 26 October 2013
- Dissipated: 31 October 2013

Extratropical cyclone
- Highest gusts: 194.4 km/h (120.8 mph; 105.0 kn), Als, Denmark
- Lowest pressure: 967 hPa (mbar); 28.56 inHg

Overall effects
- Fatalities: 17
- Missing: 1
- Areas affected: United Kingdom, France, Belgium, Netherlands, Germany, Denmark, Sweden, Norway, Latvia, Estonia, Finland, Russia

The St. Jude storm, also known as Cyclone Christian, and other names, was a severe hurricane-force European windstorm that hit Northwestern Europe on 27 and 28 October 2013 causing at least 17 deaths. The highest windspeed was in Denmark, where a gust of 194.4 km/h (120.8 mph) was recorded in the south of the country (in Als) on the afternoon of 28 October, the strongest wind recorded in the country's history.

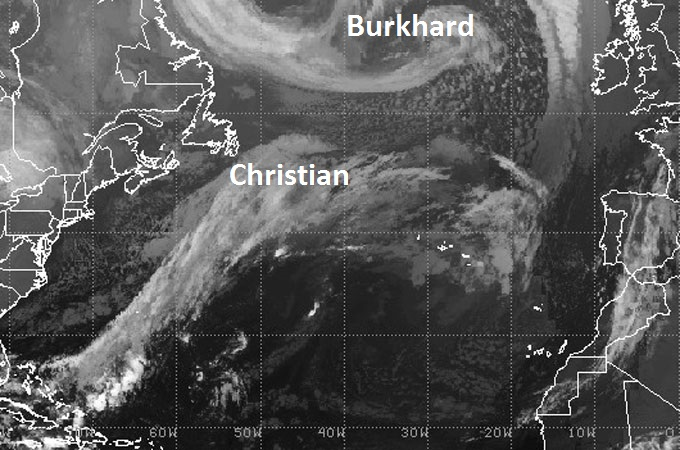
Satellite image 26 October 2013 at 1012 UTC showing the position of the St. Jude Storm (Storm Christian) forming over Northern Atlantic. At the top of the image, the low pressure "Burkhard".

== Name ==
Although it was reported that the storm was named by a clerk at the UK's Met Office, the Met Office themselves have stated that they do not know who named the storm. The storm was named by the Weather Channel UK meteorologist Leon Brown, after the feast of Saint Jude the Apostle, which takes place on 28 October, the day when the storm was expected to be at its height. The name is reported to have been popularised on Twitter before being adopted by the media in the United Kingdom.

The storm was named "Christian" on 26 October 2013 by the Free University of Berlin's meteorological institute. According to The Guardian, European Union institutions are officially referring to the storm as "Christian".

The Swedish Meteorological and Hydrological Institute named the storm "Simone", based on the Swedish name day list. The European Windstorm Centre, a UK-based forecaster, gave the storm the name "Carmen". The Danish Meteorological Institute referred to it as the October storm 2013 (Oktoberstormen 2013), but it was later named "Allan" per request from the Minister for Climate, Energy and Building, Martin Lidegaard.

Confusion over the name of the storm, particularly in the United Kingdom and Ireland, and subsequent severe impact, led the Met Office and Met Eireann to later start officially naming European windstorms, starting with the inaugural 2015–16 season's first system, Storm Abigail.

== Meteorological history ==
A depression formed off the east coast of the United States and headed east, assisted by the jet stream. The St. Jude storm formed in the western Atlantic as a secondary low on the southern flanks of an area of low pressure to the east of southern Greenland; this Icelandic Low was named "Burkhard" by the Free University of Berlin. The St. Jude storm formed from a wave front on 26 October in the northwest Atlantic off the Eastern seaboard of North America. The developing low moved under the jet stream passing by the remnants of ex-tropical storm Lorenzo situated in the mid Atlantic. The tropical air from this storm provided an input of energy, strengthening the jetstream, and helping to intensify the deepening of the low in an area closer to Europe than usual. This, together with a strong jet stream, led to a rapid deepening of the St. Jude low before it hit western Europe as a strengthening storm. The storm has been cited as both meeting and not meeting the strict criteria of explosive deepening. The storm system was swept across the Atlantic at a rapid pace moving eastwards with an average speed of 77 km/h (48 mph), and crossed over 2,000 km (1,200 mi) in less than 26 hours.

Across southern England two zones of strong winds were noted, the first ahead of the storm that battered the south coast, and a second zone that struck East Anglia and the South East as the storm passed over into the North Sea. This second zone of winds has been identified by meteorologists as potentially being a sting jet, an area where wind speeds are enhanced by cooled air rapidly descending from high in the storm. The storm developed as a baroclinic leaf over England. Over 20 hours between 27 October at 18:00 UTC and 28 October 14:00 UTC the central pressure of the storm dropped by 22 hPa (0.65 inHg). The storm intensified as it crossed the North Sea with the central pressure dropping to an estimated 965 mb (28.5 inHg), the lowest land-based pressure of 967.6 mb (28.57 inHg) was recorded at Thyboron, Denmark. The low pressure centre of the storm reached Finland at 01:00 UTC 29 October having only filled to 970 mb (29 inHg).

The storm made landfall in the early hours of 28 October. A gust of 159 km/h (99 mph) was recorded at The Needles Batteries, Isle of Wight. Over the British mainland peak gusts were limited to 120 km/h (75 mph). Speeds of 230 km/h (150 mph) were measured at the Gunfleet Sands Offshore Wind Farm.

On the Île d'Ouessant, Finistère, France, a gust of 133 km/h (83 mph) was recorded. On the Dutch coast and in the IJsselmeer, gusts of 90 to 130 km/h (56 to 81 mph) were recorded.

The storm was the strongest in the Netherlands since the Burns Day storm of 1990, with windgusts measuring speeds between 140 and 150 km/h (87 and 93 mph) at Wadden Sea.

Two private weather recording stations on the German islands of Borkum and Heligoland both recorded a possible low-elevation national wind speed record of 191 km/h (119 mph) on 28 October, with maximum sustained winds of 130 km/h (81 mph) which are as yet unverified by the German weather service.

A gust of 194.4 km/h (120.8 mph) was recorded in southern Denmark, the strongest wind recorded in the country's history, however the Danish Meteorological Institute is convinced that the 1999 storm had even higher wind speeds, but different methods and faulty equipment meant that recordings were less than in 2013.

== Forecast ==
Loop of meteorological surface map of the trajectory of Cyclone Christian from 25 to 29 October 2013

The storm was first forecast in the week before it occurred, with the Met Office supercomputer modelling the storm four days before it even formed. Initial predictions, broadcast on 24 October, were that the south coast would be affected. A later forecast was that the storm would pass over the United Kingdom on a more northerly track, affecting all areas south of the Midlands. Predictions were for 20–40 mm (0.79–1.57 in) of rain, with wind speeds of 130 km/h (80 mph) falling in a period of six to nine hours. These were later updated, with winds of Force 11 predicted.

The Met Office issued "Amber – be prepared" warnings on 24 October for the storm along the south coast of England, with a "Yellow – be aware" warning extending up to the Midlands. Warnings up to the Midlands were upgraded to amber on 25 October.

The forecast storm was widely reported in the British press on 25 October, with comparisons being made to the Great Storm of 1987 and the Burns' Day Storm of 1990. A Met Office spokeswoman said the 1990 storm, when damaging winds affected a larger area of the UK, was a better comparison than the 1987 storm, though in fact the great storm of 1987 did actually affect a similar swathe of England when matched with this storm. Later projections predicted the storm to have a severity more like storms in October 2000, January 2007, and March 2008. Forecasters in the UK latterly thought the storm would affect England in a similar manner to the storm of 27–28 October 2002. Michael Fish, who made an infamous error in forecasting the Great Storm of 1987, wrote that he felt that people should delay their journey to work because of the storm. The Met Office received praise for the accuracy of its forecast.

On 26 October, Météo-France issued orange warnings for Brittany, Normandy, coastal Picardy and Nord-Pas de Calais. Twelve departments in Northern France were placed on alert, all in the regions of Brittany, Haute Normandie and Nord-Pas-de-Calais, as well as the departments of Calvados, Loire-Atlantique, Manche and Somme.

The Royal Netherlands Meteorological Institute issued a warning of severe gusts of 75 to 100 km/h (47 to 62 mph) on Monday with gusts up to between 90 and 120 km/h (56 and 75 mph) expected in the afternoon on 28 October. In the Netherlands, four provinces were placed on alert – Utrecht, North Holland, South Holland and Zeeland. On the north-west coast of the Netherlands, winds of Force 11 were predicted.

The Danish Meteorological Institute warned of the possibility of a storm and high coastal waters for Monday afternoon, with storm-strength gusts expected. The Swedish Meteorological and Hydrological Institute warned authorities in the country that the storm could continue to the west coast of Sweden.

=== Preparation ===
Ahead of the storm, London's Metropolitan Police Service advised people to only use the 999 emergency telephone number in an emergency, and to use the 101 Single Non-Emergency Number service for reporting non-emergency situations, anticipating the emergency services being stretched by the storm's passage.

== Damage ==
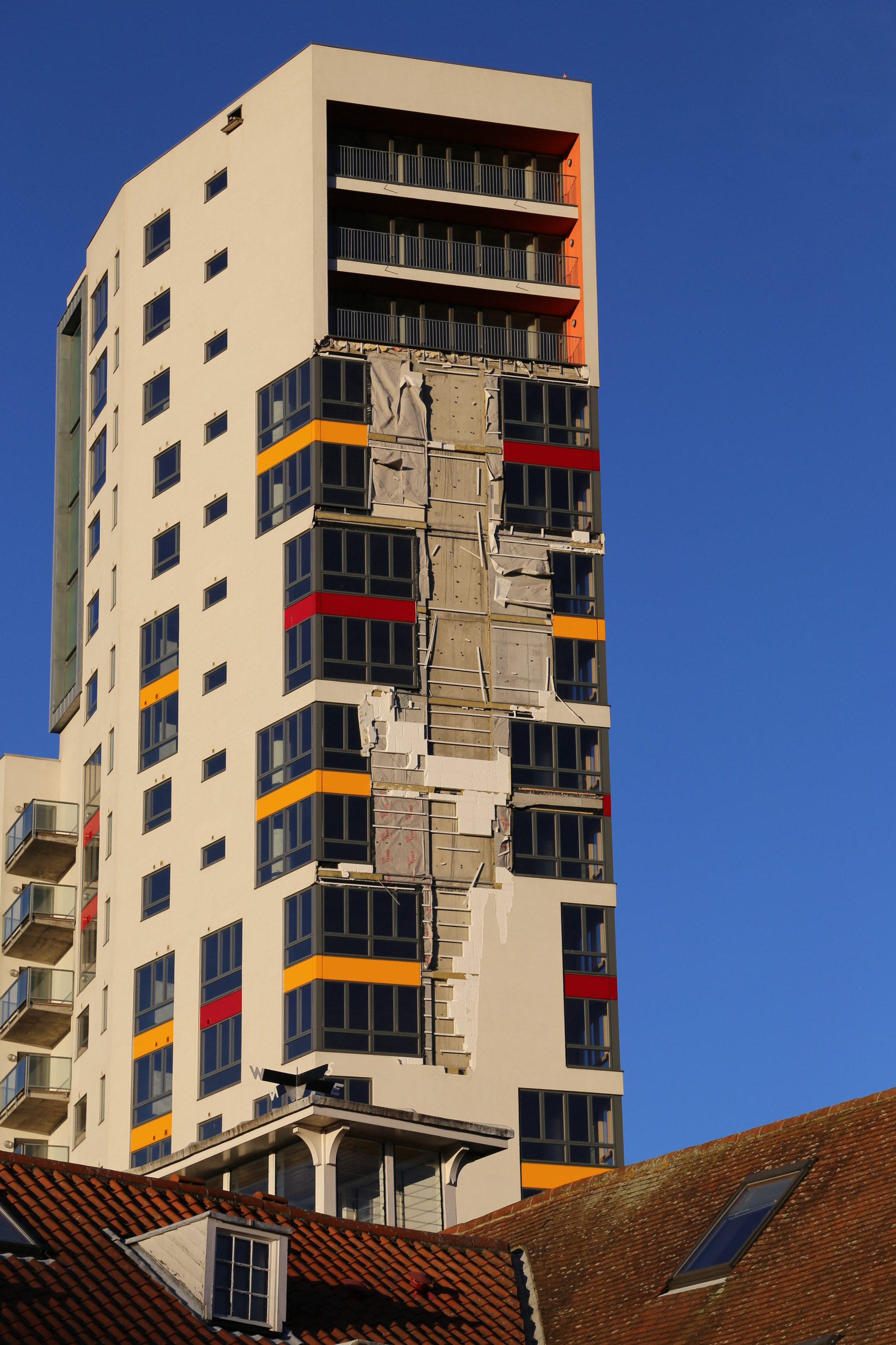
Damaged cladding on The Mill, Ipswich

=== United Kingdom ===
The worst damage was caused by trees being brought down by the wind (as many had still not yet dropped their leaves) falling onto buildings, cars and powerlines. Overall structural damage to residential and commercial buildings was limited in the United Kingdom, with most damage to roofs, cladding and glazing. Many insurance claims were expected for food in freezers which defrosted after power outages.

Some of the more notable incidents in the United Kingdom included: In Essex, the helter-skelter on Clacton Pier was blown down and the orangutan enclosure at Colchester Zoo suffered roof damage. In London, a crane collapsed on top of the Cabinet Office, closing Whitehall between Horse Guards Avenue and Parliament Square. A second crane collapsed in South East London, closing the Old Kent Road, both cranes were the same model and an investigation was subsequently launched by the manufacturer and the Health and Safety Executive. Construction sites across London were in lock-down during the storm, Francis Road in Leyton saw one-hundred-metre-long (330 ft) two storey scaffold collapse and in Mayfair's Berkeley Square another large scaffold collapsed. In Hounslow, London, two people were killed when a gas explosion destroyed three houses and damaged two after the storm blew a tree down. In Ipswich, Suffolk, the high winds ripped exterior cladding off buildings overlooking the marina, with brick walls and hoardings also being brought down leading to road closures. A double-decker bus with two passengers on board was blown over near Hadleigh, Suffolk.

=== Belgium ===
Damage in Belgium was relatively limited. Fifteen people were evacuated from their homes when scaffolding collapsed in Merksem Antwerp, damaging cars parked below. Scaffolding in Ostend was also brought down during the storm. A high sided truck loaded with chocolate was blown over on the European route E34 between Antwerp and Germany shedding its contents on the road and causing delays. Elsewhere in Flanders the coastal town of Nieuwpoort saw strong gusts damage two marquees which had been hosting the International Boat Show, despite being weighted down with large concrete blocks the damage was estimated at more than €200,000. In Brussels a large banner on the European Commission's Berlaymont building was ripped to shreds by the winds. Also in Brussels, a section of the orbital ring road was closed after road signs were brought down by high winds.

=== Netherlands ===
The record for the highest gust in the country (for the month of October) was broken three times, with a 148.2-kilometre-per-hour (92.1 mph) gust measured in Texel, North Holland, a 151-kilometre-per-hour (94 mph) gust on Vlieland, Friesland, and the strongest gust of 152 km/h (94 mph) at Lauwersoog, De Marne in Groningen. Vlieland sustained winds of Force 11 for one hour, and Force 12 winds for at least 20 minutes. Two people were killed, a woman in Amsterdam and a man in Veenendaal, while at least 25 others were injured.

Widespread damage was reported throughout the country, with thousands of trees falling down and damaging cars, gas lines, buildings, and causing disruption to transport. In Amsterdam, hundreds of trees were uprooted, destroying cars and sinking at least one houseboat on the city's canals. Roofs were blown off buildings and debris caused much of the city's tram services to come to a halt, while buses experienced heavy delays and the subway system was reportedly overcrowded. Amsterdam Centraal railway station was closed due to storm damage, and there was virtually no rail traffic in and around the city for most of the day, leaving thousands of travellers stranded. KLM cancelled 47 flights out of Schiphol airport, while many others experienced heavy delays. Municipal authorities closed most of the city's parks in addition to the Artis zoo, and several remained closed a day after the storm's passage, including the Vondelpark and Amstelpark. A photograph circulating on Twitter showed a ferris wheel in central Amsterdam that appeared to be damaged but it turned out to be a planned demolition by the owners.

Uploaded recordings of the storm in the Netherlands included a cyclist in Amsterdam narrowly escaping a falling tree at Haarlemmerplein, and video of a house roof being damaged by the high winds in Dokkum, Friesland.

The Port of Rotterdam was closed for all shipping on 28 October, while the DFDS-owned King Seaways ferry with 1,080 people on board coming from Newcastle was forced to abandon docking at IJmuiden and return to sea to wait the storm out.

On 29 October Forest Service authorities warned people not to venture into forested areas for the next few days, as many trees were weakened and together with falling branches represented a danger to people's lives. Initial damage estimates exceeded 95 million Euros and were expected to rise even further, as they only included individuals' reports and not damage done to the agricultural or public sector. More than 10,000 emergency calls were made throughout the Netherlands during the day, with Amsterdam having the highest total of 366.

=== Germany ===
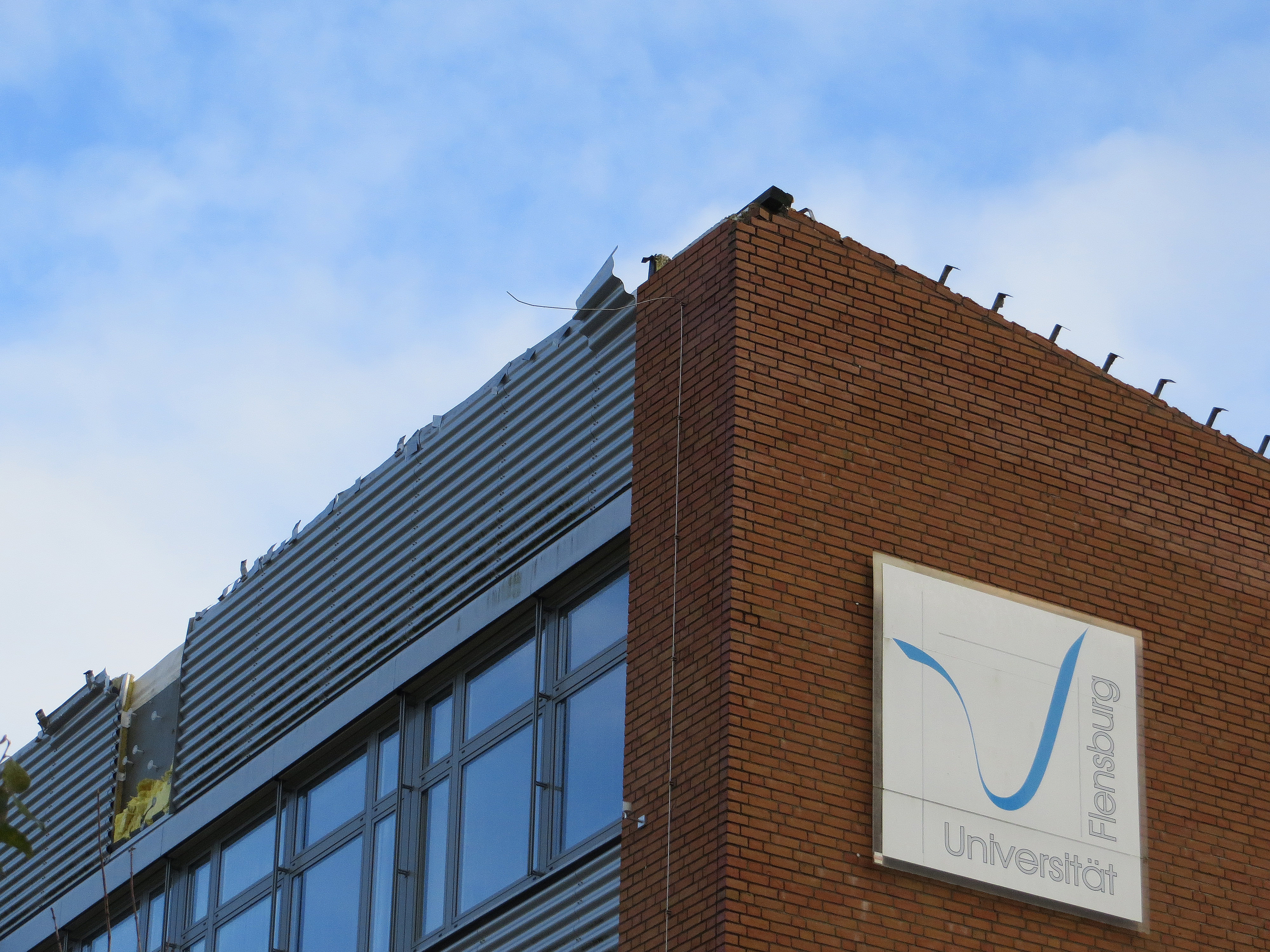
Damage to a roof at the University of Flensburg

High winds toppled many trees in north west Germany, with the strongest wind field impacting the East Frisian islands and Heligoland. Storm damages occurred principally across the states of Lower Saxony, Bremen, Hamburg and Schleswig Holstein, with lesser damages reported in North Rhine-Westphalia and Mecklenburg-Vorpommern. On the East Frisian island of Nordeney footage of a roof being blown off in the high winds was captured. At the University of Flensburg the roof was blown off a campus building onto a car park below.

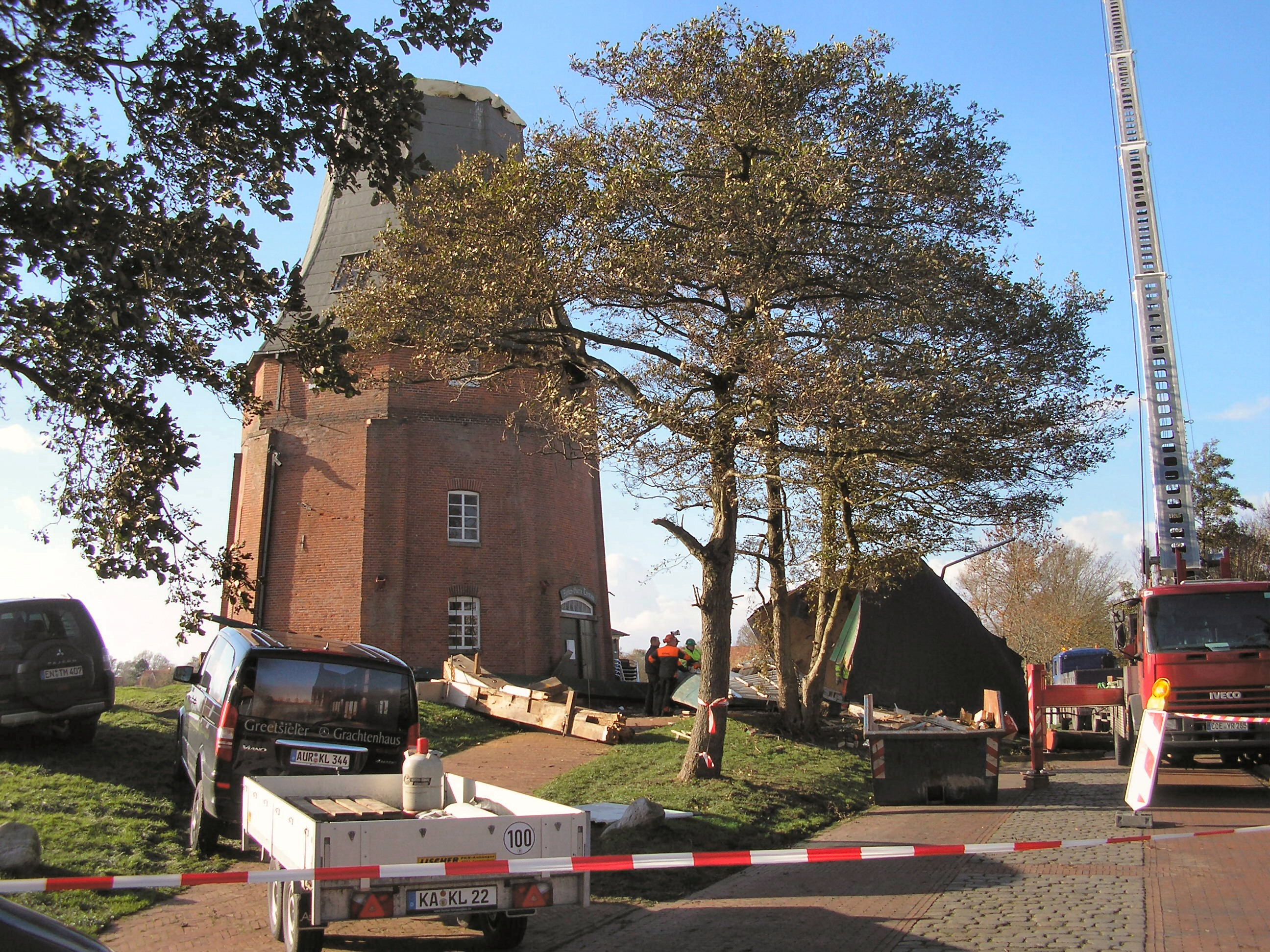
The Oost Mühle, Greetsiel. The mill's cap is on the ground at right.

The Oost Mühle windmill, in Greetsiel, Lower Saxony was tailwinded.^{[Note 1]} Its cap and sails blown off. The tailwinding was filmed.

In Göttingen, also in Lower Saxony, part of the façade of a building of the city's university was brought down by storm gusts onto empty parked cars.

=== Denmark ===
External image
- Railway damage in Denmark

In Denmark, The Lyngby railway station was damaged. Trees were blown down in almost every part of the country and car accidents were also caused by the storm. A roof in Haderslev in southern region of Denmark landed on an elderly woman. A man died after being hit by a brick from a fallen house. The day after, 29 October a man was killed after he crashed into a fallen tree on the road. In Copenhagen areas of the main shopping street Strøget, were closed by police due to the danger of falling scaffolding in the wind, also in the city a 17-storey crane was toppled in Bryggen. In Faaborg, the Åstrup Mølle windmill had two sails blown off. Train operating company DSB rail said it expected damages to total at least five million kroner, possibly up to 10 million kroner with 25 damaged trains needing to be repaired. The track and signal operator Banedanmark said 500 trees had fallen on the lines in the country and expected its damages to total between five and seven million kroner from the storm.

=== Estonia ===
The strongest wind gust of 33.2 m/s (120 km/h; 74 mph) was recorded on the Estonian island of Vilsandi on 29 October. Some 160,000 customers were without power during the storm's passage and many houses and forests were damaged.

== Disruption ==
=== Electricity supplies ===
- More than 850,000 homes lost power in the UK at some point.
- At Luton, Devon, on 27 October, a 27-metre-tall (89 ft) wind turbine was blown down.
- Both nuclear power reactors at Dungeness B were shut down due to weather-related circumstances, with operator EDF Energy expecting generation on the site to be off for seven days after power to the site was cut, and the reactors shut down safely in response.
- In France, 65,000 houses lost power in Brittany, Normandy and Picardy.
- The NorNed HVDC connector between Norway and the Netherlands was put out of action following the destruction of the converter station roof in the Netherlands, the connection was not expected to be restored until 15 November. The outage lowered Nordic energy prices as Norway's ability to export surplus electricity was reduced.
- In Denmark, around 100,000 houses lost power in Vejen, Kolding and southern Funen.
- Swedish energy companies reported that 66,000 people were without electricity at 03:00 on 29 October.
- In Finland, thousands of people were without electricity in the south and southwest, but the storm was less severe than expected, with the strongest winds passing to the south of the country through Estonia.
- In Estonia, 160,000 customers were without power during the storm's passage, with Pärnu county and Saaremaa worst hit. Latvian energy company Latvenergo lent technical assistance to Eesti Energia, helping to restore energy in the south of the country.
- In Latvia 2000 households were left without power and three towns with a population of 68,000. 1000 power line support beams were replaced in four days.
- In Russia, more than 1,500 people in the Leningrad region, about 16,000 persons in the Novgorod region and about 360 settlements in the Pskov region lost power.

=== Transport ===
==== Air ====
- In the United Kingdom, 130 flights from Heathrow Airport were cancelled in total.
- In the Netherlands, 42 KLM flights from Schiphol Airport were cancelled.
- In Denmark, Copenhagen Airport closed for all departures and arrivals for a while Monday evening, beside several delays and cancellations.
- In Germany, Hamburg Airport several flights were cancelled or were diverted to Hannover airport, about 151 km (94 mi) south of Hamburg, beside several delays and cancellations.

==== Rail ====
France

- SNCF cancelled all services to and from Gare de Lille-Flandres.

United Kingdom

- Network Rail dealt with a landslip in the New Forest area, and more than a hundred fallen trees. An empty passenger train hit a fallen tree near Ivybridge, Devon.
- East Coast warned travellers that a revised timetable would be in force. Trains south of York would run at a reduced speed.
- East Midlands Trains cancelled all services in to and out of St Pancras until 10:00 on 28 October. The Nottingham to Norwich services were also cancelled until 10:00.
- First Capital Connect announced that they did not expect to run any services before 09:00 on 28 October.
- Abellio Greater Anglia announced that they did not expect to run any services before 09:00 on 28 October.
- London Overground cancelled all trains due to depart before 09:00.
- Southern announced that it was highly unlikely to run any service before 09:00 on 28 October.
- South West Trains cancelled all trains due to depart before 08:00 of 28 October, and warned of delays as those trains running would be restricted to 50 miles per hour (80 km/h). It also warned people not to travel on 28 October and stated that a significantly reduced timetable would be operating.
- Transport for London reported that services on six Tube lines were affected on account of debris on the tracks.

International

- Eurostar cancelled all trains due to depart before 07:00 UTC, and warned of delays as those trains running would do so at a reduced speed.
- Thalys trains between Belgium and the Netherlands were diverted off the high-speed lines, leading to delays of two hours.

Belgium

- Trains in Belgium were severely delayed, with 60 percent of them arriving late. The average delay was 15 minutes, with 20 percent of trains being delayed by more than the average.

Netherlands

- HTM Personenvervoer cancelled all tram services in The Hague, South Holland, the Netherlands due to fallen trees and damage to the catenary.
- RandstadRail operated a reduced service to Zoetermeer, South Holland.
- Nederlandse Spoorwegen had suspended all traintraffic from 11:00 around Amsterdam, as later also the whole northern part of the Netherlands. During the end of the morning, as also most of the afternoon, these areas had no railway services. Two trains hit fallen trees on the railway and were heavily damaged. At many railways trees had collapsed and major delays occurred till the late hours. All trains north of Zwolle, Overijssel were suspended.
- Public transport in Amsterdam, provided by GVB Gemeentelijk Vervoerbedrijf, suspended its trams and ferries. Also many buses had major delays due to damage by the storm. Services resumed later the same evening.

Denmark

- Trains in Denmark were cancelled. Trees on the tracks was the major reason.
- The station building at Lyngby railway station was damaged as the roof of a nearby building was blown off, landing on the station. All services through the station were suspended, with the station not due to be reopened before 1 November.

Sweden

- Swedish authorities (Trafikverket) cancelled traffic on a few small lines in Sweden that are prone to be seriously affected by strong winds, the announcement being made one day in advance. On the 28th, main lines in South-West Sweden were also closed to avoid having passengers stranded out on the lines. The closure was a preemptive action.

Russia

- Tramway and trolleybus transport networks of Saint Petersburg were stopped for almost two hours.

==== Road ====
- The A249 Sheppey Crossing in Kent was closed on 27 October due to high winds. A diversion was put in place via the Kingsferry Bridge. The A282 Queen Elizabeth II Bridge at Dartford, Kent was closed.
- The M4 Second Severn Crossing was closed to traffic from 19:00 on 27 October due to high winds. The M48 Severn Bridge was also closed.
- Whitehall in London between Horse Guards Avenue and Parliament Square was closed because of a collapsed crane on the Cabinet Office.
- The Orwell Bridge on the A14 road was closed leading to severe congestion on diversionary routes for haulage through Ipswich.
- In The Hague, South Holland, the Netherlands, bus services were suspended on 28 October.
- In Denmark four bridges, Great Belt Bridge, New Little Belt Bridge, Vejle Fjord Bridge and Alssund Bridge, were closed including the Oresund Bridge between Denmark and Sweden.

==== Sea ====
- In the Atlantic Ocean, the container ship Maersk Salina lost 45 containers whilst off the coast of Brittany, France.
- Irish Ferries cancelled services between Holyhead, Anglesey and Dublin.
- Sailings between Penzance and the Isles of Scilly, operated by the Isles of Scilly Steamship Co.'s Scillonian III, were cancelled.
- The Fal River ferry in Cornwall was suspended.
- In France, Penn-ar-Bed cancelled its sailings between Ouessant, Finistère and the Île de Sein.
- Brittany Ferries cancelled a number of sailings on 27 October. The 16:30 from Roscoff, Finistère, France to Plymouth, Devon and the 23:00 from Plymouth to Roscoff.
- Condor Ferries cancelled its sailings on the Poole–Weymouth–Channel Islands route and also those between Saint-Malo and the Channel Islands.
- The Port of Dover was closed between 06:00 and 09:30 on 28 October; two P&O ferries with a total of 463 passengers on board were held at sea in The Downs, off Deal, Kent.
- In the Netherlands, ferries between Harlingen, Friesland and Vlieland were cancelled.
- In the North Sea, the container ship YM Unicorn lost two containers off Terschelling, Friesland, Netherlands.
- In Germany, ferry services to Heligoland and Sylt were cancelled on 27 and 28 October.
- Mols Line cancelled four sailings between Jutland and Sjællands Odde.
- In the Baltic Sea, a Stena Line passenger ferry with 33 staff on board was driven by high winds to ground: the Stena Alegra anchored outside the Swedish port of Karlskrona. The 89-metre-long (292 ft) bulk carrier R:tterdam's anchor was uprooted, but managed to weigh anchor again.
- One hundred people were evacuated from the Siri oil platform in the North Sea.
- Ferry services between Rønne on Bornholm and Ystad were also cancelled.

== Casualties ==
Country	Fatalities	Missing
Germany	8	0
United Kingdom	4	1
Netherlands	3	0
Denmark	3	0
France	1	0
Total	19	1

=== France ===
A woman of 47 was swept into the sea from Belle Île, an island off the coast of Brittany. Her dead body was found the next morning.

=== United Kingdom ===
At Newhaven, East Sussex, a 14-year-old boy was swept out to sea on 27 October. The search for him, involving the Newhaven Lifeboat David and Elizabeth Acland and a Coastguard helicopter, was called off at 21:45 on 27 October. A man died in Watford, Hertfordshire when a tree fell on his car. In Hever, Kent, a 17-year-old girl died after the storm blew a tree onto the static caravan in which she was living. In Hounslow, London, two people were killed when a gas explosion destroyed three houses and damaged two after the storm blew a tree down.

=== Netherlands ===
In Amsterdam, a woman died after a tree fell on her at the Herengracht. A tree that fell on a taxi severely injured the male passenger inside. A 22-year-old man was severely injured in Veenendaal when he was struck by a tree branch, and he died later in the hospital.

=== Germany ===
In Cologne, a sailor died on 27 October when his boat capsized. A fisherman died in a separate incident. On 28 October, two people, a mother and child, were killed in Gelsenkirchen when an uprooted tree fell on their car. A Flensburg newspaper reported the death of a German male in Flensburg, hit by a falling tree. The German media claimed at least 8 dead.

=== Denmark ===
A 21-year-old man who was taking pictures in Gilleleje near Copenhagen was killed by flying tiles. A man was found dead in his car in Holbæk after his car had crashed into a fallen tree.

== Highest wind gust per country ==
Country	Gust	Location
United Kingdom	182 km/h	Redcar
Ireland	168 km/h	Wexford
France	176 km/h	Boulogne-sur-Mer
Belgium	146 km/h	Knokke-Heist
Netherlands	152 km/h	Lauwersoog & Vlieland
Germany	173 km/h	Sankt Peter-Ording
Luxembourg	122 km/h	Wincrange
Denmark	194 km/h	Als
Norway	177 km/h	Verdens Ende
Sweden	180 km/h	Vadstena and Karlsborg
Åland	176 km/h	Mariehamn
Finland	166 km/h	Kimitoön
Estonia	120 km/h	Vilsandi

== Aftermath ==
=== Insurance industry ===
The track of the St. Jude storm across Europe took it over densely populated areas of southern England and the Netherlands, impacting on its route the major cities of London, the Dutch Randstad, Hamburg and Copenhagen, which could indicate a high level of insured exposure.

Immediately following the passage of the storm in the United Kingdom, a surge of calls to insurance groups led to companies drafting in additional staff to handle claims and assess damage. Many of the larger insurers also found that their share price fell as investors feared the potential financial costs the storm could bring to the companies, although the Financial Times reported that shares in UK insurers were trading at a level broadly similar to the wider market during the morning of 28 October.

Willis Re estimated the total costs to the insurance industry of the storm were likely to range between £300 million and £500 million in the UK on 29 October 2013. The executive director said the damage was comparable to windstorm Kyrill, which struck in 2007 and according to data from the Association of British Insurers would have incurred costs of £370 million in 2013. In an update released on 4 November Willis Re stated they expected losses to be lower than their initial estimates in the UK, and estimated Europe-wide losses to be between €800m and €1.3bn (£677m and £1.1bn). The catastrophe modelling company AIR Worldwide estimated on 7 November that they expected European losses to be higher at between 1.5 and 2.3 Euros.

Perils AG, the independent reporting agency established to aggregate and provide the insurance industry with catastrophe insurance data, launched an investigation into the storm. The initial estimate of damages from the storm were published on 6 December at €994 million, later updated to €1,068 million on 27 January 2014. The third estimate of €1,091 million was released on 28 April 2014.

=== Electricity supplies ===
In the United Kingdom 3,110 homes were still without power on 1 November mostly in the east of England, with Suffolk being the worst-hit area of the country. UK Power Networks said the storm caused extensive damage to overhead power lines, forcing it to draft in more than 1,000 specialist engineers. By the afternoon of 1 November only 100 homes were without power. National Grid estimated that two gigawatts (2000 MW) of wind power generation was lost during 24 hours as the St. Jude storm passed over the UK (turbines shut down during very high winds as a safety precaution), generation by fuel type during the storm was 10.5 percent wind, 40 percent coal and 23 percent gas fired, which a spokesman said was typical for a windy day. UK Power Networks the Distribution network operator in the East of England, London and parts of South East England paid 13,000 eligible customers compensation totalling £1,134,000 as a result of power outages lasting longer than 48 hours due to the storm.

In Estonia the tabloid Õhtuleht was critical of the government owned Eesti Energia following the storm damage to the countries' electricity infrastructure. The newspaper questioned if the company was investing enough in the domestic power grid, especially in rural areas. The director of Elektrilevi, the power distribution subsidiary of Eesti Energia announced that 80 percent of Estonia would be covered by a weatherproof grid by 2025.

=== Cultural references ===
Florence Welch wrote a song about the personal struggles she was experiencing around the time the storm hit Britain. She said that she felt as if a huge storm were following her, both physically and mentally.

== Notes ==
1. When a windmill is tailwinded, the wind is blowing from the rear of the mill. A fantail cannot turn the cap to face into wind, and the cap may be lifted and/or blown off.
