= Cyclone Egon =

2017 European windstorm

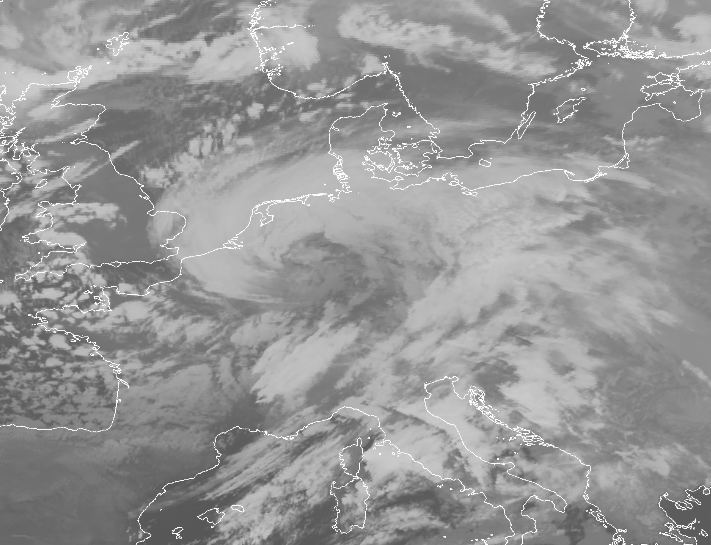
- Cyclone Egon on January 13

Meteorological history
- Formed: January 12, 2017
- Dissipated: January 13, 2017

European windstorm
- Lowest pressure: 982 mbar (982 hPa)

Overall effects
- Fatalities: 3 total
- Damage: €275 million
- Areas affected: France, Germany, Belgium, Netherlands, Luxembourg, Switzerland, Austria.

Cyclone Egon was a European windstorm that affected the north of France, Belgium and Germany during the night of Thursday 12 to Friday 13 January 2017. It caused three deaths, widespread power outages, and wind damage and significant snowfall, primarily France and Germany, but also in the Benelux states, Austria and Switzerland.

The storm was the first to exceed the reporting threshold of €200 million with Perils.org since Cyclone Niklas in March 2015. The total insured damages were estimated at €275m (final loss report).

== Meteorological history ==
Synoptic chart of development of Egon, south of Ireland and path over France and Germany.

On 12 January Egon developed unexpectedly from the trailing cold front of the low Dieter centred over Scandinavia. Egon formed to the southwest of Ireland reaching western France by noon that day. Egon formed “rather unexpectedly" as a secondary low on a cold front of Windstorm Dieter, before the depression began to deepen quite quickly as it headed for northern France. The development of Egon coincided with a drop in the height of the tropopause especially between Brittany, Belgium and northeastern Germany. In more than 12 hours, the central pressure of the low pressure dropped to 980 hPa in France on 12 January. Satellite water vapour imagery of the low was described as being suggestive of a Sting jet.

== Impact ==
The highest gust reported in France was in Dieppe which reported 146 km/h (91 mph), a value not seen there since the Great storm of 1987. In Caen a gust of 131 km/h (81 mph) was reported, the strongest since the passage of Lothar in 1999. Despite locally strong gusts, Egon was not considered by Météo-France to be one of the strongest historical storms to hit France as a whole, describing it as not comparable to the storm Lothar of 1999.

Egon was accompanied by heavy rain and snow in places, with the regions of Normandy and Picardy particularly affected, where Egon caused power outages for over 330,000 households concentrated in these regions.

Strong winds from Egon pushed in a significant portion of the west rose window of Soissons Cathedral to the northeast of Paris. Debris from the window landed on the organ causing severe damage.

A unit of the Paluel Nuclear Power Plant, near Dieppe shut down automatically following the malfunction of a 400,000 volt transmission cable. Severe gusts and heavy snowfall caused considerable damage and disruption in northern France and central Germany. Some of the greatest damage was incurred to forestry.

In Germany, hurricane-force winds blew on the Saar and Rhineland-Palatinate, uprooting trees and causing power outages. Heavy snowfall covered much of the country and closed the roads, while the German Meteorological Service (DWD) indicated that some areas had received up to 30 cm (12 in) in a few hours, causing accidents. The airports of Frankfurt, Leipzig and Dresden cancelled their flights. A driver died in an accident, probably because of slippery roads, in Schleswig-Holstein. Another driver was also killed in an accident in Hesse.

On 13 January in Kaiserslautern the winds of Egon brought down the scaffolding surrounding a high-rise. Hurricane-force gusts from the low Egon swept through the Saarland on 13 January up to 126 km/h (78 mph).
