= Conditional symmetric instability =

Weather radar loop showing intense snow bands (lighter color) due to CSI ahead of a warm front.

Conditional symmetric instability, or CSI, is a form of convective instability in a fluid subject to temperature differences in a uniform rotation frame of reference while it is thermally stable in the vertical and dynamically in the horizontal (inertial stability). The instability in this case develops only in an inclined plane with respect to the two axes mentioned and that is why it can give rise to a so-called "slantwise convection" if the air parcel is almost saturated and moved laterally and vertically in a CSI area. This concept is mainly used in meteorology to explain the mesoscale formation of intense precipitation bands in an otherwise stable region, such as in front of a warm front. The same phenomenon is also applicable to oceanography.

== Principle ==
=== Hydrostatic stability ===
Environmental temperature (in red) and dew point (in green) on a Skew-T log-P diagram.

An air particle at a certain altitude will be stable if its adiabatically modified temperature during an ascent is equal to or cooler than the environment. Similarly, it is stable if its temperature is equal or warmer during a descent. In the case where the temperature is equal, the particle will remain at the new altitude, while in the other cases, it will return to its initial level.

In the diagram on the right, the black line represents a raised particle whose temperature remains at first under that of the environment (stable air) which entails no convection. Then in the animation, the surface is heated by solar radiation and the raised particle remains warmer than the environment (unstable air). A measure of hydrostatic stability is to record the variation with the vertical of the equivalent potential temperature ($\theta_e$):

- If $\theta_e$ diminish with altitude leads to unstable airmass
- If $\theta_e$ remains the same with altitude leads to neutral airmass
- If $\theta_e$ increase with altitude leads to stable airmass.

=== Inertial stability ===
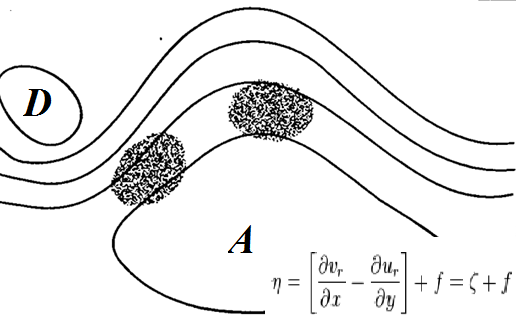
Dark zones are regions of weak inertial stability in atmospheric circulation.

In the same way, a lateral displacement of an air particle changes its absolute vorticity $\eta$. This is given by the sum of the planetary vorticity, $f$, and $\zeta$, the geostrophic (or relative) vorticity of the parcel:

$\eta= \left[ \frac{\partial v}{\partial x} - \frac{\partial u}{\partial y} \right ] + f = \zeta + f \qquad \qquad$

Where :

- $v$ and $u$ are the meridional and zonal geostrophic velocities respectively.
- $x$ and $y$ correspond to the zonal and meridional coordinates.
- $f$ is the Coriolis parameter, which describes the component of vorticity around the local vertical that results from the rotation of the reference frame.
- $\zeta$ is the relative vorticity around the local vertical. It is found by taking the vertical component of the curl of the geostrophic velocity.

$\eta$ can be positive, null or negative depending on the conditions in which the move is made. As the absolute vortex is almost always positive on the synoptic scale, one can consider that the atmosphere is generally stable for lateral movement. Inertial stability is low only when $\eta$ is close to zero. Since $f$ is always positive, $\eta \le 0$ can be satisfied only on the anticyclonic side of a strong maximum of jet stream or in a barometric ridge at altitude, where the derivative velocities in the direction of displacement in the equation give a significant negative value.

The variation of the angular momentum indicate the stability:

- $\Delta M_g = 0$, the particle then remains at the new position because its momentum has not changed
- $\Delta M_g > 0$, the particle returns to its original position because its momentum is greater than that of the environment
- $\Delta M_g < 0$, the particle continues its displacement because its momentum is smaller than that of the environment.

=== Slantwise movement ===
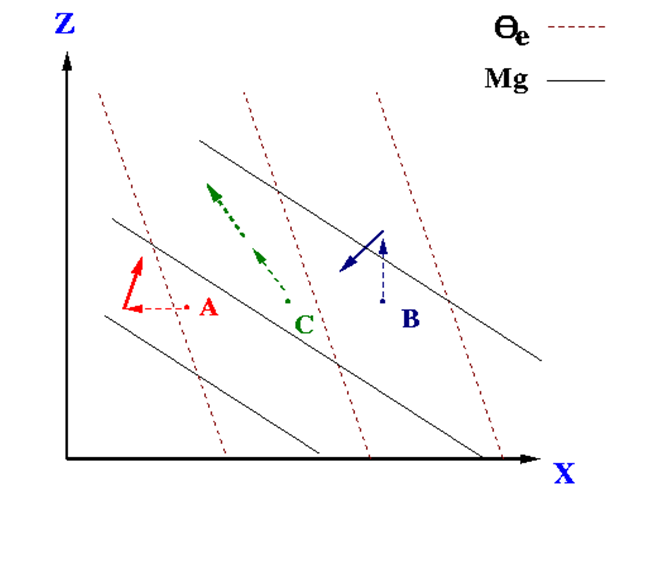
Three motions but only C is convectively instable.

Under certain stable hydrostatic and inertial conditions, slantwise displacement may, however, be unstable when the particle changes air mass or wind regime. The figure on the right shows such a situation. The displacement of the air particle is done with respect to kinetic moment lines ($\scriptstyle M_g$) that increase from left to right and equivalent potential temperature ($\scriptstyle \theta_e$) that increase with height.

Lateral movement A

Horizontal accelerations (to the left or right of a surface $\scriptstyle M_g$) are due to an increase/decrease in the $\scriptstyle M_g$ of the environment in which the particle moves. In these cases, the particle accelerates or slows down to adjust to its new environment. Particle A undergoes a horizontal acceleration that gives it positive buoyancy as it moves to colder air and decelerates as it moves to a region of smaller $\scriptstyle M_g$. The particle rises and eventually becomes colder than its new environment. At this point, it has negative buoyancy and begins to descend. In doing so, $\scriptstyle M_g$ increases and the particle returns to its original position.

Vertical displacement B

Vertical movements in this case result in negative buoyancy as the particle encounters warmer air ($\scriptstyle \theta_e$ increases with height) and horizontal acceleration as it moves to larger surfaces $\scriptstyle M_g$. As the particle goes down, its $\scriptstyle M_g$ decreases to fit the environment and the particle returns to B.

Slantwise displacement C

Only case C is unstable. Horizontal acceleration combines with a vertical upward disturbance and allows oblique displacement. Indeed, the $\scriptstyle \theta_e$ of the particle is larger than the $\scriptstyle \theta_e$ of the environment. While the momentum of the particle is less than that of the environment. An oblique displacement thus produces a positive buoyancy and an acceleration in the oblique displacement direction which reinforces it.

The condition for having conditional symmetric instability in an otherwise stable situation is therefore that:

- the slope of $\scriptstyle \theta_e$ is greater than that of $\scriptstyle M_g$
- Laterally displaced air is almost saturated.

== Potential effects ==
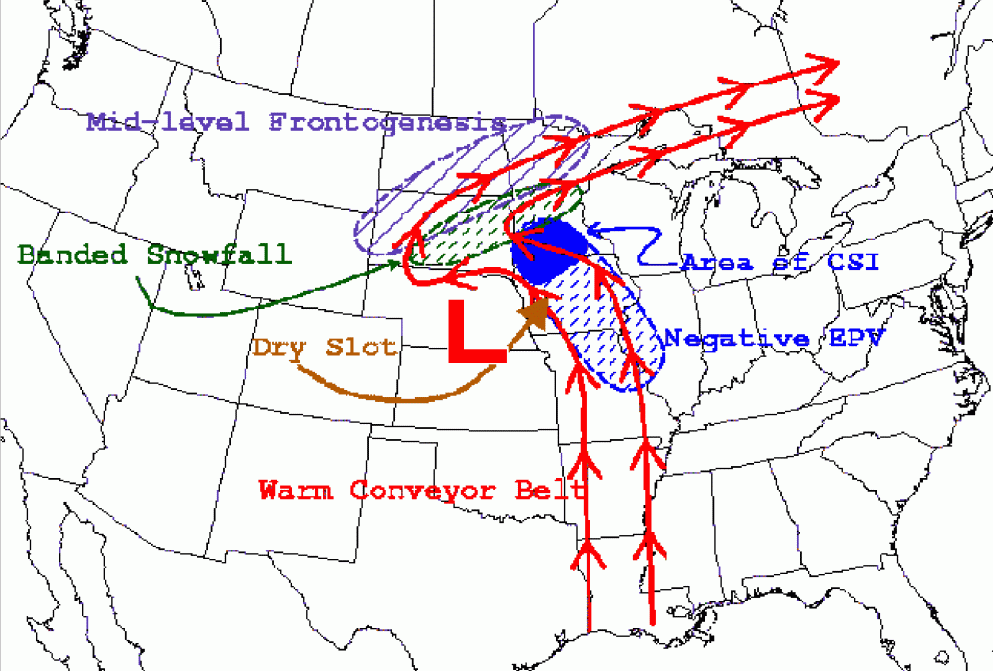
Zones of CSI (solid blue) and banded snow (dash green) along the warm front, near the low pressure area.

CSI is usually embedded in large areas of vertical upward motion. The ideal situation is a geostrophic flow from the South with wind speeds that increase with height. The environment is well mixed and close to saturation. Since the flow is unidirectional, the u component of the wind can be set equal to zero, which establishes a symmetrical flow perpendicular to the temperature gradient in the air mass. This type of flow is typically found in baroclinic atmospheres with cold air to the west.

The image to the right shows such a situation in winter with CSI associated with negative equivalent potential vorticity ($\eta \le 0$) near a warm front. Banded snow forms along the front, near the low pressure area and the CSI.

=== Slantwise convection ===
Upward movement in an area of CSI gives clouds, downward movement clears the sky.

If a particle is climbing in a CSI zone, it will cool down and the water vapor will condense upon saturation, giving cloud and precipitation by oblique convection. For example, in front of a warm front, the air mass is stable because the mild air overcomes a cold mass. The geostrophic equilibrium brings back any particle moving perpendicularly from the center of the depression towards it. However, an upwardly oblique displacement by synoptic scale upward acceleration in a CSI layer produces parallel bands of heavy rainfall.

Conditional symmetric instability affects a layer that can be thin or very large in the vertical, similar to hydrostatic convection. The thickness of the layer determines the enhancement of convective precipitation within a region otherwise stratiform clouds. As the motion is in an area near saturation, the particle remains very close to the moist adiabatic lapse rate which gives it a limited Convective available potential energy (CAPE). The rate of climb in a slantwise convection zone ranges from a few tens of centimeters per second to a few meters per second. This is usually below the climbing speed limit in a cumulonimbus, i.e. 5 m/s, which gives lightning and limit the occurrence of it with CSI. It is however possible in:

- The trailing precipitation region of mesoscale convective systems.
- Wintertime convection because the lower and colder tropopause is helping the ionization of upward moving ice crystals.
- In the eyewall during the deepening phase of mature hurricanes, although rarely as it is a region symmetrically neutral and is generally free of lightning activity.

Slantwise convection bands have several characteristics:

1. They are parallel
2. They are parallel to the thermal wind
3. They move with the general circulation
4. The space between the bands is proportional to the thickness of the CSI layer

=== Subsidence ===
Conversely, if the particle slide downward, it will warm up and become relatively less saturated, dissipating clouds. The snow produced at higher altitude by the slantwise convection will also sublimate in the descending flow and accelerate. It can give it a speed of descent reaching the 20 m/s. This effect is associated with the descent to the ground of the Sting jet.
