= Cyclone Jeanett =

2002 European windstorm

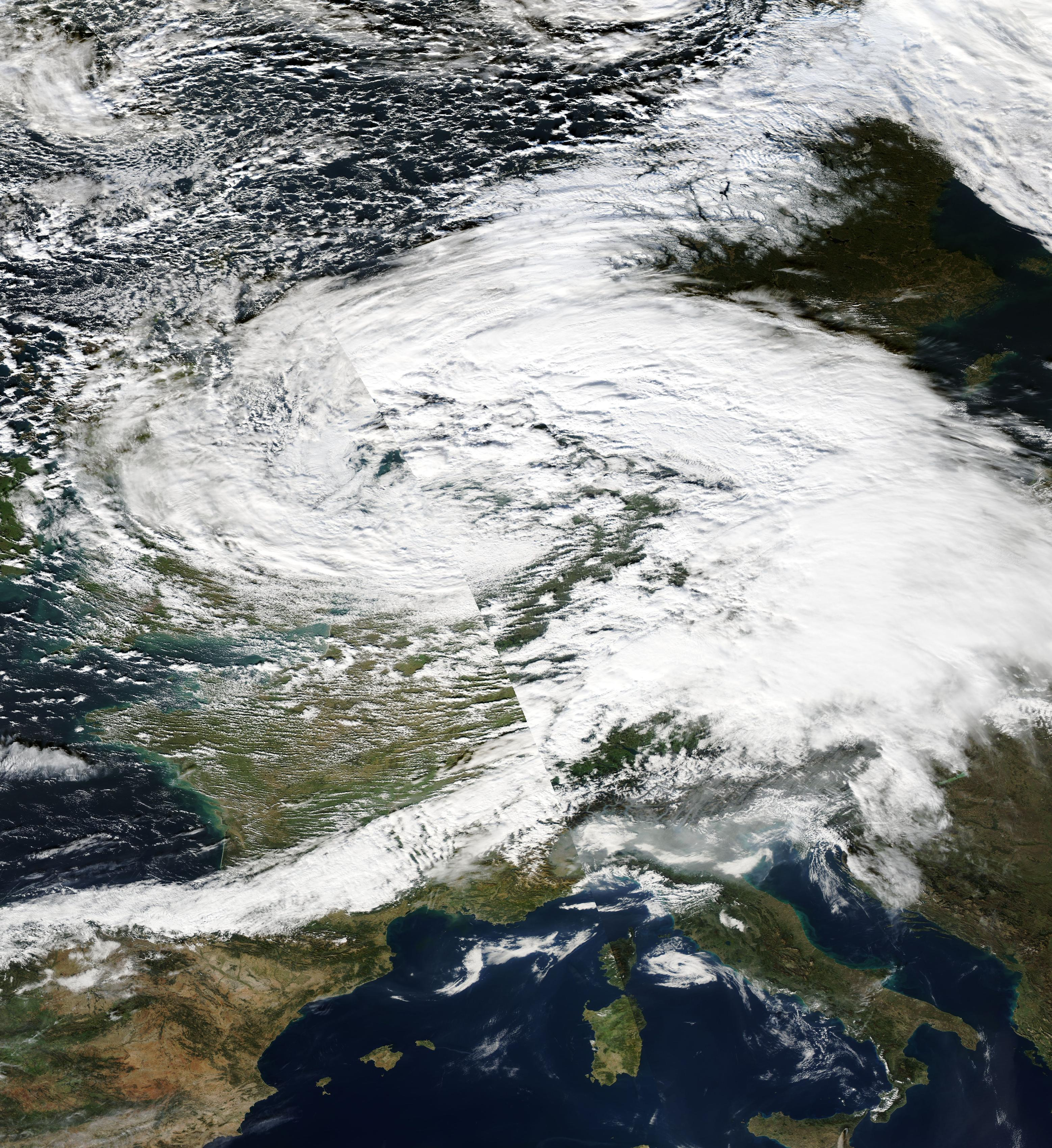
- Jeanett over western Europe, 27 October 2002

Meteorological history
- Formed: 25 October 2002
- Dissipated: 31 October 2002

European windstorm Extratropical cyclone
- Highest gusts: 153 km/h (95 mph; 83 kn).
- Lowest pressure: 975 mb (28.8 inHg) 973 KNMI

Overall effects
- Fatalities: 33
- Areas affected: Western Europe

Cyclone Jeanett (also written as Jeanette) was a strong extratropical cyclone and European windstorm which affected much of northwest Europe on 27–28 October 2002. The storm brought strong winds and heavy rainfall, with wind speeds reaching up to 180 km/h (110 mph; 97 kn) uprooting trees, smashing cars and damaging buildings. The storm was responsible for a total of 33 deaths across Europe, including Britain, the Netherlands, France, Austria, Belgium, Denmark, Poland, Switzerland and Sweden. The majority of the fatalities were caused by falling trees.

In the United Kingdom, wind gusts between 95 and 130 km/h (59 and 81 mph; 51 and 70 kn) were recorded with a gust of 96 mph (84 kn) reported at Mumbles South Wales. In terms of wind speed, it was the biggest storm in the United Kingdom since Cyclone Oratia in October 2000, with the Royal Netherlands Meteorological Institute (KNMI) describing it as the most severe storm since the Burns' Day storm of 1990.

== Meteorological history ==
Jeanett formed in the Atlantic to the south of Newfoundland following behind the path of an earlier low, Irina on 25 October. The low did not explosively deepen, but saw two phases of deepening first on 25 October, with a second deepening phase while crossing the UK 27 October. The low rapidly moved across the North Atlantic, passing over Northern Ireland early in the morning 27 October, before crossing over northern England and the North Sea to lie over the Southern Baltic Sea close to the Swedish island of Gotland 24 hours later. Jeanett developed features of a sting jet as it crossed Britain. Jeanett was preceded by a period of high winds on 12–14 October.

== Impact ==
Strong winds of over 110 km/h (70 mph; 61 kn) were experienced inland, and in coastal regions winds of over 140 km/h (90 mph; 78 kn) were reported. The strong winds were accompanied by heavy rainfall, with subsequent flooding resulting in several evacuations. Flood warnings were issued for across much of Scotland, and northern and eastern parts of England. The highest gust was reported at the exposed coastal location of The Needles at 165 km/h (102 mph; 89 kn), Return periods of winds experienced were around 10–15 years in the London area for both the highest mean hourly winds and maximum gust speeds. East Anglia also saw return periods of around 10–15 years for highest mean winds and between 5–15 years for maximum gust speeds.

The worst wind related damage was experienced across Wales, the English Midlands and into the Netherlands and onto western Germany. At least 33 people were killed across Europe, with seven fatalities in the United Kingdom. Flights from all the London and Midlands airports were cancelled with many railway services also cancelled as a result of a combination of downed trees and debris on the lines, and damage to overhead power lines. The passenger ferry Pride of Portsmouth collided with HMS St Albans in Portsmouth Harbour as the ship was buffeted while turning across the winds.

In the Netherlands, the storm left four people dead. Amsterdam's Schiphol airport was closed, and damage was caused to Amsterdam Centraal railway station. The strong winds caused damage from Frankfurt to Hamburg in Germany, where there were eleven fatalities as a result of the storm. Rail services across Germany were severely disrupted as well as flights, and fallen trees were widespread. The German state of North Rhine-Westphalia was particularly affected with half the deaths reported here. In the state the World Heritage Site of Cologne Cathedral was damaged by the high winds. The German insurance company Allianz estimated that it would pay out around €80 million (US$78 million). According to reports four fatalities occurred in France and a further two in Belgium in storm related incidents.

== Aftermath ==
The storm resulted in over 30 deaths, many of which were the result of falling trees. Significant damage to property occurred over a wide area, but the most significant effect of the storm was the problems resulting for communications and transport networks throughout Europe. In the UK, the gales brought down power lines, leaving 300,000 homes without electricity in the UK alone. Transportation of all kinds was affected in the UK, France, Germany, Austria and The Netherlands. Damaged power lines and tracks blocked by falling trees affected rail services throughout Europe, while on the roads, commuters faced long delays.

The Eurostar service between London and the continent was halted due to a technical problem, as salt from the sea picked up by the wind was deposited on the isolators that connect the trains to the power cables. The conductive salt left trains unable to operate until after a thorough cleaning operation had been completed after the storm's passage. In the far north, a ferry carrying 80 passengers was stranded for 80 hours after it failed to land at Lerwick in the Shetland Isles. Heathrow airport saw over 60 flights cancelled on 27 October.

Jeanett's winds gusted up to 160 km/h (100 mph; 87 kn), causing widespread damage to the electricity distribution network in England and Wales. Up to two million customers were affected by loss of electricity supply at some point because of the storms, with supplies in East Anglia, South West England and West Wales being particularly disrupted. Most customers were reconnected within 18 hours, but the Department of Trade and Industry estimated that nearly 10,000 customers were still without power on 1 November. Supplies were not fully restored in the worst affected area, served by EDF Energy's subsidiary company 24seven, until Tuesday 5 November, 10 days later.

The catastrophe risk modeling firm EQECAT estimated the insured loss for "Jeanette" to be in excess of €1 billion. The most severe losses were expected in the United Kingdom, Germany and The Netherlands, with further substantial losses in the UK, France, Austria, Poland, Czech Republic and Slovakia. Total economic losses from the storm were estimated to be twice this figure. Damage caused by the stormy weather in the United Kingdom was estimated to cost up to £50 million (US$75 million), according to the Association of British Insurers. The British Insurance Brokers’ Association (BIBA) estimated that claims could reach £200 million ($300 million).

When compared to other autumn storms affecting southern England during the previous 40 years, the Jeanett storm ranks first when looking at the number of weather stations which recorded a wind gust over 110 km/h (69 mph; 60 kn).
