= Autumn 2000 Western Europe floods =

Natural disaster in Europe

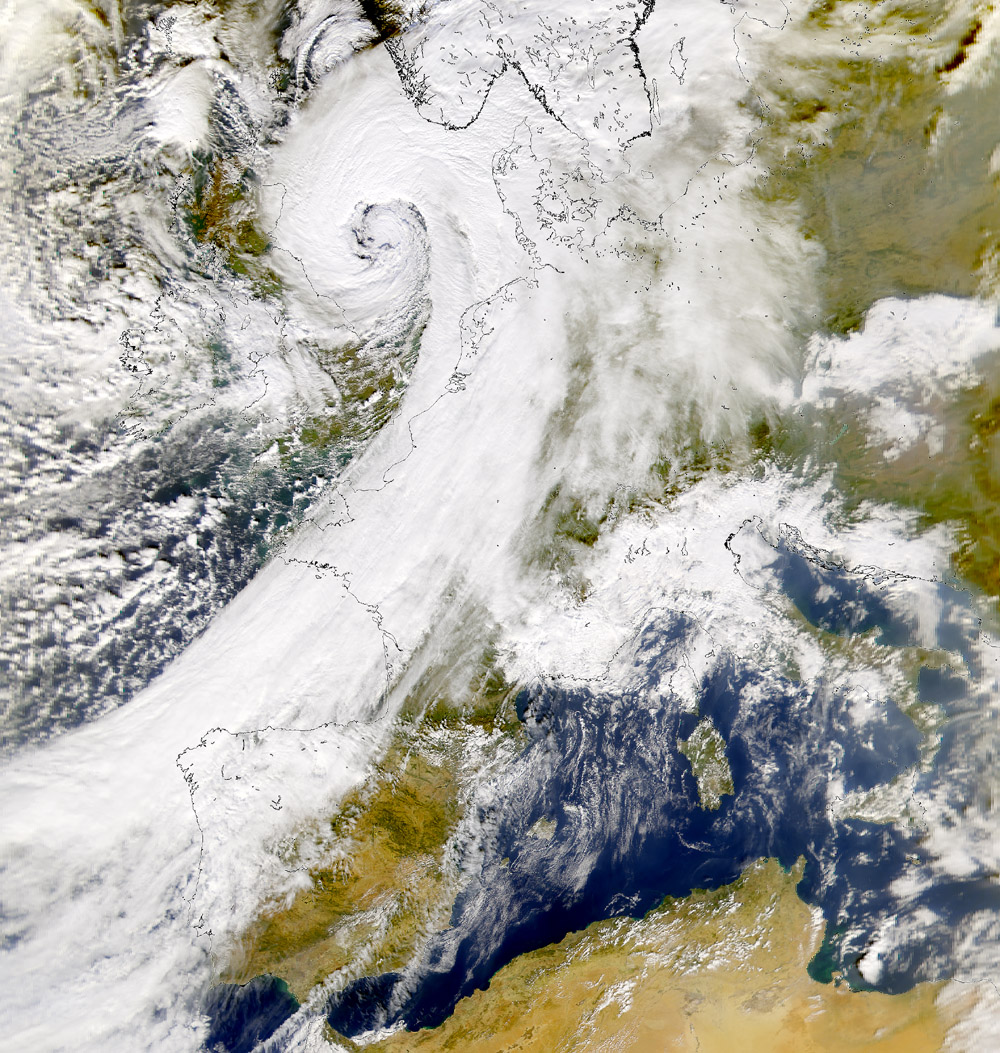
- Cyclone Oratia over Western Europe on October 30, 2000
- Date: mid-September 2000 – mid-December 2000
- Location: United Kingdom, Italy, France, Switzerland, Spain, Netherlands, Ireland, Denmark, Norway, Slovenia
- Deaths: 20
- Property damage: Estimated to exceed $2 billion

The autumn of 2000 was the wettest recorded in the United Kingdom since records began in 1766. Several regions of Atlantic Europe from France to Norway received double their average rainfall and there were severe floods and landslides in the southern Alps. In October and November 2000 a successive series of extratropical cyclones caused severe flooding across the UK.

The United Kingdom saw the most extensive nationwide flooding event since the snow-melt of 1947. Prior to 1947, three similar events occurred in the second half of the 19th century where prolonged rainfall led to widespread flooding throughout England in the month of November, namely 1894, 1875, and 1852.

The combined effect of the storms across Western Europe caused flooding throughout the United Kingdom. Two storm events (Nicole and Oratia) 28 October to 3 November, and the storm Rebekka from 4 November, resulted in continuous flooding. 10,000 homes were flooded in 700 locations. Peak flows on the Rivers Thames, Trent, Severn, Wharfe and Dee were the highest for 60 years. The River Ouse in Yorkshire reached the highest level since the 17th century.

In the United Kingdom a series of severe floods affected large parts of the country in the autumn of 2000. The worst affected areas were Kent and Sussex during October and Shropshire, Worcestershire and Yorkshire in November. The autumn of 2000 was the wettest on record in the England and Wales precipitation record with several major rainfall events causing flooding in different parts of the country during October and November. England and Wales had an average of 503 mm of rain from September–November exceeding the previous record by nearly 50 mm.

== Meteorological background ==
A succession of slow-moving low pressure systems crossed the UK during autumn 2000 associated with the jet stream being in a more southerly position than average. The flooding in Kent and Sussex resulted from a succession of thunderstorms passing along a near-stationary front. Much of the rock in this area is impermeable and there had already been significant rainfall in the south-east allowing for increased surface flow and river levels. Several fronts passed over central and northern England in the following weeks causing flooding in Shropshire, Worcestershire and Yorkshire.

=== Prelude ===
The rainfall for this period in the three preceding years had been above the 1961-1990 average. The previous spring was unsettled, with April and May particularly wet, which increased the aquifer recharge season. Heavy rain was also seen in June, leading to high river levels and some flooding in Yorkshire.

September 2000 was generally unsettled, with wet periods between 14 and 19. This resulted in some flooding on 15 September around Portsmouth and Southsea as a pumping station at Eastney failed after 58 mm (2.3 in) of rain fell in 4.5 hours, being the heaviest rain since 1986 in the area. Total rainfall was also measured at 65mm in Havant making this a 1 in 108 year storm event. Storms affected Flanders in Belgium 15 September, with tornados reported in the municipalities of Zwalm, Antwerp and Erpe-Mere. Flooding affected the regions of Ghent and Kortrijk. 24 out of 27 UK Met Office regions except northern Scotland received higher than normal rainfall during the month, making this the wettest September since 1981.

=== Ex-Hurricane Isaac, 2–4 October ===
Ex-Hurricane Isaac crossed the Atlantic with eye still visible on 2 October and lashed the west of the British isles with near gale-force winds on 3 October, before merging with another extra-tropical low on 4 October towards the north of Scotland. Early October 2000 brought more than the monthly average rainfall in the first 10 days to the southeast of England.

=== Ex-Tropical Storm Leslie, 9–14 October ===
Ex-TS Leslie (Imke/Heidrun)
Meteorological history
- Formed: 7 October 2000
- Dissipated: 14 October 2000

Winter storm
- Lowest pressure: 963 mb (28.4 inHg)

Overall effects
- Areas affected: Western Europe

A complex of low pressures, named Heidrun & Imke by FU Berlin formed from the remnants of Tropical Storm Leslie. This formed at 30˚N 76˚W on 5 October, swept westwards and merged with a front on 7 October, and then reintensified to become a storm south of Great Britain with winds of 40-50 knots reported in the Bay of Biscay. An area of convective storms stalled over Sussex and Kent.

- 9 October: two complex low pressure systems brought more fronts and 25-40mm of rain over Sussex
- 10 October: a Low developed over Scotland, with gales and heavy showers over Sussex bringing 10-15mm of rain
- 11 October: the Low over Scotland became stuck, with a new Low arriving over Central England, producing gales over the whole UK and 15-30mm of rain over Sussex.
- 12 October: the Low drew moist air from the Bay of Biscay over Southern England where a line of heavy, localised thundery showers formed. They tracked northwest over Sussex, bringing 150mm of rain overnight to Uckfield. Only 5-10mm fell in some other areas.

== Affected areas ==
=== Kent ===
Homes in Yalding and Maidstone were flooded, however there had been fears that a high tide might lead to the River Medway bursting its banks. This threat passed preventing much more widespread damage. Evacuations took place in some villages in the county.

=== Sussex ===
On 12 October many roads were flooded across both West and East Sussex including the A21 and A22. A lifeboat crew rescued 20 people trapped in a supermarket in Uckfield and others were rescued by helicopter.

=== Shropshire ===
Shrewsbury, Ironbridge and Bridgnorth flooded as the Severn breached its banks and reached its highest levels in 53 years.

=== Worcestershire ===
The Severn breached its banks in many parts of the county, including at Bewdley, Worcester and Upton-upon-Severn. In Worcester, the Severn peaked on 3 November at its highest level in 53 years. The river remained in flood for several days however and the main road bridge in the city was closed. Homes were flooded in Diglis as well as many businesses on the city's waterfront and the cricket ground. In Bewdley, the floods led to renewed calls for flood defences in the town. These were completed in 2006 and have since reduced the impact of flooding on the town.

=== Yorkshire ===
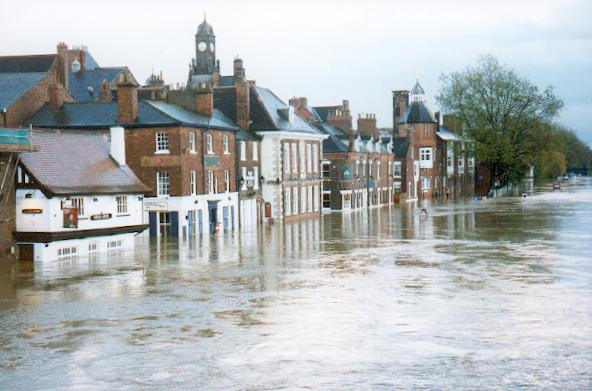
The Ouse in flood, York

Flooding affected York during the summer and autumn of 2000 as the River Ouse reached its highest levels since records began. The floods cost the city council in excess of £1 million and 40 people had to be moved from their homes. The floods were the worst in 375 years; more than 300 homes were flooded and the army were called in to help with flood relief efforts.

== Aftermath ==
Warm sea surface temperatures in the English Channel and Norway, along with an abnormally warm North Atlantic, added moisture and energy to weather systems as they crossed the UK. September was the wettest since 1981, October the wettest since 1903 and November the wettest since 1970. Overall the autumn of 2000 was the wettest since 1872, and more rain fell in September, October and November than in any other 3-month period since rainfall records began in 1727.

=== Government report ===
Defra commissioned an independent review by the Institution of Civil Engineers under George Fleming. The review was to consider methods of estimating and reducing flood risk and look at whether flood risk management could make more use of natural processes. The resulting report entitled Learning to Live with Rivers specifically criticised a reluctance to use computer models and inadequate representation of the dynamic effects of land use, catchment processes and climatic variability. More broadly, the report noted that sustainable flood risk management could only be achieved by working with the natural response of the river basin and by providing the necessary storage, flow reduction and discharge capacity. It concluded that floods can only be managed, not prevented, and the community must learn to live with rivers.

The report found that damage was reduced by flood defences and by timely warnings and evacuations where the defences could not hold back the water. As a result, 280,000 properties were protected from the floods, but over 10,000 properties were still flooded at an estimated cost of £1 billion.
