= Cyclone Oratia =

2000 European windstorm

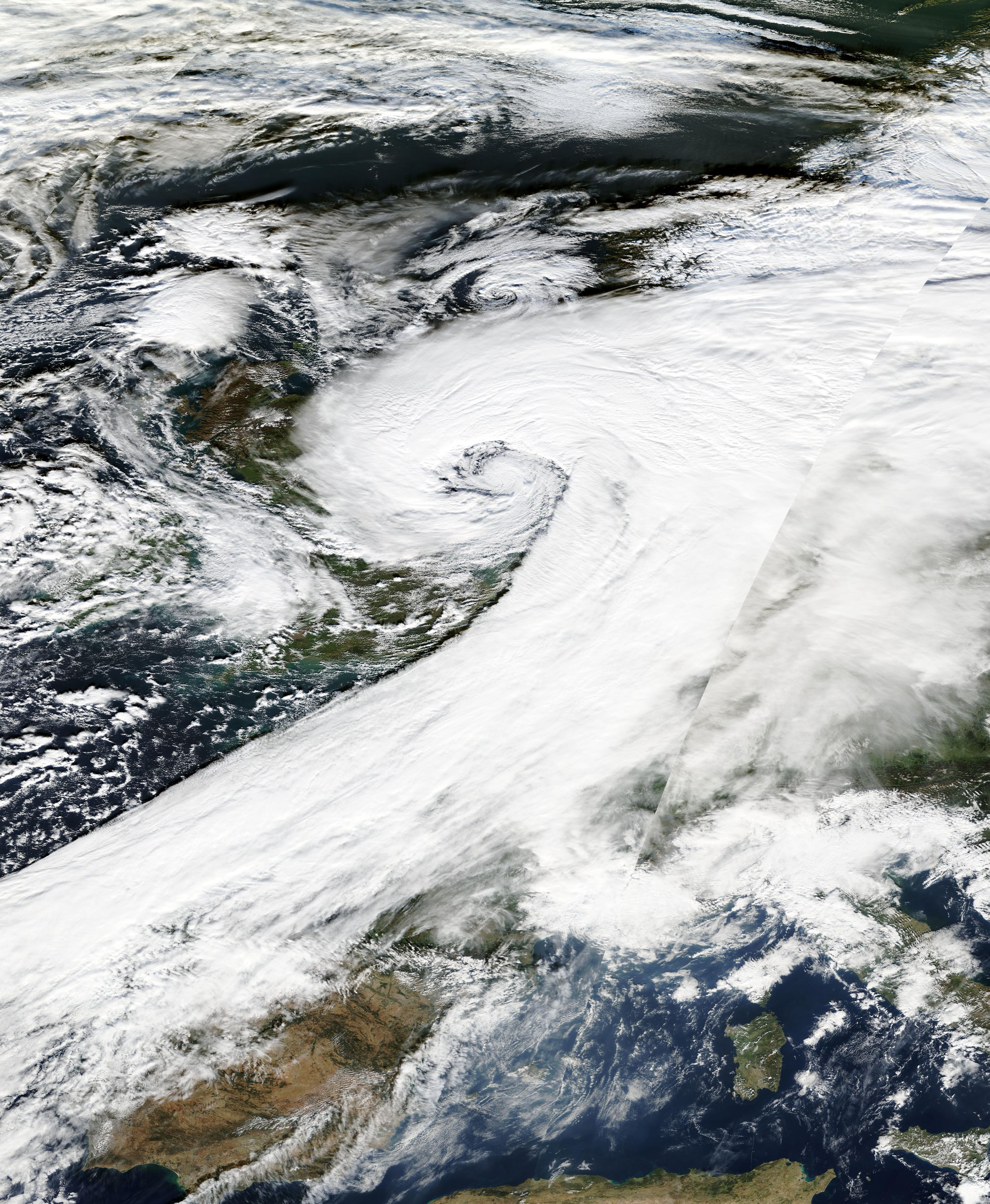
- Oratia on 30 October 2000

Meteorological history
- Formed: 28 October 2000
- Dissipated: 3 November 2000

European windstorm Extratropical cyclone
- Highest gusts: 176 km/h (109 mph) in Camaret-sur-Mer, France
- Lowest pressure: 941 mb (27.8 inHg)

Overall effects
- Fatalities: 16
- Areas affected: Western Europe

Cyclone Oratia, (Tora in Norway) was an unusually deep European windstorm which affected Western Europe from 28 to 30 October 2000. The storm was the fiercest to hit Britain in October since the Great Storm of 1987, with wind gusts reaching 109 mph (175 km/h), and gusting at up to 70 mph (110 km/h) over much of the south of England. Its barometric pressure fell to 941 hPa (27.8 inHg), over the North Sea making it one of the deepest lows recorded in the country in October. The lowest land-based pressure observation reached 951.2 hPa (28.09 inHg) at RAF Fylingdales. The storm contributed to the Autumn 2000 Western Europe floods.

== Meteorological history ==
On 26 October 2000, a deep low pressure centre anchored between Greenland and Iceland, trailing a cold front across the North Atlantic Ocean which spawned three strong storms. Cyclone Oratia developed in the Atlantic to the southwest of Ireland on 28 October 2000 during a strong 240 km/h (150 mph) upper-level jet. The low explosively deepened, with a 53 mb (1.6 inHg) drop in pressure in 18 hours preceding 18:00 UTC on 30 October 2000. The centre of the low pressure passed south of Ireland, undergoing frontal fracture according to the Shapiro-Keyser model of cyclone development, and continued across North Wales and Northern England on a line approximately from Aberystwyth–Manchester–Teesside. The cyclone developed complex mesoscale features such as a sting jet, convective rainbands and inertial gravity waves. Strong winds affected areas on both sides of the English Channel with the worst winds since 1987. The storm produced sustained hurricane-force winds across the North Sea. Oratia began to fill as it approached Norway and was eventually absorbed by another cyclone.

== Impact ==
=== France ===
The French regions principally affected were Brittany, Vendée, Cotentin, Île-de-France, Alsace, and Cambrésis. The passage of the storm left three fatalities. A 30-year-old man was killed as his truck was crushed by a falling tree, a shop owner had a fatal fall while repairing a roof, and a motorist in Normandy succumbed. 7,000 were left without power. Flights from Paris-Orly and Paris-Charles de Gaulle Airport were affected. In Lille trees were uprooted and scaffolding collapsed.

Prior to the storm, a Cypriot freighter with engine damage off the port of Antifer in Seine-Maritime, was towed to Le Havre. A small oil tanker with eight crew was also ailing on Sunday morning near Boulogne, its tanks were empty and there was no risk of oil spill. The Italian Tanker Ievoli Sun ran into trouble in the English Channel during the storm, the crew was evacuated after water intake at the bow, which filled the forward storage area and the bow thruster bay. The ship later sank approximatively 9 nautical miles (17 km) off Casquets in the English Channel, with a 6,000-tonne (6,600-short-ton) load, including 4,000 t (4,400 short tons) of styrene, 1,000 t (1,100 short tons) of trichlorosilane and 1,000 t (1,100 short tons) of isopropyl alcohol, while under tow. This sparked fears that a leak could cause an environmental problem, a year after the tanker MV Erika caused a severe oil slick off the coast of France.

=== Netherlands and Germany ===
MS Flottbek, a Columbian ship flying under Antiguan flag en route from Antwerp to Rotterdam, beached near Zoutelande on Zeeland during force 9 gales on 29 October 2000. The ship was carrying the chemicals phenol and lutensol. Four tugs failed initially to re-float it. Oratia was described by the Royal Netherlands Meteorological Institute as the 35th worst storm since 1910. Five people were injured after lightning caused a fire on an intercity train from Den Helder to Nijmegen half a kilometre from Utrecht Centraal railway station. The Police advised against using roads on the afternoon of 30 October 2000. At several places were trees on the road, with a jetty and many fences tumbling. Roofs, or parts thereof blew away, and also bus shelters. During the passage of Oratia's cold front on 30 October 2000, a harbour Seiche was observed in Rotterdam harbour with a period of 1.5 hours.

In Germany winds up to 150 km/h (93 mph) were recorded at the Brocken in Lower Saxony, where a man was seriously injured. In Oldenburg, near gale-force winds resulted in two traffic accidents in which a man was seriously injured. In Brunswick, cars were damaged by falling trees. According to the head of the Weser-Ems-crisis center in Oldenburg, police arrived on highway 31 between Riepe and Leer in East Frisia to find heavy gusts had blown a truck off the road. Relatively little damage was caused, estimated at 5,000 marks. On the coast at Hörnum on Sylt, a rescue cruiser was on alert. At Bremen Airport, the roof of a new building with an area of 100 square meters threatened to collapse. The forests of the mountains remained largely unscathed by the storm. In all forest districts of the Harz, only a few trees were knocked over in the high altitudes. In other mountain forest regions of southern Lower Saxony, such as the Brunswick wald and the Weser Uplands no significant damage was reported. Only isolated trees were knocked down. The German Weather Service announced the autumnal bad weather in Germany would subside by Tuesday, 31 October 2000.
