= Keith Browning =

British meteorologist

- Born: 31 July 1938 (age 88)
- Education: Imperial College London (B.S., Ph.D.)
- Known for: Supercell, sting jet, and other conceptual meteorological work
- Awards: Carl-Gustaf Rossby Research Medal; The Chree Medal and Prize (1981); Symons Gold Medal (2000)
- Scientific career
- Fields: Meteorology
- Workplaces: Air Force Cambridge Research Laboratories, Met Office, University of Reading

Keith Anthony Browning (born 31 July 1938) is a British meteorologist who worked at Imperial College London, the Met Office, and the University of Reading departments of meteorology. His work with Frank Ludlam on the supercell thunderstorm at Wokingham, UK in 1962 was the first detailed study of such a storm. His research covered many areas of mesoscale meteorology including developing the theory of the sting jet. Arguably his greatest talent is his intuitive understanding of complex three-dimensional meteorological processes which he has described more simply using conceptual models.

He was elected a Fellow of the Royal Society in 1978. He was president of the Royal Meteorological Society from 1988 to 1990.

In 1992, Browning was elected a member of the National Academy of Engineering for fundamental contributions to the detection and understanding of storms, and the development of operational storm-detection and warning systems.
