= Great storm of 1987 =

Severe October 1987 storm in Western Europe

Great Storm of 1987
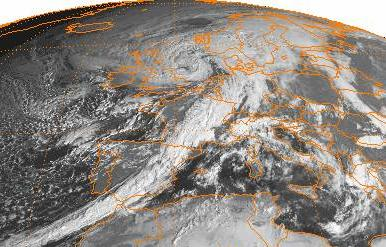
- The storm at peak intensity over the North Sea

Meteorological history
- Formed: 15 October 1987
- Dissipated: 16 October 1987

Extratropical cyclone
- Highest winds: 86 mph (139 km/h)
- Highest gusts: 134 mph (216 km/h)
- Lowest pressure: 951-953 hPa (mbar); 28.08–28.14 inHg

Overall effects
- Fatalities: 22
- Damage: £2 billion (5.785 today), 23 billion francs (8.013 billion euro today)
- Areas affected: England, France, Spain, Belgium, Norway
- Part of the 1987–1988 European windstorm season

The Great Storm of 1987 was a violent extratropical cyclone that occurred on the night of 15–16 October, with hurricane-force winds causing casualties in England, France, and the Channel Islands as a severe depression in the Bay of Biscay moved north east. Among the most damaged areas were Greater London, Kent, the East Anglian coast, the Home Counties, the west of Brittany, and the Cotentin Peninsula of Normandy, all of which weathered gusts with a return period of 1 in 200 years.

Forests, parks, roads, and railways were strewn with fallen trees and schools were closed. The British National Grid suffered heavy damage, leaving thousands without power. At least 22 people were killed in England and France. The highest measured gust of 135 miles per hour; 217 kilometres per hour (117 kn) was recorded at Pointe Du Roc, Granville, France and the highest gust recorded in the UK was 115mph at Shoreham-by-Sea, West Sussex. The storm has been termed a weather bomb due to its rapid development.

That day's weather reports had failed to indicate a storm of such severity, with an earlier, somewhat more accurate forecast having been negated by later projections. The apparent suggestion by the BBC's Michael Fish of a false alarm has been celebrated as a classic gaffe, although he claims he was misquoted. As a result of this storm, major improvements were later implemented in atmospheric observation, relevant computer models, and the training of forecasters.

== Development ==
The storm path on 15 and 16 of October.

On the Sunday before the storm struck, the farmers' forecast had predicted bad weather on the following Thursday or Friday, 15–16 October. By midweek, however, guidance from weather prediction models was somewhat equivocal. Instead of stormy weather over a considerable part of the UK, the models suggested that severe weather would reach no farther north than the English Channel and coastal parts of southern England.

During the afternoon of 15 October, winds were very light over most parts of the UK. The pressure gradient was slack. A depression was drifting slowly northwards over the North Sea off eastern Scotland. A trough lay over England, Wales, and Ireland. Over the Bay of Biscay, a depression was developing.

=== First warnings ===
The first gale warnings for sea areas in the English Channel were issued at 0630 UTC on 15 October and were followed, four hours later, by warnings of severe gales. At 1200 UTC on 15 October, the depression, which originated in the Bay of Biscay, was centred near 46° N, 9° W and its depth was 970 hPa (29 inHg). By 1800 UTC, it had moved north-east to about 47° N, 6° W, and deepened to 964 hPa (28.5 inHg).

At 2235 UTC, winds of Force 10 were forecast. By midnight, the depression was over the western English Channel, and its central pressure was 953 hPa (28.1 inHg). At 0140 on 16 October, warnings of Force 11 were issued. The depression now moved rapidly north-east, filling a little as it did, reaching the Humber Estuary at about 0530 UTC, by which time its central pressure was 959 hectopascals (28.3 inHg). Dramatic increases in temperature were associated with the passage of the storm's warm front.

In some sea areas, warnings of severe weather were both timely and adequate, although forecasts for land areas left much to be desired. During the evening of 15 October, radio and TV forecasts mentioned strong winds, but indicated that heavy rain would be the main feature, rather than wind. By the time most people went to bed, exceptionally strong winds had not been mentioned in national radio and TV weather broadcasts.

Warnings of severe weather had been issued, however, to various agencies and emergency authorities, including the London Fire Brigade. Perhaps the most important warning was issued by the Met Office to the Ministry of Defence (MoD) at 0135 UTC, 16 October. It warned that the anticipated consequences of the storm were such that civil authorities might need to call on assistance from the military.

=== Winds ===
Storm path and the loop showing the highest winds corridor. (1 m/s = 3,6 km/h)

A highest gust of 220 km/h; 137 mph (119 kn) is estimated from satellite data at Quimper, Brittany, with the highest measured gust at 217 km/h; 135 mph (117 kn) at Pointe du Roc, Granville, Normandy.

In south east England, where the greatest damage occurred, gusts of 130 km/h; 81 mph (70 kn) or more were recorded continually for three or four consecutive hours. During this time, the wind veered from southerly to south-westerly. To the north west of this region, there were two maxima in gust speeds, separated by a period of lower wind speeds. During the first period, the wind direction was southerly. During the latter, it was south-westerly. Damage patterns in south east England suggested that tornadoes accompanied the storm.

In the UK, winds at Shoreham-by-Sea, West Sussex reached 190 km/h; 120 mph (100 kn) before the anemometer failed. Many anemometers were reliant on mains power, and ceased recording as the south east of the United Kingdom was blacked-out by power cuts, thus losing much valuable data. Winds with an estimated 200-year return period hit the counties of Kent, Sussex, Berkshire, Hampshire, and along the coastal strip of Essex, Suffolk, and south east Norfolk. North of a line from Portland Bill, Dorset to Cromer, Norfolk the return period of the respective gusts were under 10 years.

Sustained winds speeds greater than 121 km/h (75 mph) were recorded for over an hour in southern Britain. According to the Beaufort scale of wind intensities, this storm had winds of hurricane force 12 (117 km/h [73 mph] or greater); as the term hurricane refers to tropical cyclones originating in the North Atlantic or North Pacific, the descriptor "great storm" has tended to be reserved for those storms in recent years reaching this velocity. Hurricanes have a very different wind profile and distribution from storms, and significantly higher precipitation levels.

== Impact ==
=== England ===
The storm made landfall in Cornwall, and tracked north-east towards Devon and then over the Midlands, going out to sea via The Wash. The strongest gusts, of up to 100 knots (190 km/h; 120 mph), were recorded along the south eastern edge of the storm, hitting mainly Berkshire, Hampshire, Sussex, Essex, and Kent. The Royal Sovereign lighthouse 6 miles (9.7 km) off Eastbourne recorded the highest hourly-mean wind speed in the UK on its instruments at 75 kn (139 km/h; 86 mph). The counties of Dorset and Surrey were also heavily affected.

The storm caused substantial damage over much of England, felling an estimated 15 million trees, including six of the seven eponymous oaks in Sevenoaks, historic specimens in Kew Gardens, Wakehurst Place, Nymans Garden, Hyde Park in London, and Scotney Castle and most of the trees making up Chanctonbury Ring. At Bedgebury National Pinetum, Kent almost a quarter of the trees were brought down. There have been many claims that the damage to forestry was made worse by broadleaf trees still being in leaf at the time of the storm, though this was not borne out by an analysis by the Forestry Commission.

Fallen trees blocked roads and railways, and left widespread structural damage primarily to windows and roofs. More than 5,000 trees fell on railway tracks in the Southern Region, and the Midland and West Coast Main Lines were blocked. Beach huts were blown onto tracks at Leigh-on-Sea. The roofs and canopies at Limehouse and Benfleet stations were destroyed, and £300,000 of damage was caused to construction work on a new train ferry pier at Dover Western Docks station.

Several hundred thousand people were left without power, not fully restored until more than two weeks later. Local electric utility officials later said they lost more wires in the storm than in the preceding decade. At sea, as well as many small boats being wrecked, a Sealink cross-channel ferry, the MV Hengist, was driven ashore at Folkestone and the bulk carrier MV Sumnea capsized at Dover, Kent. The Radio Caroline ship MV Ross Revenge survived as one of the few ships to be in the North Sea during the storm; it being a radio ship, it also provided radio broadcasts to thousands while most stations were offline.

The National Grid sustained heavy damage during the event, as crashing cables short-circuited, which in some cases overheated the main system. Its headquarters faced the choice of keeping the grid online to help London as the storm approached but risk an incremental system breakdown, failure and burnout, or to shut down most of south east England including London and avert that risk. The headquarters made the decision, the first one like it since before World War II: to shut down the south east power systems to maintain the network as soon as signs of overheating began.

At Clayton, West Sussex, one of the village's recently restored windmills, Jill, sustained severe damage to its mechanisms and caught fire during the storm. The mill's brakes had been applied prior to the storm's arrival, but the high winds were able to rotate the sails and overcome the brakes, creating friction which set the mill's antique timbers on fire. Members of the Jack and Jill Windmills Society were able to put the fire out, carrying water up the hill to douse the flames.

In London, many of the trees lining streets, particularly plane trees, were blown down overnight, blocking roads and crushing parked cars. Building construction scaffolding and billboards collapsed in many places, and many buildings were damaged. The following morning, the BBC's current affairs production centre at Lime Grove Studios in Shepherd's Bush, was unable to function due to a power failure – TV-am's Good Morning Britain and BBC1's Breakfast Time programmes were broadcast from different emergency facilities in emergency formats. TV-am broadcast from Thames Television's Euston Road studios, while BBC newsreader Nicholas Witchell had to use the BBC1 continuity studio at BBC Television Centre, with the wall decorations used for Children's BBC hastily taken down. Much of the public transport in the capital was not functioning, and people were advised against trying to go to work. Good Morning Britain host Anne Diamond did go back to the regular TV-am studio with reporter Kay Burley, whilst Richard Keys remained in the Thames Television studio in case the power supply situation became even worse, and indeed, power did go back down at around 8:15 am.

Eighteen people lost their lives as a result of the storm.

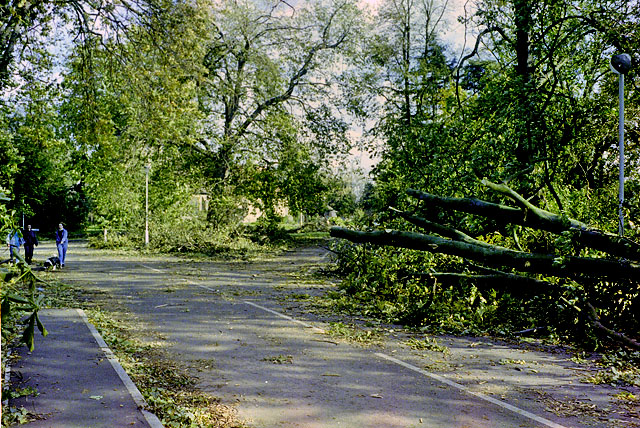
Partially cleared storm damage, Chelmsford

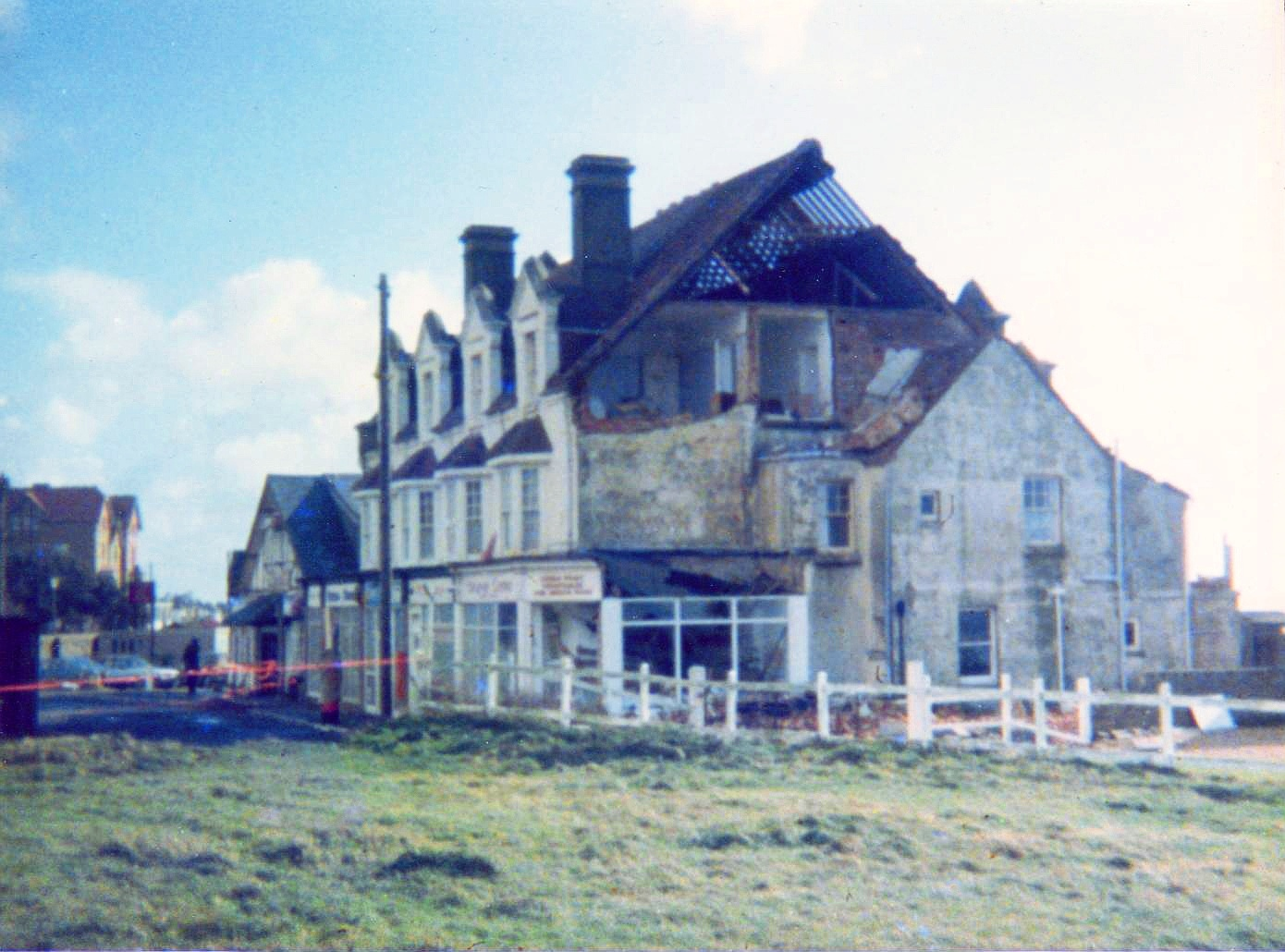
Storm-damaged building, Barton on Sea in Hampshire

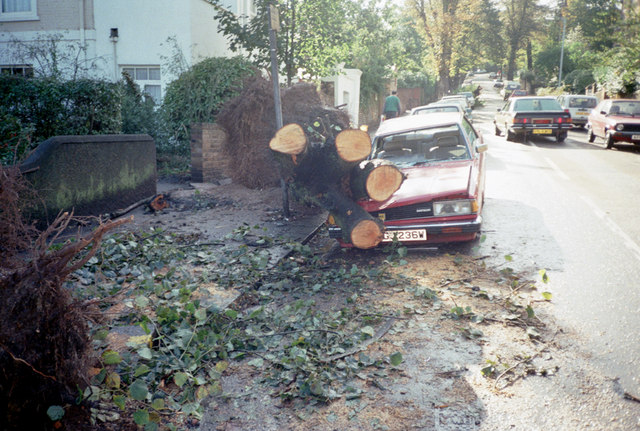
Storm damage in London

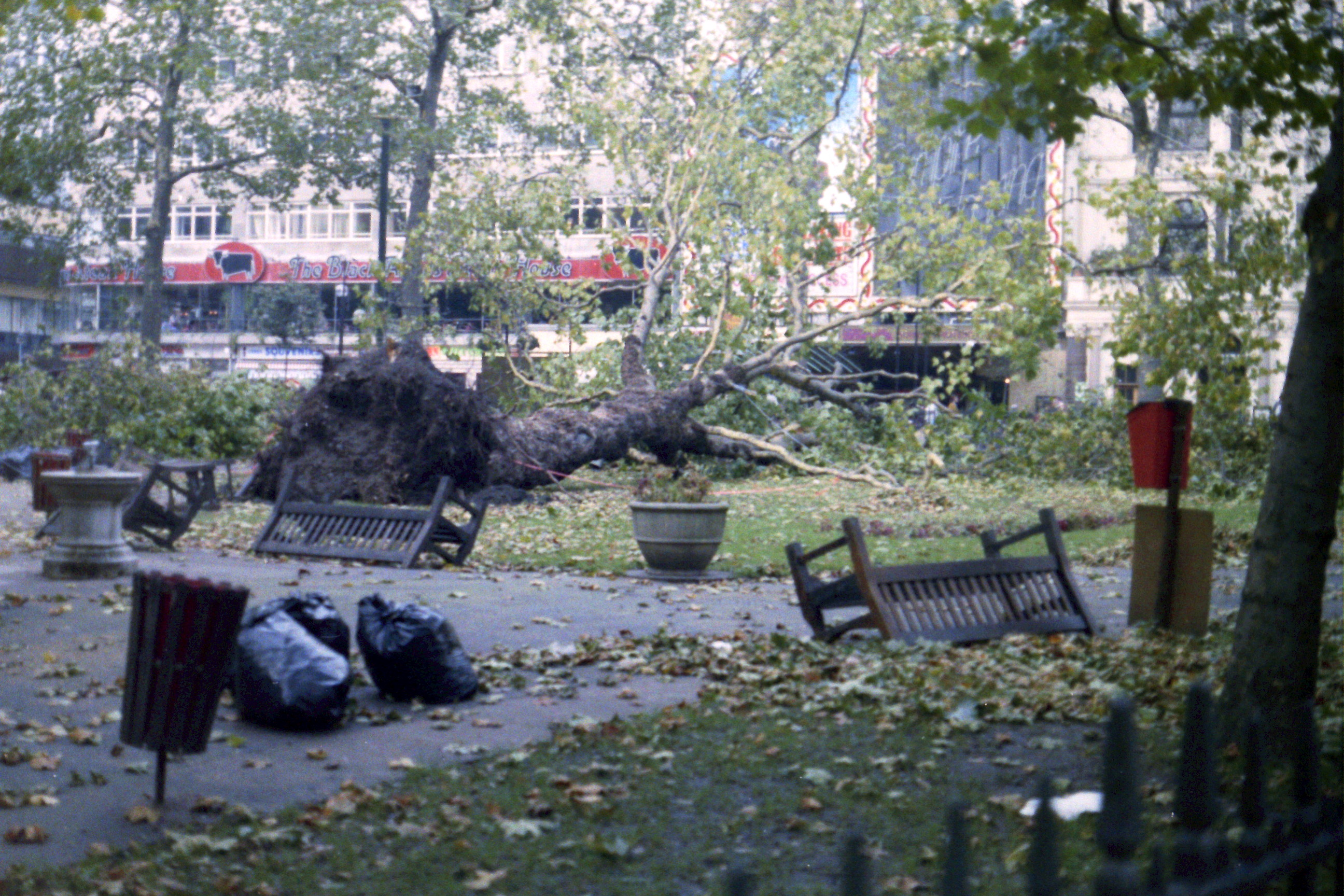
Fallen tree and upturned benches in London's Leicester Square

=== France ===
The départements of Finistère, Morbihan, Côtes-d'Armor, and Ille-et-Vilaine in Brittany, and the Cotentin Peninsula (Manche and part of Calvados) in Normandy were the areas in France most affected by the storm, which followed a line from Morbihan and Rennes to Deauville. 1.79 million homes were left without electricity supply and water, and a quarter of Brittany's forest was destroyed. The total damage was estimated at ₣23 billion.

Météo France announced "une petite tempête en provenance des Açores" (a little storm coming in from the Azores), which reached Brittany's coast at about 18:00, later than expected. This depression caused little damage, with only 50 to 60 km/h (31 to 37 mph; 27 to 32 kn) winds. A much deeper depression hit Ushant on the extreme western tip of Brittany at midnight. It was measured at 948 mbar (28.0 inHg) at the Brest-Guipavas weather station, the lowest reading in its records dating back to 1945.

Weather stations on the coast at pointe du Raz, pointe Saint-Mathieu and Penmarch gave no readings, as they were damaged by the high winds. The wind speed measured at Brest was 148 km/h (92 mph; 80 kn). The centre of the storm crossed Brittany from Penmarch to Saint-Brieuc at 110 km/h (68 mph; 59 kn), with gusts of wind up to 187 km/h (116 mph; 101 kn) at Quimper, 200 km/h (120 mph; 110 kn) at Ushant, and 220 km/h (140 mph; 120 kn) at la pointe de Penmarch and Granville. Waves were measured at 16 m (52 ft) off Ushant and Belle Île.

Similar strength storms in France since 1960:

- Tempête Vivian in 1990 (generally milder)
- Cyclones Lothar and Martin in December 1999, which claimed 140 lives, equally severe in Germany; more southern neighbouring countries also saw multiple deaths.
- Cyclone Klaus which struck worse southern France and northern Spain in 2009 and claimed 26 lives.

The Saint-Cœur de Marie church at Concarneau was damaged but never rebuilt, and was finally demolished a few years later.

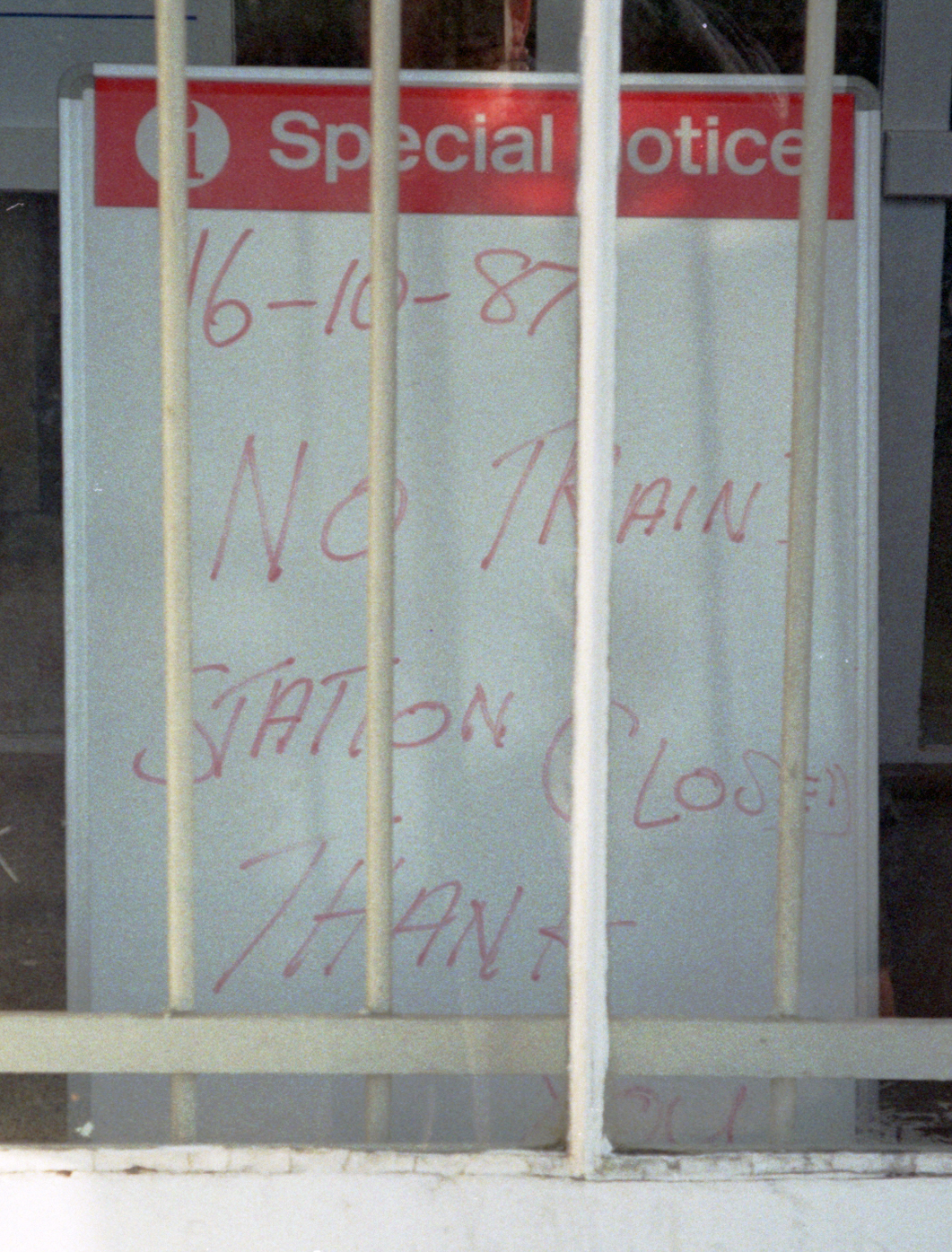
'Station closed' notice at Honor Oak Park, 16 October 1987.

The Herald of Free Enterprise was caught in the storm off Cape Finisterre as it was making its way for scrapping in Taiwan. The ship was cast adrift after its tow rope parted, finally resuming its journey on 19 October 1987.

== Aftermath ==
The storm cost the insurance industry £2 billion, making it the second most expensive UK weather event on record to insurers after the Burns' Day Storm of 1990. Peak wind velocities were in the early hours of the morning, which may have helped reduce the death toll.

The storm hit the Isle of Wight at 02:00. Shanklin Pier, a central landmark in the seaside resort of Shanklin on the southeast coast of the island, was broken into three pieces as a result of mountainous waves in Sandown Bay that struck the structure. Plans to rebuild the pier were soon abandoned as the company supervising the pier's refurbishment prior to the storm went bankrupt, and the rest of the pier was demolished by contractors shortly afterwards. A monument now stands in front of what used to be the pier entrance.

A great deal of effort and money was put into the post-storm clean-up of forests and wooded areas. The writer Oliver Rackham and the charity Common Ground were active in trying to prevent unnecessary destruction of trees which, although fallen, were still living. Some landowners, such as the National Trust, did not attempt complete clearing and replanting, realising that there was a unique opportunity to study the patterns of natural regeneration after such an event.

A number of wild boar may have escaped from captivity during the storm, after enclosures were damaged by falling trees. These animals have since bred and established populations in woods across southern England.

A more positive aspect could be found among some British gardeners; as Heather Angel wrote in the Royal Horticultural Society's Journal:

In some places this natural disaster has resulted in splendid vistas - views long since forgotten by some and never before seen by a whole new generation. Because of gaps left by fallen trees, visitors to Arundel Castle, the ancestral home of the Dukes of Norfolk, can now look out over the picturesque town... At the renowned woodland rhododendron garden at Leonardslee, Sussex, the gale... opened magnificent views by removing about a thousand trees which owner Robin Loder said he would never have had the courage to thin out himself.

=== Criticism of the Met Office ===
The Met Office was severely criticised by most of the national press for failing to forecast the storm correctly.

The Met Office conducted an internal inquiry, scrutinised by two independent assessors, and a number of recommendations were made. Chiefly, observational coverage of the atmosphere over the ocean to the south and west of the UK was improved by increasing the quality and quantity of observations from ships, aircraft, buoys and satellites. Continued refinements were made to the computer models used in forecasting, and changes were made in the training of forecasters. In addition, reforms in the way the Met Office reports warnings of severe weather were implemented, leading to substantially more warnings being issued in the future. Further deployment of improved tracking devices and improvements in the computer model simulations were supported by the purchase of an additional Cray supercomputer. Warnings for the Burns' Day Storm just over two years later were accurate and on time, although the model forecast hinged on observations from two ships in the Atlantic near the developing storm the day before it reached the UK.

Michael Fish's 15 October 1987 forecast on the BBC

BBC meteorologist Michael Fish drew particular criticism for reporting several hours before the storm hit:

Earlier on today, apparently, a woman rang the BBC and said she heard there was a hurricane on the way. Well, if you're watching, don't worry; there isn't. But, having said that, actually, the weather will become very windy. But most of the strong winds, incidentally, will be down over Spain and across into France.

Fish has subsequently claimed that his comments about a hurricane had nothing to do with the UK; they referred to Florida, USA, and were linked to a news story immediately preceding the weather bulletin, but had been so widely repeated out of context that the British public remains convinced that he was referring to the approaching storm. According to Fish, the woman in question was actually a colleague's mother who was about to go on holiday in the Caribbean, and had called regarding Hurricane Floyd to see if it would be safe to travel.

Fish went on to warn viewers that it would be "very windy" across the south of England, but predicted that the storm would move further south along the English Channel and the British mainland would escape the worst effects. The remainder of his warning has frequently been left out when this forecast has been repeated on television, which only adds to the public's misconception of that day's forecasting. His analysis has been defended by weather experts. In particular, the lack of a weather ship in the Southwest Approaches, due to Met Office cutbacks, meant the only way of tracking the storm was by using satellite data, as automatic buoys had not been deployed at the time.

Ironically, earlier forecasts as far back as the preceding weekend had correctly identified that gale-force winds would affect southern England. However, later runs of the model had indicated a more southerly track for the low pressure system, incorrectly indicating that the strongest winds would be confined to Northern and Central France. The French meteorological office used a different computer weather model to the British, and the French model proved more accurate in predicting the severity of the storm in the Channel.

The French meteorological service did correctly predict and warn for the storm and its intensity, but it might have been otherwise. Indeed, the ECMWF model forecast from 14 October 12 UTC failed to predict the strong winds and the storm position (although previous runs were closer to reality), and this could have led to inadequate warnings. This unusual inconsistency of ECMWF could have been a data assimilation issue, or came from poor data. In contrast, the French large scale model EMERAUDE made better predictions, while still underestimating the winds. It is recognised that without the experience of the forecasters, the exceptional aspects of the storm would have been missed.

In the wake of the storm, the Met Office set up the National Severe Weather Warning Service.

It has been said that as 15–16 October 1987 approached, shipping weather forecasts warned of storm movements in the North Atlantic, with the result that ships stayed away from North Atlantic storm tracks, depriving North Atlantic meteorology of a major necessary source of weather report data.

=== New understandings ===
Following the storm, meteorologists at the University of Reading led by Professor Keith Browning developed the sting jet concept. During reanalysis of the storm they identified a mesoscale flow where the most damaging winds were shown to be emanating from the evaporating tip of the hooked cloud head on the southern flank of the cyclone. This cloud, hooked like a scorpion's tail, gives the wind region its name the "sting jet".

=== Climatological context ===
It is sometimes claimed that this storm was the worst since the Great Storm of 1703, but this has been challenged as ignoring storms outside the south east of England. Storms of this strength regularly form over the north Atlantic, where they typically track to the north of Scotland. Storms of such a strength have a return period of 30 to 40 years. The unusual aspect of the storm was that it struck the densely populated south east of England. That winds in the south east had return periods of 1 in 200 years does not mean the winds of this strength occur once every 200 years, but that the winds have a 0.5% probability of happening in a given year.^{[Note 1]}

Following this storm 1.3 million incidents of damage were reported, which is only exceeded by the gale of January 1976 where destruction covered a wider area of the UK, with 1.5 million reports of damage. The Burns' Day storm hit the United Kingdom in January 1990, less than three years later and with comparable intensity. The Great Storm of 1968 (Hurricane Low Q) had crossed Great Britain between the Pennines and Perthshire with the highest-ever recorded peak wind speeds (134 mph). At the time this was the strongest wind gust ever recorded in the United Kingdom, though this was superseded in 1986 when a 173 mph (278 km/h) gust was recorded at Cairn Gorm. The 1968 storm, for which no warning was given, devastated agriculture and 5% of forestry in Scotland, toppled shipbuilding cranes on the Clyde, and left almost 2000 people homeless in the Central Belt.

== Wider impacts ==
Following the storm, few dealers made it to their desks, and stock market trading was suspended twice; the market closed early at 12:30. The disruption meant the City was unable to respond to the late trading at the beginning of the Wall Street fall-out on Friday 16 October, when the Dow Jones Industrial Average recorded its greatest-ever one-day slide at the time, a fall of 108.36. City traders and investors spent the weekend, 17–18 October, repairing damaged gardens in between trying to guess market reaction and assessing the damage. 19 October, Black Monday, was memorable as being the first business day of the London markets after the Great Storm.

== See also ==
- List of natural disasters in the United Kingdom
- Night of the Big Wind (1839)
- Hurricane Charley (1986)
- Burns' Day Storm (1990)
- Glanrhyd Bridge collapse
- Hurricane Ophelia (2017)
- Storm Eunice
- Storm Lothar

== Notes ==
1. Common Misconceptions, Part 1 - Return Periods
