= Cyclone Dirk =

2013 European windstorm

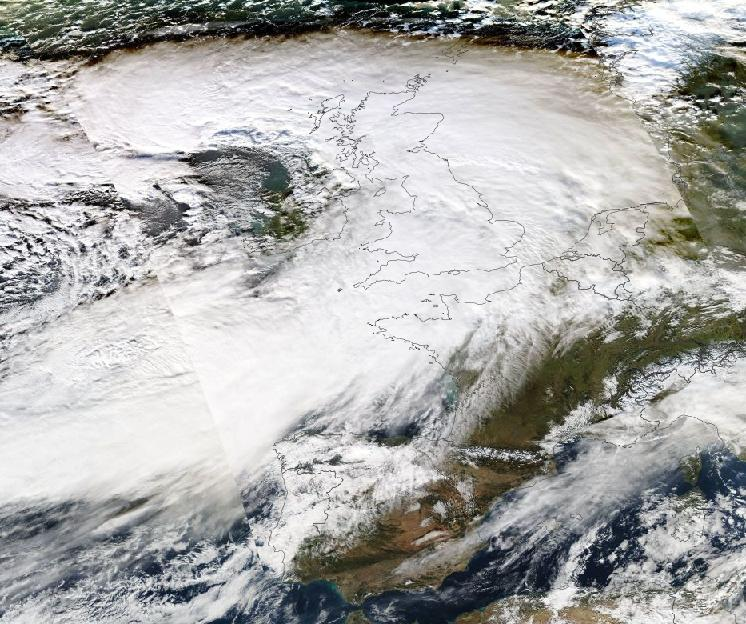
- Dirk over Western Europe 23 December 2013

Meteorological history
- Formed: 21 December 2013
- Dissipated: 27 December 2013

European windstorm, Extratropical cyclone, Winter storm
- Highest gusts: 228 km/h (142 mph)
- Lowest pressure: 927 mb (27.4 inHg)

Overall effects
- Fatalities: 6 (4 UK, 1 France, 1 in the ocean.)
- Areas affected: Ireland, United Kingdom, France, Netherlands, Belgium, Luxembourg, Germany, Norway, Denmark, Spain, Iceland, Faroe Islands, Portugal, Switzerland, Italy

Cyclone Dirk was a large and deep European windstorm that affected Western Europe from the Iberian Peninsula to Iceland from 22 December 2013.

== Meteorological history ==
Dirk formed over North America, some storminess was associated with the low in Canada, before it moved into the Atlantic. The preceding weather in North America saw a steep temperature gradient (temperatures in New York 21 °C [70 °F], Montreal −7 °C [19 °F]) which enhanced the jet stream in the North Atlantic. The low moved under this powerful jet stream where it explosively deepened before reaching Western Europe.

Deepening below 935 hPa (27.6 inHg) is considered uncommon in the North Atlantic, but has been recorded on a number of occasions, measured from ships transiting the ocean and from land based-recording stations. Offshore the minimum low pressure of the "Dirk" storm was forecast to reach a low of 927 hPa (27.4 inHg).

On land the low pressure during the storm was measured at 936.8 hPa (27.66 inHg) on 24 December at Stornoway, Isle of Lewis off the north west coast of Scotland. This was the lowest atmospheric pressure measured in Britain and Ireland since 1886 (127 years), when a low of 931.2 hPa (27.50 inHg) was recorded in Belfast, Northern Ireland. The most recent low pressure record near such values in Stornoway was measured on 20 December 1982 at 937.6 hPa (27.69 inHg). The all-time low pressure record for the British Isles remains at 925.4 hPa (27.33 inHg), recorded at Ochtertyre, Crieff in Perthshire on 26 January 1884.

At the southernmost tip of the Faroe Islands a low air pressure of 932.2 hPa (27.53 inHg) was recorded on Christmas Eve at Akraberg lighthouse. This was not as low as the Faroese record of 930.3 hPa, set at Vagar airport during the passage of the Braer Storm of January 1993.

== Forecast ==
Met Éireann issued nationwide orange wind and marine alerts for winds of 50 to 80 km/h (31 to 50 mph) with gusts of 100 to 130 km/h (62 to 81 mph). The UK Met Office issued national severe weather warnings for wind and rain across southwest and northern areas of the UK for the 23 and 24 December. Forty to sixty millimetres of rain was expected across southern England and Wales on 23 December, with gales and severe gales with gusts of 70–80 mph (110–130 km/h) gusts and blizzards over the Scottish mountains on 24 December. The storm was described as a "perturbation tempétueuse" (stormy disturbance) by Météo France, who issued orange warnings to parts of Brittany on 22 December. These warnings were expanded to an orange alert across 14 departments in Normandy, Picardy and Nord-Pas-de-Calais on 23 December. French Meteorologists stated the storm would not be as strong as the devastating Lothar and Martin, a pair of storms which hit France in late December 1999. The Norwegian Meteorological Institute issued a warning for Christmas Eve for the whole of Southern Norway.

== Impact ==
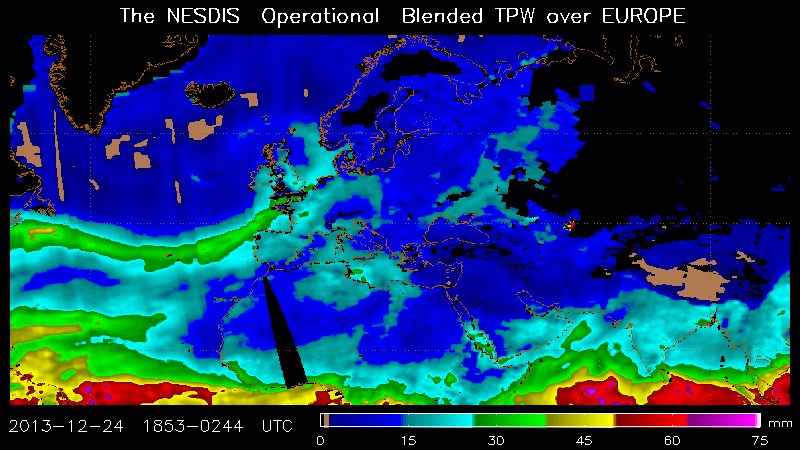
Total Precipitable Water 24 December

Dirk brought heavy rain to most counties of Southernmost England, from Dorset to Kent, 50 to 67 mm (2.0 to 2.6 in) of rain fell which caused many pockets of flooding on 23 and 24 December. Rainfall for the 24 hours to 09:00 UTC on 24 December was 66.8 mm (2.63 in) at Fontmell Magna, Dorset; 66.7 mm (2.63 in) at Boscombe Down, Wiltshire (the greatest ever recorded there in 24 hours); 61.0 mm (2.40 in) at Mickleham, Surrey; and 63.2 mm (2.49 in) at Wych Cross, East Sussex – usually three-quarters of the whole-month's rainfall at these points.

Northwestern Spain saw strong wind gusts, with coastal areas seeing large waves and wind damage. A gust of 154 kilometres per hour (42.8 m/s; 96 mph) was measured at the Estaca de Bares peninsula in Galicia. A strong frontal system from the storm passed over continental Europe.

The Alps saw strong Foehn winds with a Christmas thaw and several warmth records broken. A peak gust was measured at the French station Iraty in the Pyrenees at 228 km/h (142 mph). In the English Channel gusts up to 148 km/h (92 mph) were measured on 24 December. In the Swiss Alps winds over 200 km/h (120 mph) were recorded. MeteoSwiss recorded at Gütsch Andermatt (2,287 m [7,503 ft]) a peak wind of 208 km/h (129 mph), the highest value since 1981).

Weather stations in many parts of Germany saw the warmest 24 December since records began. Binningen in Basel recorded 17.1 °C (62.8 °F) (5–8 °C [9.0–14.4 °F] above normal). In Salzburg on the north edge of the Alps 15.6 °C (60.1 °F) made it the mildest 25 December seen. After the low-pressure fronts passed a wake vortex formed over the Alps, which brought to northern Italy severe storms and heavy snowfall in the Alps (Northern Ticino, Misox up to 120 cm [47 in] in a day, East Tyrol up to 80 cm [31 in]). San Bernardino, Switzerland saw the most one-day snowfall since measurements began (thus at least 1952).

UK Met Office maximum hourly gust speed 18:00 23 December to 07:00 24 December.
Site	Area	Elevation (m)	Max gust speed (mph)	Max gust speed (km/h)
Needles Old Battery	Isle of Wight	80	92	148
Berry Head	Devon	58	84	135
Langdon Bay	Kent	117	76	122
Gorleston	Norfolk	4	75	121
Manston	Kent	49	75	121
Mumbles Head	West Glamorgan	43	75	121
South Uist Range	Western Isles	4	75	121
Plymouth Mountbatten	Devon	50	74	119
Solent	Hampshire	9	74	119
Aberdaron	Gwynedd	95	73	117
North Wyke	Devon	177	73	117

UK Met Office 24 Hour Rainfall Totals 18 Dec 07:00 – 19 Dec 07:00, 2013.
Site	Area	Precipitation (mm)
Kenley Airfield	Greater London	53.6
Charlwood	Surrey	41
Wych Cross	East Sussex	38.6
Alice Holt Lodge	Hampshire	33.8
Goudhurst	Kent	32.2
Middle Wallop	Hampshire	31.6
Frittenden	Kent	30.8
Cluanie Inn	Ross & Cromarty	30.8
Liscombe	Somerset	30.4
Hurn	Dorset	29.8
Larkhill	Wiltshire	29.2

=== Transport ===
In anticipation of severe weather, on 22 December rail companies announced that travellers with tickets for the following day would be permitted to travel that day instead. Network Rail imposed speed restrictions from 16:00 on 23 December. Network Rail described the damage to rail infrastructure in southern England as worse than that seen during the St. Jude storm in October.

- East Coast lifted ticket restrictions and announced it would run a scaled back service.
- East Midlands Trains said it would run a full service on 23 December.
- First Great Western Trains said there was major disruption between Exmouth and Barnstaple, Looe and Liskeard and Paignton.
- Arriva CrossCountry services were not running south of Bristol.
- A landslip at Coulsdon in Surrey damaged a train and closed the line.
- In France the railway services in Brittany between Brest and Saint Brieuc, and between Caen and Cherbourg in Normandy were disrupted, operations resuming on the lines on 24 December.
- A commuter train derailed in Galicia Spain after a tree fell on the tracks, none of the passengers or crew were reported as injured.

In Finistere, France the Pont de l'Iroise was closed to traffic overnight on 23–24 December. The Saint-Nazaire Bridge crossing the river Loire also had traffic restrictions in place. The Queen Elizabeth II Bridge of the Dartford Crossing was closed from 12pm on 23 December with traffic running in two directions through the Dartford Tunnel. The Sheppey Crossing was closed, with the Orwell Bridge also closed to high sided vehicles near Ipswich. Denmark saw few problems with transport, but high-sided and wind-sensitive vehicles were being warned to stay off the roads, especially the larger bridges.

LD Lines cancelled boats between Le Havre and Dieppe to Portsmouth on 23 and 24 December, with a crossing between Saint-Nazaire and Gijón, Spain also cancelled. Brittany Ferries cancelled crossings from Saint-Malo in Brittany and Ouistreham in Normandy to Portsmouth. Although the ferry from Cherbourg to Portsmouth was due to leave at 10.30pm on 23 December. Brittany Ferries also cancelled the Roscoff to Plymouth ferry. Irish Ferries cancelled the Jonathan Swift Fast Ferry between Holyhead and Dublin on the afternoon of 23 December. 24 December saw all Caledonian MacBrayne ferry services to the Scottish Western Isles cancelled, with the company hoping to run a relief service on Christmas Day. The Isle of Man Steam Packet Company also ran a Christmas Day service, after cancelling sailings, which the company said had not happened since the late 1970s.

The Port of Dover closed at 21:00 23 December due to strong winds and high seas, reopening at 07:30 the morning after. Reports that several ferries spent the night unable to dock riding out the storm in the English Channel. The ferry MV Cap Finistere left on Sunday 22 on a service to Bilbao but turned back to shelter near Brittany after encountering a storm in Bay of Biscay; injured passengers had to be airlifted from the ferry. In the English Channel sea conditions were described as the worst in 16 years. Cargo ship Horst B ran aground in strong winds in the Faroe Islands. A cargo ship reported losing 30 containers overboard off the coast of Brittany.

All flights to and from the Scilly Isles were cancelled and rescheduled until 24 December. Flights to and from Southampton Airport were badly affected by the storm. Gatwick Airport's north terminal was affected by power disruptions on 24 December, stranding thousands of passengers as 145 flights were cancelled due to flooding of electricity substations at the airport. Heathrow cancelled a couple of dozen flights on 23 December. Bristol Airport and Glasgow Airport also reported some disruption. In Spain delays and cancellations were reported at airports in Bilbao, Asturias, Santander and Vigo.

=== Energy supplies ===
In France 240,000 customers were left without electricity, of which 130,000 were in Brittany. In Cornwall, 2,700 homes were reported to be without power, with 100,000 homes reported without power across Southern England. A maximum of 88,000 homes were left without power in Spanish Galicia. Ireland saw up to 30,000 customers without power from the storm.

=== Flooding ===
Saturated ground led to localised flooding in southern England (see first paragraph of Impact). A major incident was declared in the region of Leatherhead and Dorking with Fire Brigade unions calling off a planned strike in Surrey and Kent. An Environment Agency spokesman said flooding in Kent and Sussex were the worst to hit the area since Autumn 2000. In France the Breton town of Morlaix reported flooding.

== Casualties ==
In France a 12-year-old boy was killed by a falling wall in Vire, lower Normandy. A Russian seaman was missing from the cargo ship Victoriaborg 220 km (140 mi) northwest of Brest in the storm. In the United Kingdom casualties included two men in England and one woman in Wales, with a further woman casualty in a car accident in Shropshire in what was described as "difficult weather conditions".

== Aftermath ==
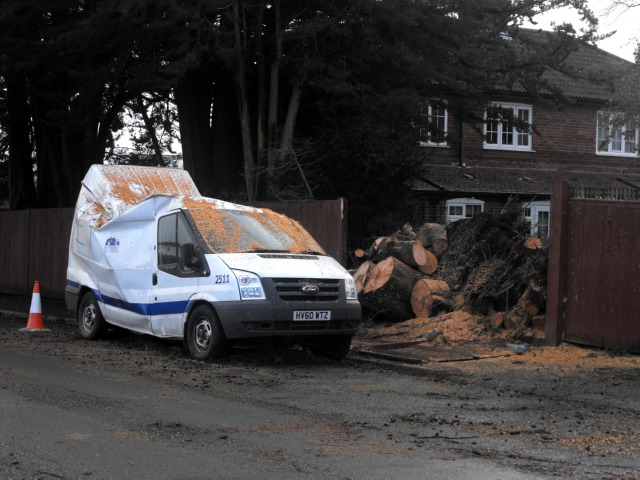
Cleared tree damage to a vehicle near Southampton

Manuel Valls the French Minister of the Interior while visiting the heavily affected region of Brittany, said an error had been made in the forecasting and preparation for the Dirk storm. He said that officials had severely underestimated the danger posed, and ordered Prefects to investigate what preparations and warnings were undertaken, saying that decrees describing the worst affected regions as 'natural catastrophes' (a constitutional French designation) would be published rapidly.

On 21 January 2014 the Energy and Climate Change Select Committee of the House of Commons of the United Kingdom held a one-off evidence session on power disruption during Christmas and the New Year. During the session the Energy Networks Association announced that around 750,000 customers lost electricity during the stormy period over Christmas, with 93-95% of these reconnected within 24 hours. The House of Commons Energy Select Committee on 21 January 2014 was critical of the speed at which UK power networks responded, however the company said that it was now much quicker than it had been in the past at responding to incidents. Mark Mathieson, managing director of SSE's electricity networks, told the committee on 21 January that: "It was just the impact of the event. It was a massive event. Certainly we haven't seen damage like this in the south back from the early [19]90s and even back to the Great Storm of 1987". He said that "tried and tested" plans made by the power companies struggled as wind speeds escalated significantly, and predictions failed to estimate the duration of strong winds which resulted in greater damage, coupled with the national reach of the storm which prevented regional distribution companies relying on mutual aid from other regions.

Gatwick Airport conducted its own investigation into the chaotic disruption caused at the airport on Christmas Eve, which saw police being brought in to help staff deal with passengers. The airport accepted all the investigation's recommendations and allocated £30 million for their implementation.

On 3 February Perils AG announced an initial insured property loss estimate from the storm at €275 million, which was subsequently raised to €352 million in the second loss estimate released 23 March 2014. The French Federation of Insurance Companies (FFSA) estimated the insured damage caused by storm Dirk to amount to 100 million euros in France, causing more destruction and costing more to French insurance companies than tropical Cyclone Bejisa to Réunion and Mauritius in early 2014.
