= Cyclone Julia =

2012 cyclone

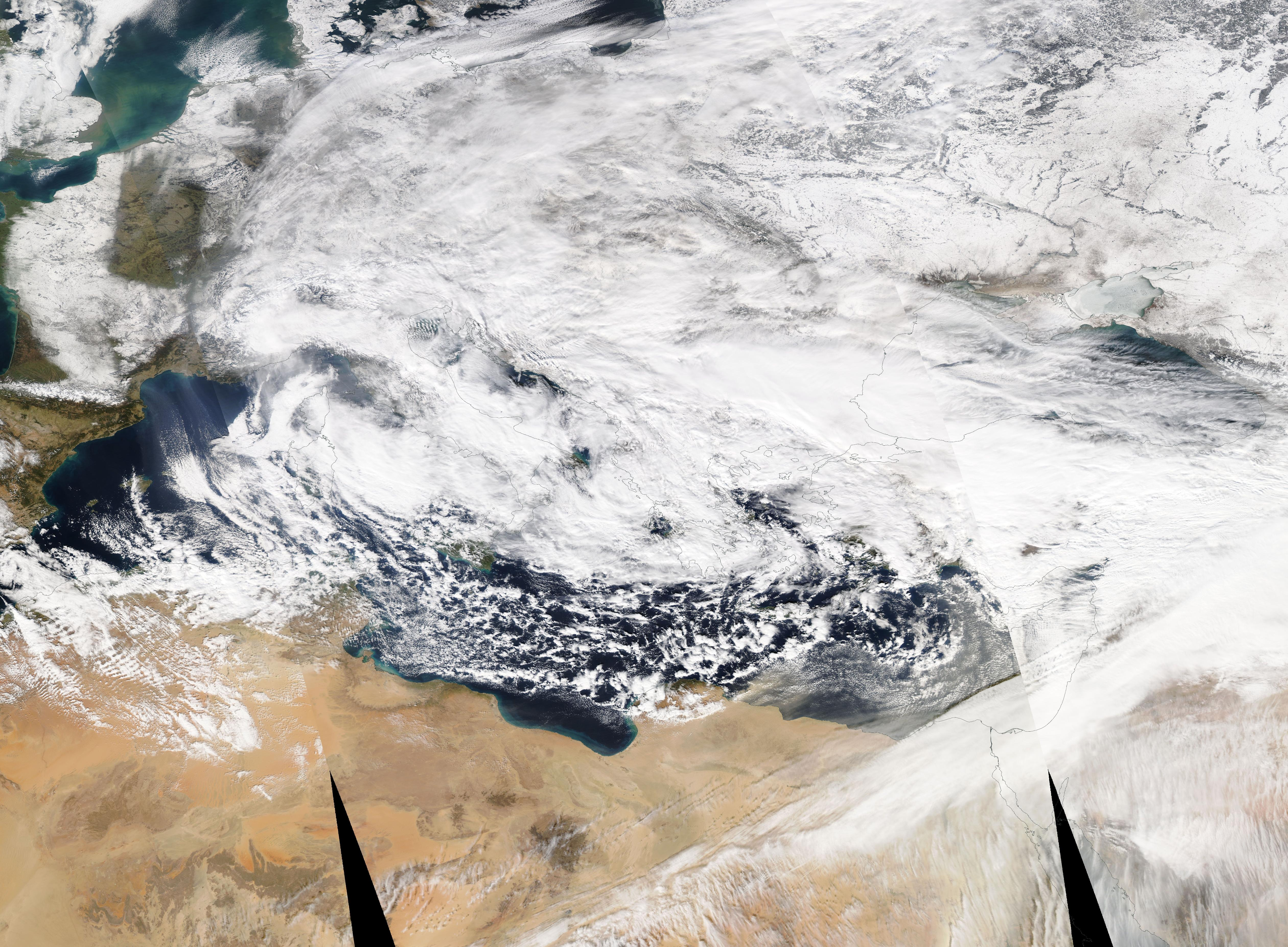
- Cyclone Julia on February 7, about a day after peak intensity.

Meteorological history
- Formed: February 2, 2012
- Dissipated: February 11, 2012

Meteorological information
- Highest winds: 110 km/h (70 mph)
- Lowest pressure: 982 hPa (mbar); 29.00 inHg

Overall effects
- Fatalities: At least 12
- Damage: > $6.4 million (2012 USD)
- Areas affected: Central Europe, Eastern Europe, France, Italy, Crete, Cyprus, North Africa, Levant, Turkey

Cyclone Julia brought heavy flooding and powerful winds to parts of Europe, the Mediterranean region, and North Africa in February 2012. Julia originated from an extratropical system that split off from its parent storm, in the western Mediterranean Sea on February 2. Despite the unfavorable conditions in the Mediterranean Sea, Julia strengthened, with winds peaking at 61 mph (98 km/h), and a minimum pressure of 982 mbar (29.0 inHg) on February 6. On February 7, the storm made landfall on the Peloponnesian Peninsula, and eventually dissipated over Turkey. Cyclone Julia caused at least $6.4 million (2012 USD) in damages, and resulted in at least 12 deaths. The storm also worsened the effects of the Early 2012 European cold wave across Europe and North Africa.

== Meteorological history ==
Map plotting the storm's track and intensity, according to the Saffir–Simpson scale Map key Saffir–Simpson scale Tropical depression (≤38 mph, ≤62 km/h) Tropical storm (39–73 mph, 63–118 km/h) Category 1 (74–95 mph, 119–153 km/h) Category 2 (96–110 mph, 154–177 km/h) Category 3 (111–129 mph, 178–208 km/h) Category 4 (130–156 mph, 209–251 km/h) Category 5 (≥157 mph, ≥252 km/h) Unknown Storm type Tropical cyclone Subtropical cyclone Extratropical cyclone, remnant low, tropical disturbance, or monsoon depression

On January 31, 2012, an extratropical storm developed over western France, which was named Julia by the Free University of Berlin. Within the next couple of days, the storm moved quickly southeastward into the Mediterranean Sea, but the system split in half on February 2, with the new low pressure center developing off the east coast of Spain, which was subsequently identified as Julia II. Over the next couple of days, Julia II moved westward while strengthening, before absorbing the original low pressure area of Julia I on February 4, near Italy. The storm weakened while passing to the south of Italy, before reorganizing on February 6. Afterward, Julia began to rapidly intensify, reaching peak intensity late on February 6, with a minimum low pressure of 982 mbar (29.0 inHg) and peak sustained winds at 61 mph (98 km/h). Around the same time, the system briefly lost its cold front. On February 7, Julia began to weaken and regained its frontal system, as the storm moved towards the Peloponnese. Later on the same day, Julia made landfall on the Peloponnese, bringing hurricane-force wind gusts and torrential rainfall. After landfall, Julia rapidly weakened, with the system becoming disorganized, while gradually moving eastward. On February 9, Julia made landfall in Turkey and began to accelerate eastward, while continuing to weaken. Julia continued to accelerate eastward over the next couple of days, before being absorbed into another extratropical system on February 11.

== Preparations and impact ==
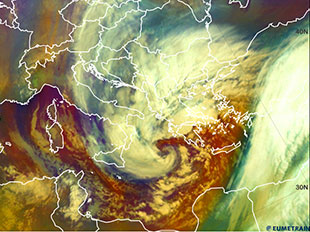
EUMETSAT satellite image of Cyclone Julia on February 6, nearing peak intensity.

On December 16, 2011, the NOAA had ceased monitoring storms in the Mediterranean Sea, possibly due to economic reasons and budget cuts. At the time of Julia's existence, no tropical cyclone agencies were known to be monitoring the system, possibly because the storm did not exist within any established basins' area of responsibility; only European weather agencies and the University of Berlin were known to have tracked the storm.

The system brought powerful tropical storm-force winds and hurricane-force gusts to parts of Italy, Crete, Greece. In addition, the storm brought heavy rainfall to widespread areas across Europe, Turkey, and North Africa, causing at least $6.4 million dollars and damages, and killing 12 people in Greece and Bulgaria. In Bulgaria and Greece, heavy rainfall from Julia, coupled with melting snow, triggered widespread flooding, and many rivers overflowing their banks. Bulgaria suffered the most damage from the storm, with $4.4 million alone incurred from losses in the country. Additionally, the Ivanovo Dam in Bulgaria burst during the deluge, flooding the village of Bisser downstream with 2.5 meters (8 feet) of water. In Bulgaria, the city of Svilengrad was also flooded after a dike collapsed near the village of Generalovo. In Greece, the hardest-hit areas were located in the northeast of the country, where Evros River burst its banks and submerged multiple villages. Cyclone Julia also worsened the effects of a major cold wave across Europe and North Africa, leading to more property damage and deaths. The storm's heavy snow caused 100 kilometres (62 mi) of the Danube River to freeze.

== See also ==
- Early 2012 European cold wave
- South Atlantic tropical cyclone
- Tropical Storm Rolf
- Cyclone Qendresa
- Cyclone Numa
- 2006 Central Pacific cyclone
- 1996 Lake Huron cyclone
