= Early 2012 European cold wave =

Cold wave in Europe in January 2012

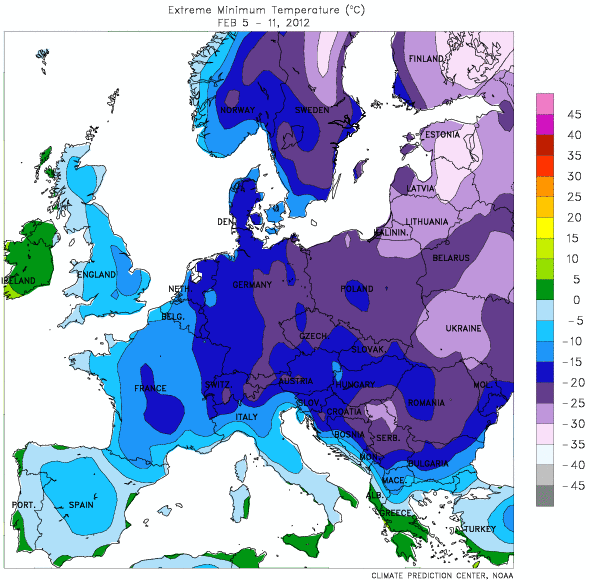
- Extreme minimum temperature 4 to 11 February 2012, computer generated contours, based on preliminary data

Meteorological history
- Formed: January 27, 2012
- Dissipated: February 17, 2012

Cold wave
- Lowest temp: −42.7 °C (−44.9 °F) (February 6, Inari, Finland)

Overall effects
- Fatalities: 904+
- Damage: $660 million (2012 USD)
- Areas affected: Europe and North Africa

A deadly cold wave started in Europe on January 27, 2012, and brought snow and freezing temperatures to much of the continent. There were more than 824 reported deaths in Europe and North Africa. Particularly low temperatures hit several Eastern and Northern European countries, reaching as low as −42.7 °C (−44.9 °F) in Finland. The heaviest snow was recorded in the Balkans. The cold weather was a result of an extensive area of very high pressure located over the north east of the continent in northern Russia, which circulated cold air from the east.

== Countries affected ==
=== Effects ===
==== Eastern, Northern and Western Europe ====
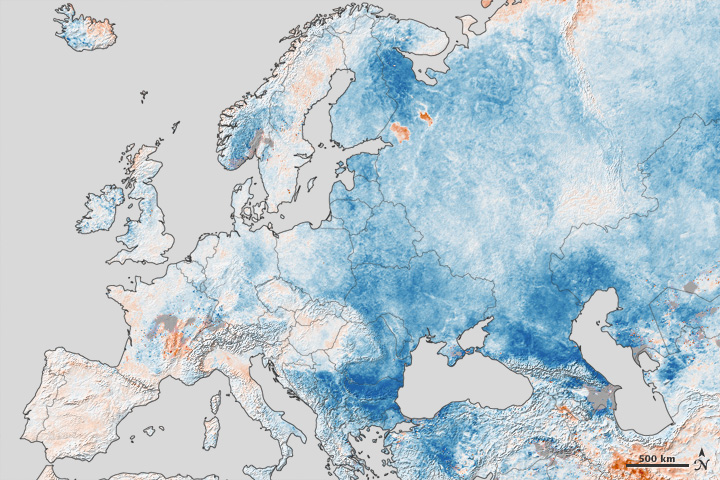
Land surface temperature anomaly of Europe between January 25 and February 1, 2012

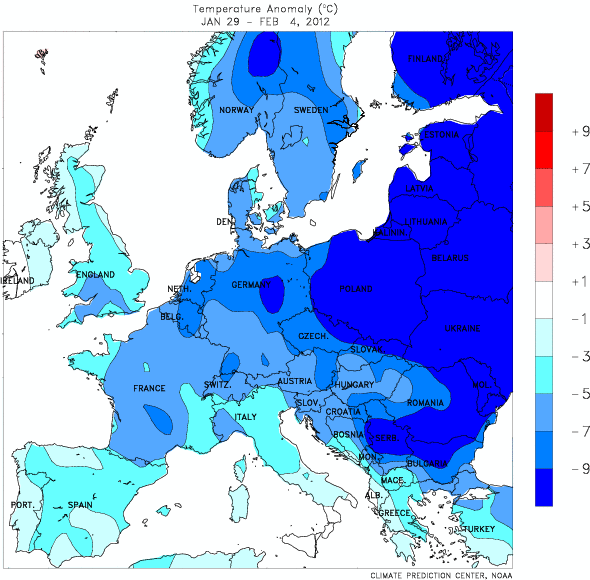
A map of the land temperature anomaly in Europe between January 29 and February 4, 2012.

The northern half of Europe was affected primarily by greater cold and – except for a period of early snow – low precipitation. The snowfall of the third week of January was up to 1 m (3.3 ft) of snow in a few days, particularly affecting Slovakia and Bulgaria. On Sunday, January 22, heavy snowfall in northern Námestovo caused an ice rink to collapse under the weight of the snow.

In Inari, Finland, temperatures of −42.7 °C (−44.9 °F) were recorded on February 6, the lowest temperatures in Europe. The village Kvilda in Sumava (Czech Republic) recorded temperatures of −38.1 °C (−36.6 °F) on February 3, the lowest temperatures in Central Europe.

Ukraine was especially affected by the onset of cold weather, at the end of January, the temperatures fell below −30 °C (−22 °F), at the time the snow was at least 30 cm (12 in), on February 3, over 100 cm (3.3 ft), and by the end of the first week of February, over 130 cm (4.3 ft) was recorded. The Ukrainian government announced that many of the public safety issues it was encountering were related to alcohol abuse in the context of the dangerously cold weather.

The Baltic states also recorded temperatures down to −30 °C (−22 °F). Moscow announced that, since the beginning of the last week of January, night temperatures ranged down to −25 °C (−13 °F).

The Mediterranean coast of southern France was covered in deep snow by the end of January. Corsica was buried under 40 cm (1.3 ft) of snow, and at times there were as many as 14,000 homes without electricity.

In early February, heavy snow pile-ups hit the Helsinki region. Belgium also was surprised by the snowfall. At the same time, the snow reached the British Isles, causing interruptions at London Heathrow Airport where up to 10 cm (3.9 in) of snow impeded many scheduled flights.

In Germany, the Elbe downstream of Magdeburg became impassable due to ice, as well as the entire Elbe–Havel Canal and parts of the Rhine–Main–Danube Canal. Supplies had to be sent to the island of Spiekeroog via aircraft for the second time in its history, as the ferry service was canceled on February 7, 2012, due to heavy ice conditions in the North Sea. On Lake Constance, the catamaran speed-boat traffic between Friedrichshafen and Konstanz had to be canceled due to the icing over of the port in Konstanz on February 7 until further notice. This port had not been frozen to such an extent since the winter of 1962–1963.

==== Mediterranean Sea, Danube and Balkans ====
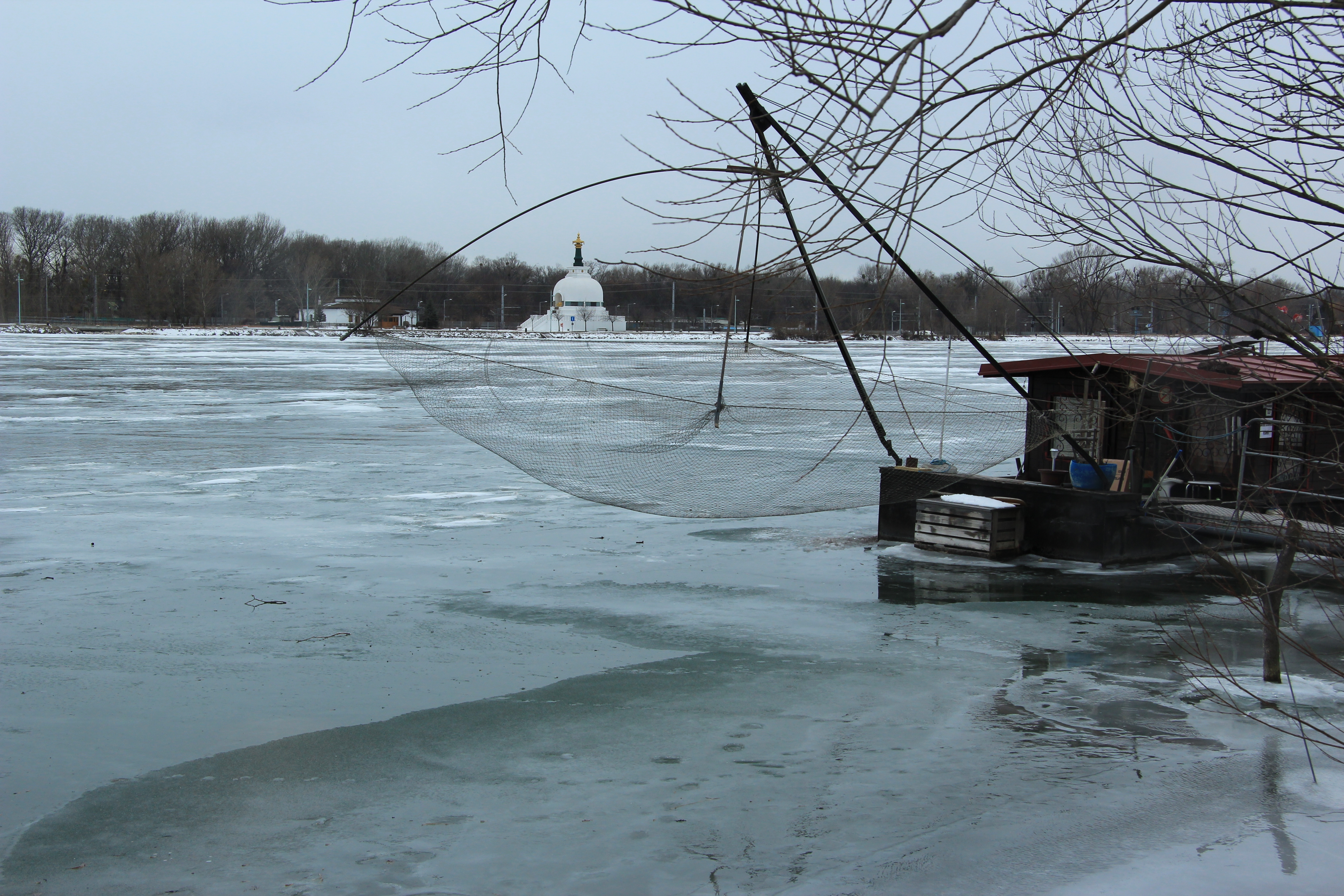
The Danube frozen near power plant at Vienna Freudenau

Italy, the Balkans and the Danube were in addition to cold weather also affected by heavy snowfall; Erfrierungsopfer also reported the majority of countries of this area, as well as extensive traffic delays and economic consequences. The cold wave covered the Maghreb in the western Mediterranean, as well as the Aegean, the Turkey and the Levant in the eastern part of the Mediterranean area. On Bologna fell 94 cm (37 in) of snow between February 1 and 12 with a maximum height on the ground of 65 cm (26 in); 190 cm (75 in) fell on Cesena (30m above sea level) with maximum height of 120 cm (47 in) and 326 cm (128 in) fell on Urbino where the snow accumulation on the ground reached 2 m (79 in) deep. Turkey, Spain and Portugal fell to low temperatures in early February, the temperature sometimes considerably below the freezing point. Snow fell in Mallorca for the first time since 1995, and even in Algiers, Algeria and southern Tunisia in Gabès. In Italy, there were extensive power outages (up to 120,000 people were without electricity) as well as traffic congestion, and the Army had to intervene for snow removal: in Rome, where snow had fallen before the weekend of February 4–5, it was almost impossible to drive. Until the second week of February deep winter conditions reigned throughout northern and central Italy, particularly in Marche, in Umbria, the Abruzzi and Emilia-Romagna. In Rome, after the snowfalls of February 11–12, 2,000 passengers had to spend the night in Fiumicino Airport.

=== Europe ===
- Bosnia and Herzegovina – In Bosnia and Herzegovina, this year's winter was one of the coldest and snowiest in the last 100 years. The snow depth in the capital Sarajevo reached 111 cm (43.7 inches) and in Mostar 86 cm (34 inches). On February 5 in Sarajevo, 5 people died because of cold weather in 3 hours. Snow and low temperatures stayed persistent until the month of March when drought hit the country. In March, not even 1 liter of precipitation fell throughout the whole country. In Sarajevo snow cover stayed until April. The cold wave killed anywhere from 15 to 50 people.

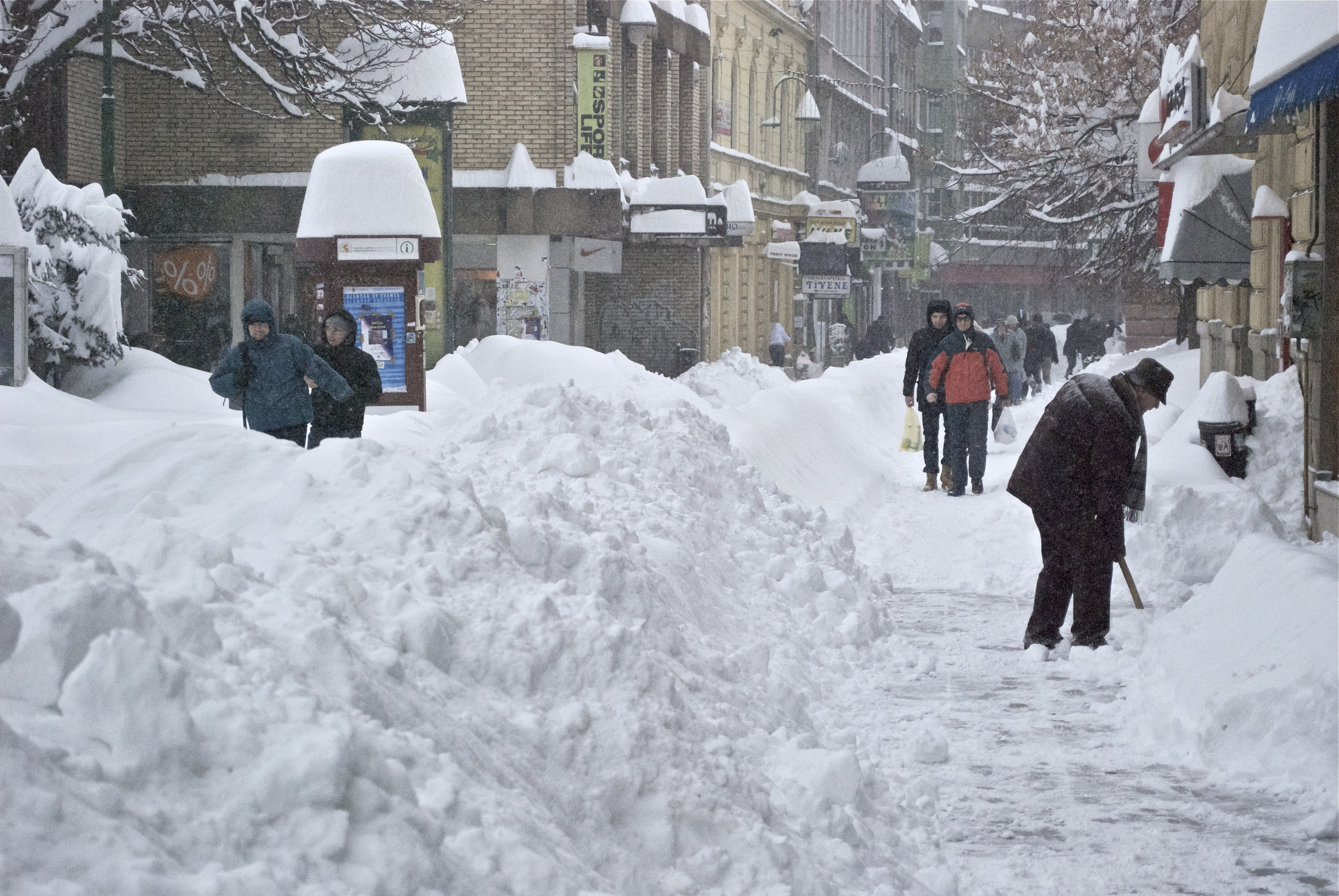
Record snowfall in Sarajevo

View of a street in Bucharest on February 13

- Belarus – Early in the day on January 30, subzero temperatures spread rapidly, data accessed by AccuWeather showed. According to meteoinfo.by, on the night of 11 through February 12, temperatures in the Brahin Raion dropped to −34.3 °C (−29.7 °F). According to National Agency BielTA, from January 1, more than 180 people died in domestic fires. Total number of casualties remain unknown.
- Bulgaria – Over 1 meter (3.3 feet) of snow fell in the mountainous areas of the country. Heavy snow fell also in many major cities. The snow depth reached 63 cm (24.8 inches) in Vidin, 61 cm (24 inches) in Vratsa and 48 cm (19 inches) in the capital Sofia. Temperatures dropped under −20 °C (−4 °F) in many parts of Bulgaria, with a low reading of −30 °C (−22 °F) in Knezha. The wall of the Ivanovo dam in southern Haskovo Province broke, flooding the village of Biser and killing 11 people, as well as inflicting serious infrastructural damage. At least 16 other deaths were reported throughout the country, due to the arctic temperatures.
- Croatia – As of February 6, three people died, with many villages being cut off, especially near Vrgorac and Imotski. The region of Dalmatia was most affected, with strong bora interrupting the power supply and heavy snowfall blocking traffic even in some coastal towns. Split experienced a record snowfall of 25 cm (9.8 inches).
- Cyprus – On February 29, it was reported that there was snowfall in Capital, Nicosia.
- Estonia – On February 5 temperature −35.0 °C (−31.0 °F) was recorded at the Jõgeva meteorological station, the day before a temperature of −34.8 °C (−30.6 °F) was recorded at Jõgeva too. Wind chill temperatures were near −40 °C (−40 °F).
- Denmark – On the morning of February 5, the lowest temperature in Denmark for 25 years was recorded in Odense with −25.9 °C (−14.6 °F).
- France – On February 6, BBC News reported 4 deaths, and 43 regions in France on high alert for 'exceptional' weather conditions. On February 11, the Six Nations Championship game between France and Ireland, was postponed shortly before kick-off, due to the pitch freezing, as temperatures plummeted beneath −10 °C (14 °F).
- Italy – Rome experienced a rare intense snowfall, and many of Venice's canals have frozen over, while very heavy snowfalls (up to 2m/7 ft in a couple of weeks) occurred in the Apennines. Temperatures plummeted under −20 °C (−4 °F) on February 6 in the north-west of the country where the lowest temperature at low elevation was recorded on February 7 of −23.9 °C (−11.0 °F) in Candiolo in the Province of Turin. At least 54 people have died.

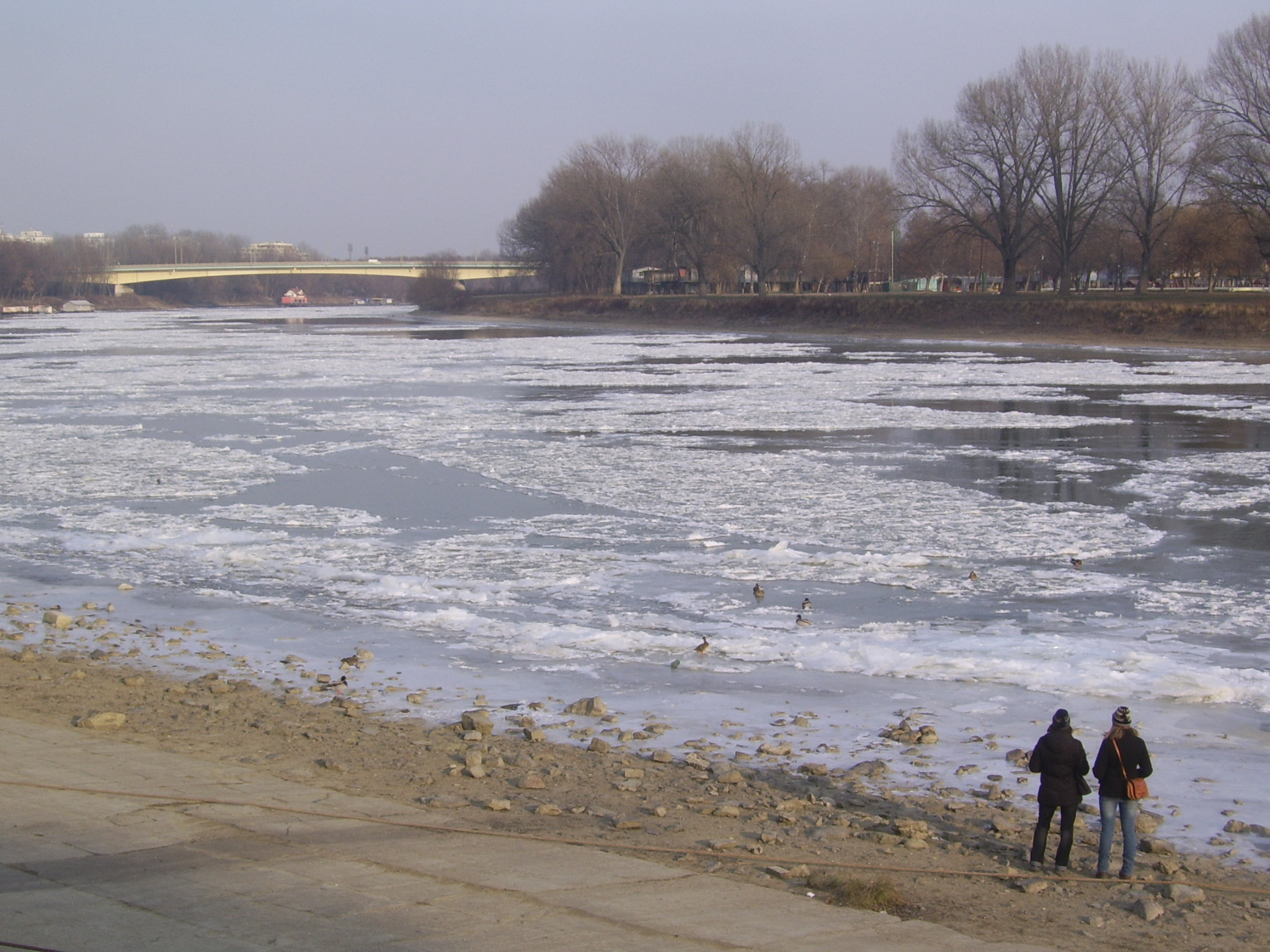
Tisza River near Szeged, Hungary

- Greece – Many homeless people froze to death and a dam on the Evros river burst due to pressure. Temperatures also plummeted to −15 °C (5 °F) in the northwest city of Florina.
- Latvia – The lowest temperature was recorded at the Strenči meteorological station, hitting −34.2 °C (−29.6 °F) on February 5. For several days not a single meteorological station reported a temperature above −20 °C (−4 °F). Because of the severe cold wave, some regions in Latvia experienced a shortage of power supply, an increased number of domestic fires were reported.
- Malta – The lowest temperature at grass level was measured at Zebbug. The temperature was that of −2.4 °C (27.7 °F). It was measured on Wednesday, February 8. An air temperature of 4.0 °C (39.2 °F) was also measured during one of a series of hailstorms which occurred during the month.
- Netherlands – A cold wave was registered in the Netherlands, with a low of −18.9 °C (−2.0 °F) in De Bilt, the lowest recorded since 1956, and a national low of −22.8 °C (−9.0 °F) in Lelystad, the lowest temperature recorded all over the Netherlands since 1985. A homeless man was frozen to death on February 2. People have been ice-skating on the canals of Amsterdam.
- Poland – Early in the day on January 30, subzero cold spread widely over Belarus, Ukraine, Romania, Bulgaria, Serbia and eastern Poland, data accessed by AccuWeather.com showed. From the January 1, 2012, 103 people froze to death. Fire and Rescue Service reported 360 domestic fires during one night (February 11–12), and almost 12000 fire accidents this year. Reports state 107 people died in flames with 550 more suffer various degrees of burns. Due to carbon monoxide poisoning 24 people died.

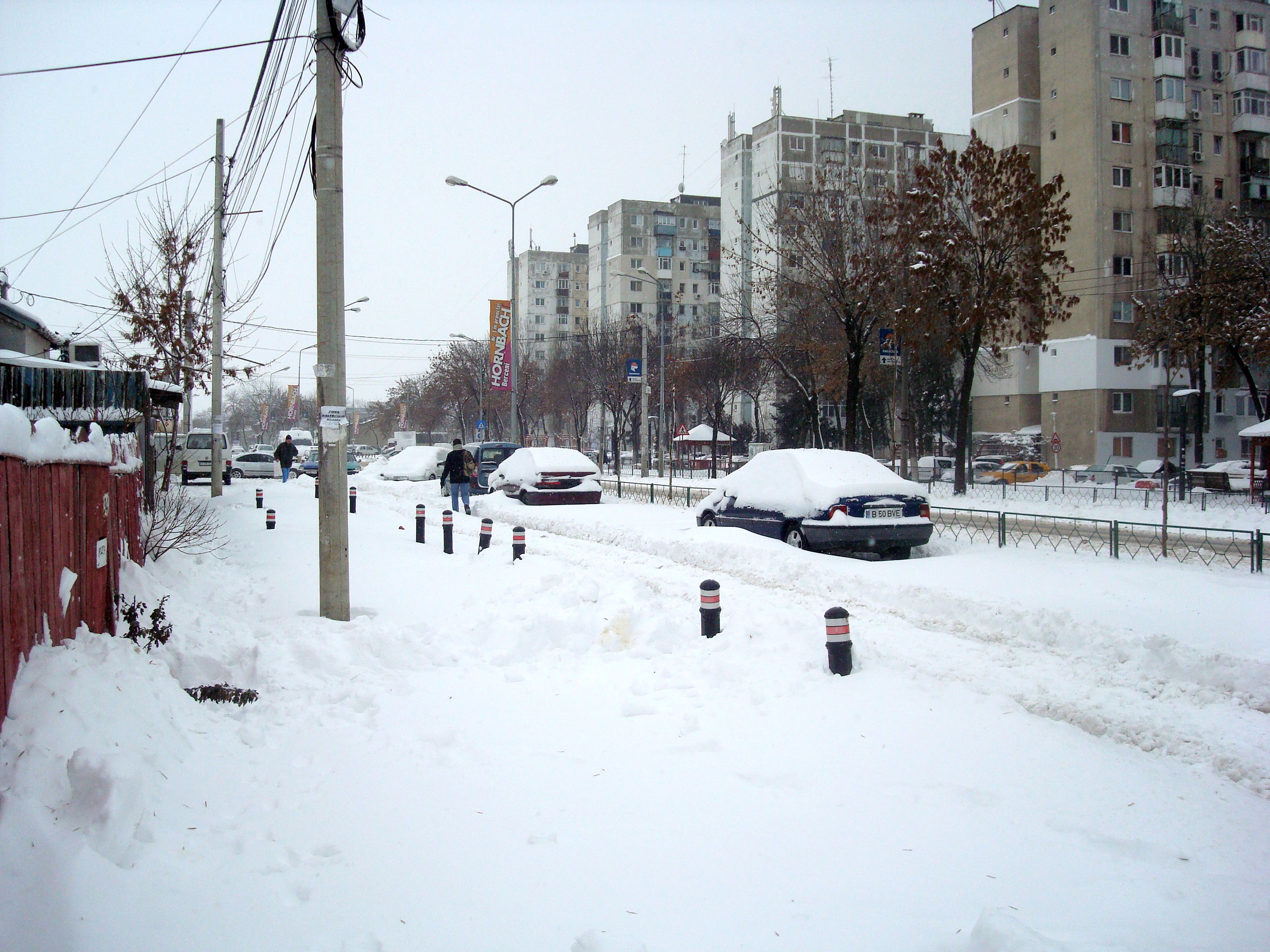
Winter of 2012 in south of Bucharest, Romania

- Romania – At least 86 people have died. In some areas, the bitter cold was followed by heavy snow. The snow depth in the capital Bucharest reached 60 cm (23.5 inches).

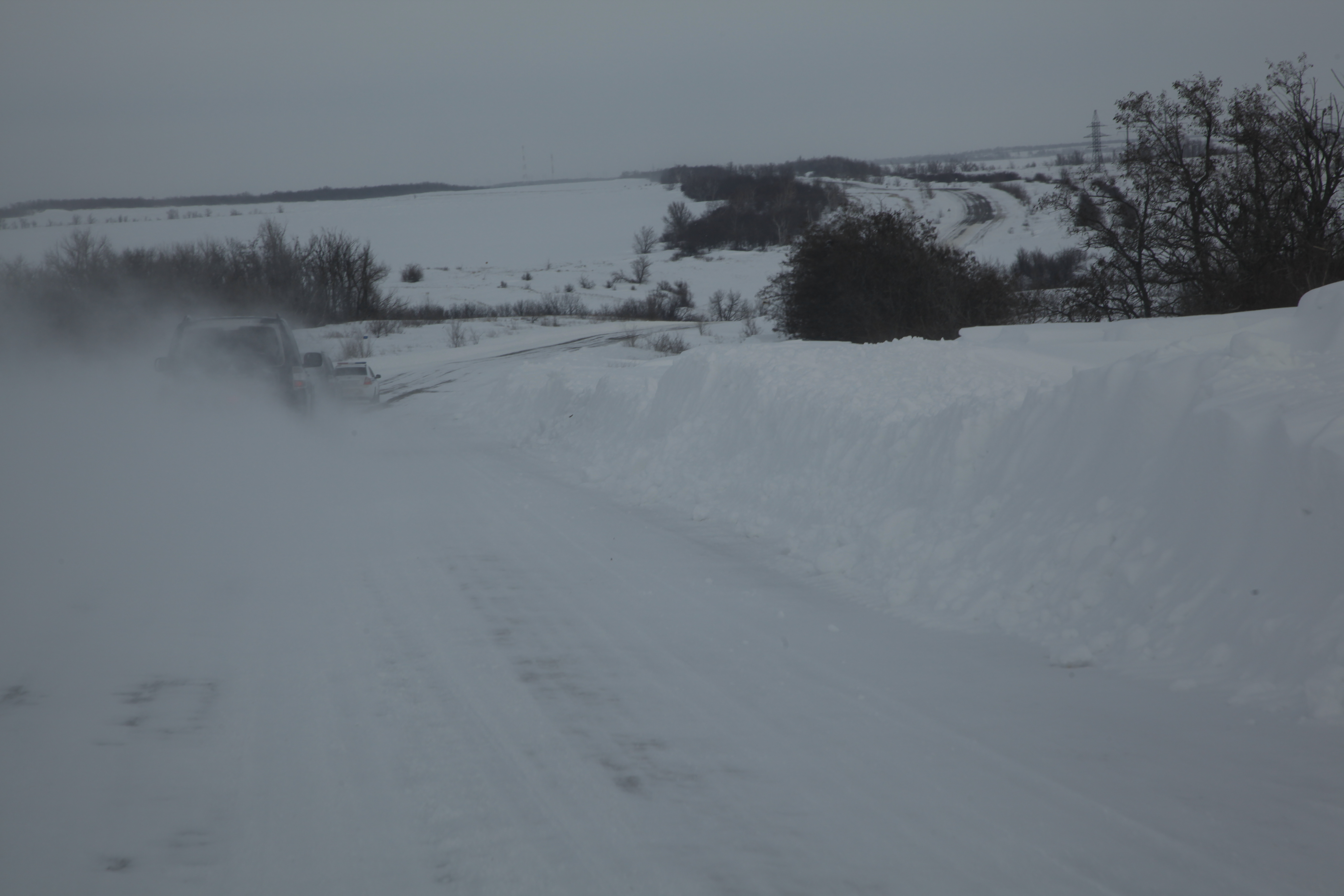
Winter in Volgograd Oblast, Russia

- Russia – European Russia experienced widespread subzero cold. The Ministry of Health and Social Development stated on February 13, that the cold had killed 215 people since January 1. Astrakhan Oblast saw temperatures down to −33.6 °C (−28.5 °F).

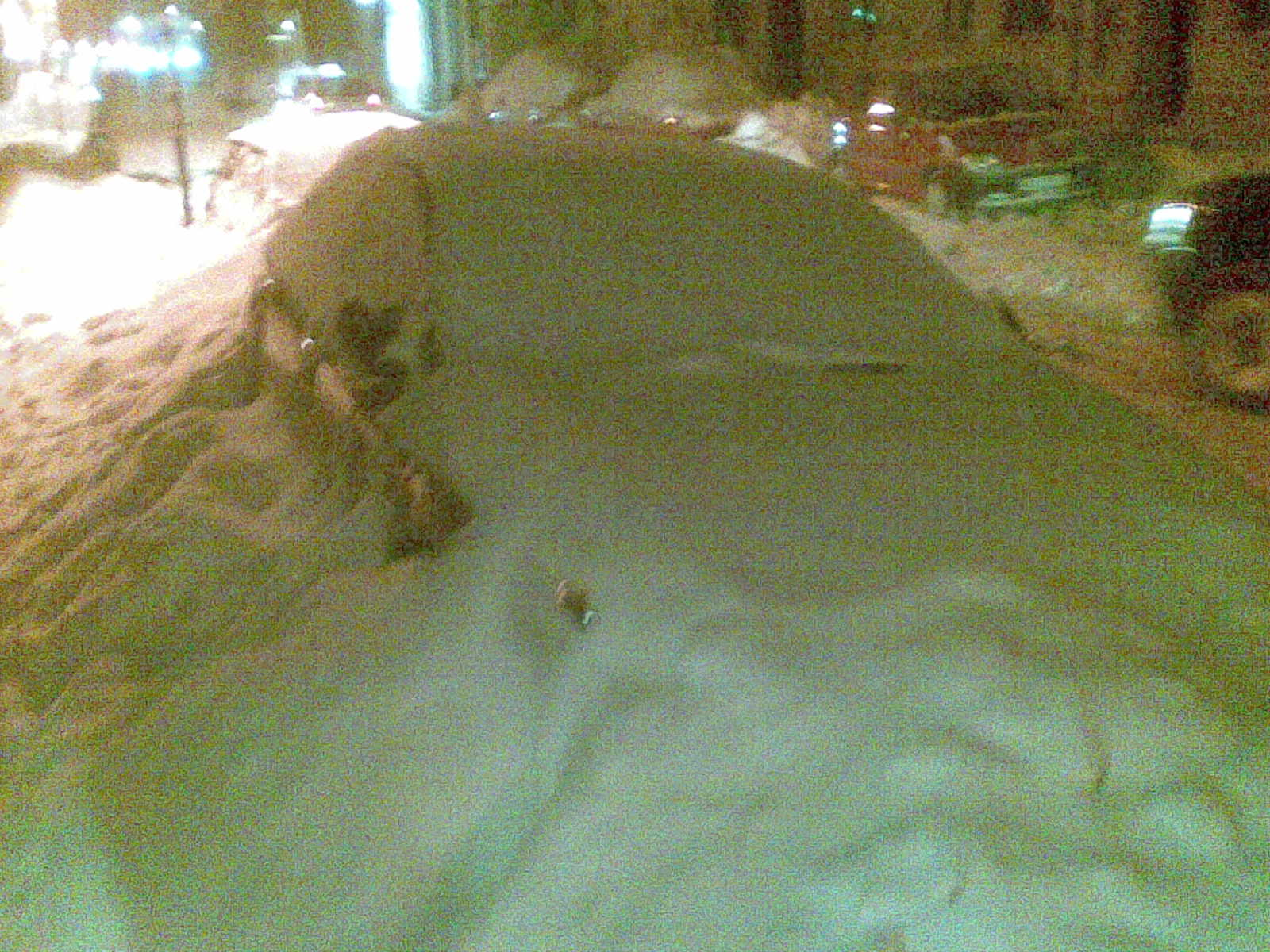
Heavy snowfall in Novi Sad, Serbia.

- Serbia – Sjenica set −32 °C (−26 °F), early on the morning of February 9. In Serbia at least 50,000 villagers have been trapped by heavy snow and blizzards in mountainous areas. Gas supplies are running low. On February 8, electricity consumption broke a record, standing at 162.67 million kWh, so the government mandated a shutdown of all non-essential industries and decorative lightning. The death toll has risen to 20.
- Spain – Palma de Mallorca registered the most important snow episode since 1956. In Catalonia – Heavy snowfall and winds of 175 km/h (109 mph) were reported in Portbou.
- Turkey – On January 31, heavy snow blanketed Istanbul. 102 flights were cancelled at Atatürk International Airport. Nearly 140,000 people made homeless by the 2011 Van earthquake, were reported as struggling to cope with temperatures of −34 °C (−29 °F) and over 30 centimetres of snow.
- Ukraine – More than 100 homeless people have died as temperatures dropped as low as −35 °C (−31 °F). Gas supplies were running low. The cold led to more than 600 people being treated for frostbite and hypothermia within three days, according to officials. Nearly 24,000 people sought shelter during the same three days, the BBC reported. In western Ukraine, Rivne and Ivano-Frankivsk dipped to −28 °C (−18 °F). Ukrainian health officials stated (on February 16) 151 people had died because of the cold, with alcohol regularly a contributing factor, the highest number in Europe.
- United Kingdom – The Met Office issued a severe weather warning as heavy snow fell across much of the country on February 4, disrupting roads and flights. More heavy snow fell overnight in England on February 9–10. On the night of February 10–11, the temperature in Chesham, Buckinghamshire, England fell to −18.3 °C (−0.9 °F).

=== Africa ===
- Algeria – The north of the country awoke to a blanket of snow, 28 of 48 departments of the country have had snow, including Algiers and even parts of Sahara Desert. Snow covered Algerian lower cities at least for several days, while higher cities like Sétif (1100 m AMSL) were covered by snow for weeks. Sétif registered up to 70 cm (28 in) of snow, while some villages like Bousselam registered up to 2.5 m (98 in). The average temperature at this particular time of year is 9 °C (48 °F).

As of February 9, more than 80 people had died because of the cold wave (Forty-four people died during the first week of the cold wave); thirty of them were killed in car accidents caused by icy roads, and 14 died from asphyxiation due to gas fumes.

The following cities recorded snowfall:

- Ain Sefra: 4–6, February 8, 2012
- Algiers: February 4–5, 2012
- Batna: February 3–7, 2012
- Béjaïa: February 4–5, 2012
- Blida
- Bordj Bou Arréridj: January 30, 2012; 4–7, February 9, 11, 13–14, 2012
- Bouira
- Boumerdes
- Constantine: 3–9, February 11–14, 2012
- Djelfa: February 3–5, 2012
- El Bayadh: January 29–30, 2012; 3–8, 11–13, February 21–22, 2012
- El Kheiter: 3–5, February 12, 2012
- Jijel: February 4, 2012
- Mila
- Miliana: January 29–30, 2012; 3–8, February 12–14, 2012
- Médéa: January 30–31, 2012; 3–6, 8–9, 11, 13–15, February 21–22, 2012
- Naâma: 3–6, February 8, 2012
- Oum El Bouaghi: January 30, 2012; February 4–9, 2012
- Sétif: January 29–31, 2012; 3–9, 11–15, February 21–22, 2012
- Souk Ahras: January 30, 2012; 3–8, 11–12, 14, February 16, 2012
- Tébessa: January 29–30, 2012; 3–7, February 11–12, 2012
- Tiaret: 3–5, 8, 11, 13–14, February 22, 2012
- Tipaza
- Tizi-Ouzou: 3–5, 7, February 13, 2012

- Tunisia – Snowfalls were recorded in Gabès.
- Libya – On February 6, snow fell in Gharyan, Ghadames and Al-Bayda; meanwhile small hail blanketed Tripoli, where people confused it with snow, which is a very rare event.

=== Asia ===
- Armenia – Zvartnots and Shirak international airports are closed due to heavy snowfall.
- Azerbaijan – On February 8, temperatures in Baku dropped to −14 °C (7 °F), breaking a 42-year-old record. Heydar Aliyev International Airport in Baku also suffered a serious problems and had to cancel some flights.
- Georgia – On February 7, Georgian press reported that the country was experiencing the coldest winter in nearly 50 years, with important water bodies, such as Mtkvari and Tbilisi sea freezing over.

=== Minimum Temperatures measured during the cold-wave ===
- Finland: -42.7°C (6 February)
- Ukraine: -35.0°C (3 February)
- Belarus: -34.3°C (12 February)
- Estonia: -35.0°C (5 February)
- Denmark: -25.9°C (5 February)
- Italy: -23.9°C (7 February)
- Greece: -25.1°C (10 February)
- Malta: -2.4°C (8 February)
- Netherlands: -22.9°C (4 February)
- Serbia: -32.0°C (9 February)
- Turkey: -34.0°C (9 February)
- United Kingdom: -18.3°C (11 February)
- Azerbaijan: -14.0°C (8 February)

== See also ==
- Cyclone Julia
