= Explosive cyclogenesis =

Rapidly deepening extratropical cyclonic low-pressure area

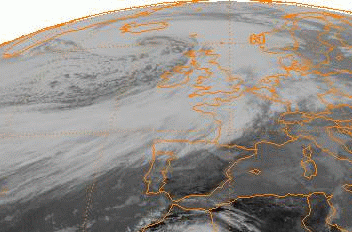
The Braer Storm of January 1993 explosively deepened to a record low of 913 mbar (hPa)

Explosive cyclogenesis (also referred to as a weather bomb, meteorological bomb, explosive development, bomb cyclone, or bombogenesis) is the rapid deepening of an extratropical cyclonic low-pressure area. The change in pressure needed to classify something as explosive cyclogenesis is latitude dependent. For example, at 60° latitude, explosive cyclogenesis occurs if the central pressure decreases by 24 millibars (0.71 inHg) or more in 24 hours. This is a predominantly maritime, winter event, but also occurs in continental settings. This process is the extratropical equivalent of the tropical rapid deepening. Although their cyclogenesis is entirely different from that of tropical cyclones, bomb cyclones can produce winds of 74 to 95 mph (120 to 155 km/h), the same order as the first categories of the Saffir–Simpson scale, and yield heavy precipitation. Even though only a minority of bomb cyclones become this strong, some weaker ones can also cause significant damage.

== History ==
In the 1940s and 1950s, meteorologists of the Bergen School of Meteorology began informally calling some storms that grew over the sea "bombs" because they developed with a great ferocity rarely seen over land.

By the 1970s, the terms "explosive cyclogenesis" and even "meteorological bombs" were being used by MIT professor Fred Sanders (building on work from the 1950s by Tor Bergeron), who brought the term into common usage in a 1980 article published to the Monthly Weather Review. In the article, Sanders and his colleague John Gyakum defined a "bomb" as an extratropical cyclone that deepens by at least (24 sin φ / sin 60°) mb in 24 hours, where φ represents latitude. This is based on the definition, standardised by Bergeron, for explosive development of a cyclone at 60°N as deepening by 24 mb in 24 hours. Sanders and Gyakum noted that an equivalent intensification is dependent on latitude: at the poles this would be a drop in pressure of 28 mb/24 hours, while at 25 degrees latitude it would be only 12 mb/24 hours. All these rates qualify for what Sanders and Gyakum called "1 bergeron". Sanders' and Gyakum's 1980 definition, which is used in the American Meteorological Society's Glossary of Meteorology, said that the "bomb" was "predominantly" a "maritime, cold season event".

In early 2014 in the North Atlantic, fourteen wind events out of twenty that had reached hurricane-force, underwent bombogenesis, the process that creates a bomb cyclone, according to National Oceanic and Atmospheric Administration (NOAA). NOAA said that bombogenesis "occurs when a midlatitude cyclone rapidly intensifies, dropping at least 24 millibars over 24 hours."

== Formation ==
Baroclinic instability has been cited as one of the principal mechanisms for the development of most explosively deepening cyclones. However, the relative roles of baroclinic and diabatic processes in explosive deepening of extratropical cyclones have been subject to debate (citing case studies) for a long time. Other factors include:

- The relative position of a 500-hPa trough and thickness patterns.
- Deep tropospheric frontogenetic processes which happen both upstream and downstream of the surface low.
- The influence of air–sea interaction.
- Latent heat release.

=== Regions and motion ===
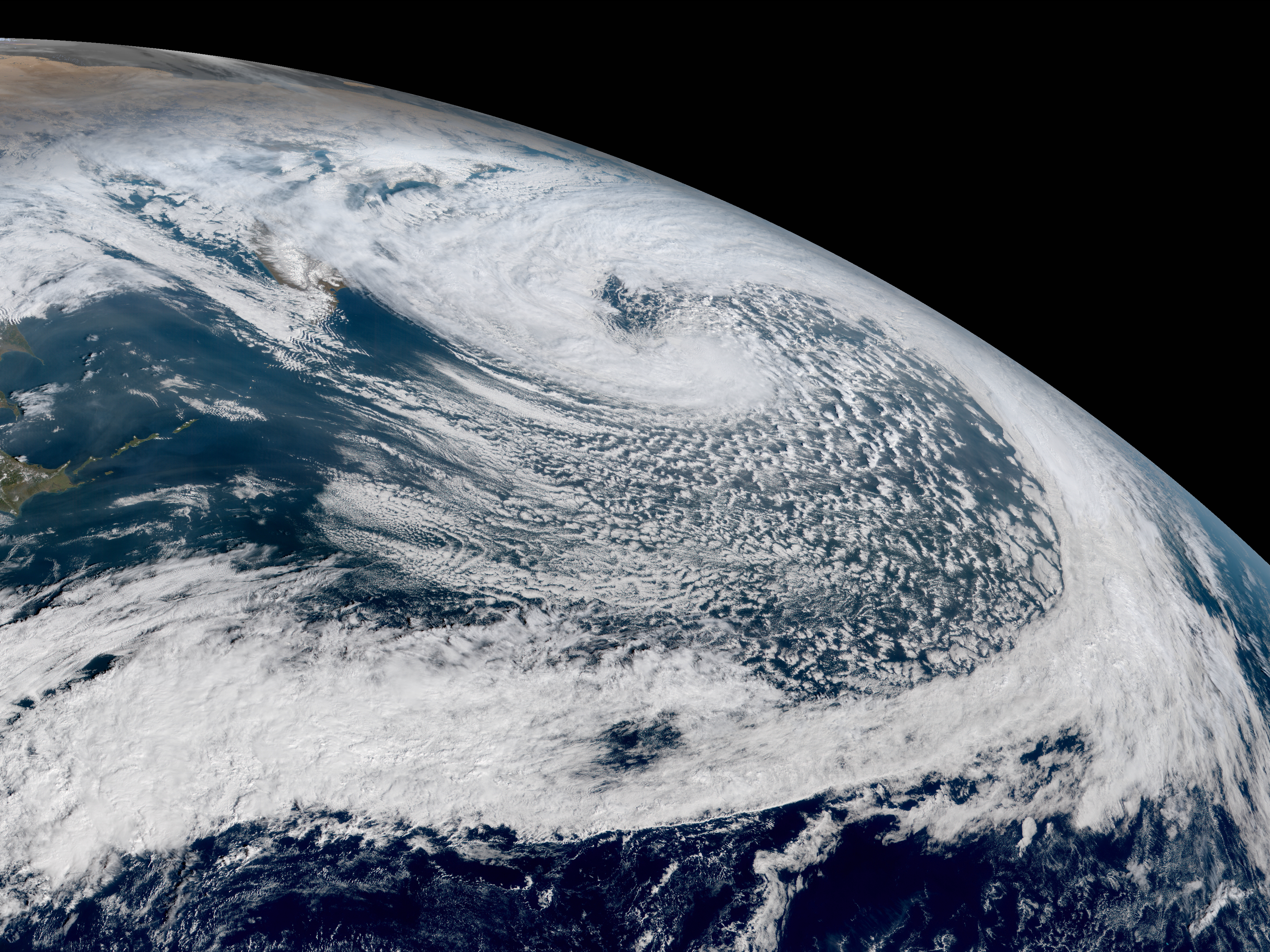
Absorbing the remnants of a powerful tropical cyclone can trigger explosive cyclogenesis

The four most active regions where extratropical explosive cyclogenesis occurs in the world are the Northwest Pacific, the North Atlantic, the Southwest Pacific, and the South Atlantic.

In the Northern Hemisphere the maximum frequency of explosively deepening cyclones is found within or to the north of the Atlantic Gulf Stream, the Kuroshio Current in the western Pacific, and in the eastern Pacific. In the Southern Hemisphere, most bomb cyclones develop in the mid-latitudes and migrate to the southeast, are found in the Australian east coast lows above the East Australian Current, which shows the importance of air-sea interaction in initiating and rapidly developing extratropical cyclones. An equivalent number of bomb cyclones are also observed east of the Rio de la Plata, in South America, forming mainly between the winter and spring seasons.

Explosively deepening cyclones south of 50°S often show equator-ward movement, in contrast with the poleward motion of most Northern Hemisphere bombs. Over the year, 45 cyclones on average in the Northern Hemisphere and 26 in the Southern Hemisphere develop explosively, mostly in the respective hemisphere's winter time. Less seasonality has been noticed in bomb cyclogenesis occurrences in the Southern Hemisphere.

== Other uses of "weather bomb" ==
The term "weather bomb" is popularly used in New Zealand to describe dramatic or destructive weather events. Rarely are the events actual instances of explosive cyclogenesis, as the rapid deepening of low pressure areas is rare around New Zealand. This use of "bomb" may lead to confusion with the more strictly defined meteorological term. In Japan, the term bomb cyclone (爆弾低気圧, bakudan teikiatsu) is used both academically and commonly to refer to an extratropical cyclone which meets the meteorological "bomb" conditions.

The term "bomb" may be somewhat controversial. When European researchers protested that it was a rather warlike term, Fred Sanders, the coauthor of the paper which introduced the meteorological usage quipped: "So why are you using the term 'front'?"

== See also ==
- Cyclogenesis, extratropical cyclones
- Extratropical cyclone, formation
- Notable non-tropical pressures over the North Atlantic
- Superstorm
