= List of atmospheric pressure records in Europe =

The following is a list of atmospheric pressure records in Europe and the extratropical Northern Atlantic. (It does not include localised events, such as those that occur in tornados.)

Extreme pressure values in Europe show both seasonal and geographical differentiation. The greatest pressure extremes occur in winter (January), with the deepest lows occurring to the northwest of the continent, and a diminishing influence of low pressure to the southeast towards Central Europe and Southeast Europe. This is related to the main cyclonic centre of the Icelandic Low, and the North Atlantic extratropical storm track, close to which have been observed some of the lowest atmospheric pressures of the Northern Hemisphere outside the tropics. Extreme high values are favoured over the north east of Europe where intense cold and long winter nights lead to radiative cooling of the air column, causing sinking air reinforcing the development of the highest pressures. Other influences include the semi-permanent Azores High and Siberian High.

== Land-based observations in Europe ==
For comparison, the standard atmospheric pressure at sea level is 1013.25 hPa. This is the average pressure at sea level under calm, stable conditions.

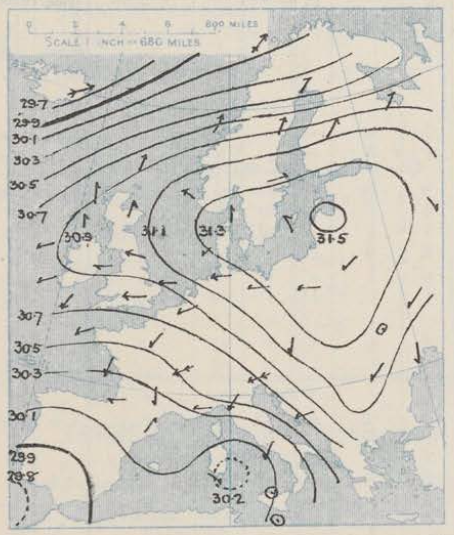
Met Office daily weather report supplementary chart of barometer over Europe on 24 January 1907, for 8 am 23 January with a high of 31.5 inches of mercury (1,070 hPa) over Latvia

Land-based records for Europe:

- Highest observed air pressure record:

- 22–23 January 1907 in Pärnu, Estonia and Riga, Latvia at 1067.1 hPa reported in peer-reviewed literature.

Other high values have been reported:

- 23 January 1907 in Riga at 1068.7 hPa, this value is from a student generated report from the Free University of Berlin Adopt a Vortex scheme. (supported with a 1068 hPa pressure reported in a Danish Meteorological Society publication.)
- 17 February 1954 in northern Russia >1060 hPa, This high is claimed to have a pressure over 1070 hPa by a Free University of Berlin student generated report.
- 16 February 1956, northern Urals 1070 hPa mentioned in student generated reports from FUB. 1067 hPa in another student report from FUB. Others give a figure for this high of 1065 mslp. An isobar of 1072 over Russia features on the Met Office Daily Weather Report 16 February 1956 centred about the town of Vorkuta, Komi Republic.
- 31 January 2012 station Khoseda-Khard directly west of Urals a value of 1068.3 hPa, also reported by SMHI, from a high pressure area named "Cooper/Dieter" by the Free University of Berlin in January 2012 which brought the Early 2012 European cold wave.

Pressure is thought to have risen above 1060 hPa in Europe on only 12 occasions between 1871 and 2010, in the years 1893, 1899, 1907, 1915, 1920, 1938, 1944, 1946, 1956, 1972, 1995 and 2008. To this list might also be included high pressure anticyclones in 1954 and 2012 (see above), and 1869. The most notable high in Europe peaked in January 1907. This was an unusual development that brought high pressure to the west, and holds the officially-recognised record across multiple countries from Scandinavia to Central Europe (Denmark, Norway, Sweden, Finland, Estonia, Latvia, Germany, Czech Republic, Slovakia, Hungary).

- Lowest air pressure:

- 2 December 1929 at Stórhöfði peninsula, Heimaey southwest Iceland 920 hPa.

Another value reported:

- 6–7 January 1839, recorded at Sumburgh Head, Shetland during the Night of the big wind storm 27.25 inches of mercury (922.8 hPa) this value is from non-standardised equipment, and is not fully supported by values at neighbouring stations (unknown if corrected for MSLP). The conversion to hPa above assumes an Inch of mercury at 0 °F = 3376.85 Pa, if value assumes inHg at 60 °F = 3376.38 Pa the value could be as low as 920.2 hPa.

== Northern Europe ==
=== Iceland ===
Note: Iceland is a sparsely populated country with a very limited number of weather stations compared to its area. Therefore the vast majority of extreme pressure events will not have been recorded.

- Highest air pressure: 3 January 1841, Reykjavik 1058.0 hPa.
- Lowest air pressure: 2 December 1929 at Stórhöfði peninsula, Heimaey 920 hPa.

==== Iceland monthly maximum figures for atmospheric pressure ====
Monthly maximum figures for atmospheric pressure in Iceland (Based on Jónsson)
Month	Date	Location	Pressure (hPa)	ref	Notes
January	3 January 1841	Reykjavik	1058.0		Calibrated to 1058.5 in some publications.
February	14 February 1892	Akureyri and Stykkishólmur	1051.8		
March	6 March 1883	Vestmannaey settlement	1051.7		
April	16 April 1991	Egilsstaðir	1050.8		
May	18 May 1894	Akureyri	1045.0		
June	11 June 2019	Reykjavík Airport	1040.6		Previously 21 June 1939 Stykkishólmur, 1040.4 hPa.
July	3 July 1917	Stykkishólmur	1034.3		
August	31 August 2021	Önundarhorn	1036.3		An unofficial value, 28 August 1869 Stykkishólmur, 1036.7 hPa
September	28 September 1983	Akureyri	1038.3		
October	26 October 2018	Gjögur Airport	1045.9		Previously 20 October 1885 at Akureyri and 26 October 1919 at Ísafjörður (1919): 1044.5 hPa
November	24 November 2005	Bolungarvík	1048.0		
December	16 December 1917	Stykkishólmur	1054.2		

==== Iceland list of atmospheric pressure over 1050 hPa ====
High pressure in Iceland has exceeded 1050 hPa on 5 recorded occasions in the 19th century, 4 recorded occasions in the 20th century and 2 in the 21st century.

Atmospheric pressure exceeding 1050 hPa recorded in Iceland.
Date	Location	Pressure (hPa)	Notes
23 December 1836	Reykjavík	1050.9	
3 January 1841	Reykjavík	1058.0	
11 December 1846	Reykjavík	1051.7	10 December Stykkishólmur 1052.6 hPa.
6 March 1883	Stykkishólmur	1050.7	
12 January 1890	Akureyri	1051.6	
26 February 1890	Stykkishólmur	1050.0	
14 January 1891	Westman Isles	1051.1	
14 February 1892	Akureyri and Stykkishólmur	1051.8	
16 December 1917	Stykkishólmur	1054.2	
26 February 1962	Akureyri	1051.7	
17 January 1977	Galtarviti, Keflavík	1051.1	
14–15 April 1991	Several stations	1050	
25–26 February 2006	Several stations	1050	
28 March 2020	Hjarðarland	1050.5	named "Keywan" by FUB.

Climatic Research Unit Emulate data 1874–2002, also gives values on 10 March 1887 at Stykkishólmur 1052.43 hPa and also 9 January 1977 at the same location 1050.47 hPa. (Note: CRU Emulate data are adjusted to represent the 24 hour station mean.)

==== Iceland monthly minimum figures for atmospheric pressure ====
Monthly minimum figures for atmospheric pressure in Iceland
Month	Date	Location	Pressure (hPa)	ref	Notes
January	3 January 1933	Westman Isles	923.9		
February	4 February 1824	Reykjavik	923.8		
March	4 March 1913	Reykjavik	934.6		
April	11 April 1990	Bergstöðum in Skagafjörður	951.0		
May	13 May 1956	Stórhöfði	967.3		
June	11 June 1983	Stórhöfði	959.6		958.0 offshore low.
July	22 July 2012	Westman Isles	972.4		
August	27 August 1927	Hólar in Hornafjörður	960.9		
September	13 September 1906	SW Iceland	~942		*Possible record
October	14 October 2026	(Provisional: Fagurhólsmýri )	(934.6)		Previously 19 October 1963 Stórhöfði 938.4
December	2 December 1929	Stórhöfði	920		

In July the pressure in Iceland has only dropped below 975 hPa or lower three times over the entire record extending back to the 1820s. These cases were 974.1 hPa in Stykkishólmur on 18 July 1901, 974.3 hPa in Stykkishólmur on 19 July 1923 and 975.0 hPa in Reykjavík 11 July 1912.—to which can be added 22 July 2012, with 972.4 hPa reported on the Westman Isles, becoming the new national record for the month.

A recent low pressure on 30 December 2015 was recorded at Kirkjubaejarklaustur (associated with an area of low pressure known as Eckard/Frank) at 930.2 hPa, the lowest pressure recorded on land in Iceland since 1989.

=== Faroe Islands ===
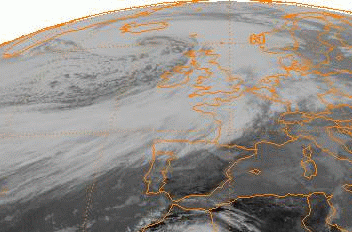
METEOSAT satellite image of the Braer Storm of January 1993 near peak intensity on January 10, 1993

The Danish Meteorological Institute report record atmospheric pressure for the Faroe Islands (since 1961) as:

- Highest air pressure: 13 December 1995, Tórshavn and 28 March 2020 Vágar Airport, 1048.9 hPa.

- Lowest air pressure: 11 January 1993, Vágar Airport during the Braer Storm 930.3 hPa.

Climatic Research Unit Emulate data 1874–2002 give 3 dates when pressure exceeded 1050 hPa in Tórshavn.

Table of atmospheric pressure in Tórshavn exceeding 1050 hPa.
Date	Pressure (hPa)
8 January 1896	1052.64
1 February 1902	1052.43
21 February 1944	1050.33

=== Ireland ===
Met Éireann list the following national records for atmospheric pressure:

- Highest air pressure: 28 January 1905, Valentia Island, Co.Kerry 1051.9 hPa.
- Lowest air pressure: 28 November 1838, Limerick 931.2 hPa.

==== Ireland monthly maximum figures for atmospheric pressure ====
Monthly maximum figures for atmospheric pressure in Ireland Met Éireann.
Month	Date	Location	Pressure (hPa)	Notes
January	28 January 1905	Valentia, Co. Kerry	1051.9	
February	7 February 1964	Kilkenny and Mullingar	1049.1	
March	29 March 2020	Malin Head	1051.2	*Previously: 13 March 1900, Valentia 1047.1.
April	26 April 1948	Shannon Airport	1043.4	
May	12 May 2012	Cork Airport	1042.4	An alternate value on 12 May 2012 at Valentia observatory of 1043.0 hPa has also been reported.
June	14 June 1959	Clones, Co Monaghan	1043.1	
July	1 July 1933	Malin Head	1037.9	
August	17 August 1940	Valentia	1036.0	
September	10 and 11 September 2009	Malin Head	1041.3	
September	24 September 2018	Sherkin Island and Cork Airport	1041.3	
October	22 October 2018	Sherkin Island	1043.8	*Previously 31 October 1959 Malin Head 1043.0
November	10 November 1999	Ireland West Airport	1046.0	
December	24 December 1926	Malin Head	1049.5	

==== Ireland monthly minimum figures for atmospheric pressure ====
Monthly minimum figures for atmospheric pressure in Ireland Met Éireann.
Month	Date	Location	Pressure (hPa)	Notes
January	26 January 1884	Markree Castle, Sligo	936.6	
February	4 February 1951	Midleton, Co. Cork	942.3	
March	10 March 2008	Mace Head, Galway	950.0	(named Johanna by FUB)
April	1 April 1948	Malin Head, Co. Donegal	952.9	
May	10 May 1983	Belmullet, Co. Mayo	970.3	
June	8 June 1843	Phoenix Park, Dublin	975.3	
July	25 July 1988	Belmullet, Co. Mayo	978.0	
August	20 August 2020	Athenry, Galway	966.4	(Storm Ellen) *Previously 14 August 1959 Belmullet, Co. Mayo 967.8
September	21 September 1953	Claremorris, Co. Mayo	957.1	
October	28 October 2004	Valentia	957.5	(named Carolin by FUB)
November	28 November 1838	Limerick	931.2	
December	17 December 1989	Cork Airport	942.8	

=== Isle of Man ===
1957–2005

- Highest air pressure: 26 January 1992, Ronaldsway 1047.8 hPa.
- Lowest air pressure: 1 December 1966, Ronaldsway 946.5 hPa.

An earlier value on 8 December 1886, Cronkbourne 27.555 inches of mercury (933.1 hPa).

=== United Kingdom ===
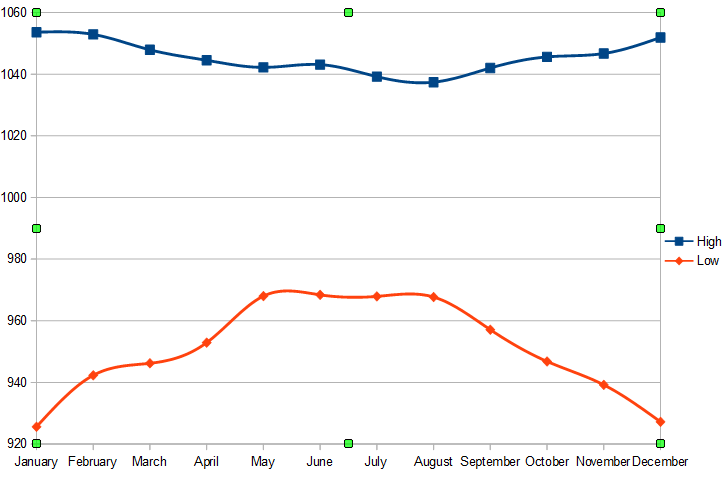
Graph of minimum and maximum monthly air pressure values in the UK.

For the United Kingdom, the Met Office record the record figures for atmospheric pressure (which are nominally since 1870) as:

- Highest air pressure: 31 January 1902, Aberdeen Scotland 1053.6 hPa.
- Lowest air pressure: 26 January 1884, Ochtertyre Scotland 925.6 hPa.

Though the lowest pressure may be second to the Night of the Big Wind low, which saw a value of 27.25 inches of mercury (923 hPa) at Sumburgh Head, Shetland on non-calibrated, non-standard equipment 6–7 January 1839, with the mainland at Cape Wrath reporting an observed pressure of 27.32 inches of mercury (925 hPa).

On 26 January 1884, during the Ochtertyre storm the Ben Nevis summit weather station recorded a low pressure of 784.7 hPa (at high altitude (above 750 m) and not reduced to sea level) this is proposed as being almost certainly the lowest surface pressure ever recorded in the UK, though due to altitude and not being a value reduced to sea level is not considered comparable to the other records presented here.

A low pressure of 914.0 hPa affected the UK during the Braer Storm on 10 January 1993, however this figure is discounted as this reading was not recorded in the UK.

==== Ireland and United Kingdom monthly maximum figures for atmospheric pressure ====
Monthly maximum figures for atmospheric pressure UK and Ireland Met Office.
Month	Date	Location	Pressure (hPa)	Alternative and UK only records
January	31 January 1902	Aberdeen Observatory, Aberdeenshire	1053.6†	
February	1 February 1902	Aberdeen Observatory, Aberdeenshire	1052.9	
March	29 March 2020	South Uist, Outer Hebrides	1051.2	Previously 3 March 1990 St Mary's Airport, Isles of Scilly 1047.9 hPa. The value from 9 March 1953 Tynemouth of 1048.6 is thought to be from an erroneous value transcription of 1043.6.
April	11 April 1938	Eskdalemuir, Dumfriesshire	1044.5	
May	16 May 1943	Dublin Airport, Ireland	1042.2	UK value: 1881, Aberdeen, Glasgow and Armagh 1042 hPa.
June	14 June 1959	Clones Co. Monaghan	1043.1	UK value: 14 June 1959, "Northern Ireland" 1043 hPa (Irish record is within 1 km of UK border). 15 June 1874 Scotland >1040 hPa.
July	16 July 1996	Aboyne, Aberdeenshire	1039.2	
August	31 August 2021	Stornoway, Isle of Lewis	1038.5	Previously Kirkwall, Orkney 25 August 1968 1037.4.
September	11 September 2009	Ballykelly, Co. Londonderry	1042.0	*Previously 19 September 1986 Shawbury, Shropshire 1041.2 hPa.
October	31 October 1956	Dyce, Aberdeenshire	1045.6	
November	10 November 1999	Aviemore, Invernessshire	1046.7	
December	24 December 1926	Wick, Caithness	1051.9	

(† note the value of 1054.7 reported in some literature is an incorrect conversion.)

==== Ireland and United Kingdom list of atmospheric pressure over 1050 hPa ====
List of atmospheric pressures over 1050 hPa in UK and Ireland (likely incomplete)
Date	Location	Pressure (hPa)
24 February 1808	Gordon Castle, Moray Scotland	1050.0
8–9 January 1820	Kinfauns Castle, Perth Scotland	1051.7
9 January 1896	Ochtertyre, Perth Scotland	1053.4
31 January 1902	Aberdeen, Scotland (UK record)	1053.6
28 January 1905	Falmouth, Cornwall	1053.1
23 January 1907	Aberdeen, Scotland	1051.8
24 December 1926	Wick, Scotland	1051.9
26 January 1932	Stonyhurst, Sheffield and Meltham, West Yorkshire	1051.0
16 January 1957	Belmullet, Co Mayo Ireland and Benbecula, Scotland	1050.9
19 January 2020	Mumbles Head, Wales.	1050.5
29 March 2020	South Uist, Scotland.	1051.2

In the period of instrumental measurement the atmospheric pressure has exceeded 1048 hPa somewhere over the United Kingdom and Ireland on 18 occasions. On 10 of these times, the pressure exceeded 1050 hPa. Intense high pressure is usually seen during midwinter with eight of the 10 occasions where 1050 hPa has been exceeded occurring in January.

Pressure values have been recorded to have exceeded 1050 hPa in all areas of the UK and Ireland except south east England, though values close to this are documented from January 1882 and January 1905. To which high pressure in January 2020 saw a value of 1049.6 at Heathrow Airport measured, which is thought to be likely the highest pressure seen in the region with records back to 1692.

==== United Kingdom and Ireland monthly minimum figures for atmospheric pressure ====
Monthly minimum figures for atmospheric pressure UK and Ireland Met Office.
Month	Date	Location	Pressure (hPa)	Alternative and UK only records
January	26 January 1884	Ochtertyre, Perthshire	925.6	Alternative: 6–7 January 1839, Sumburgh Head, Shetland during the Night of the big wind storm 27.25 inches of mercury (922.8 hPa), (value from non-standardised equipment).
February	4 February 1951	Midleton, Co. Cork	942.3	UK value: 9 February 1988, Benbecula 944.0 hPa.
March	9 March 1876	Wick, Caithness	946.2	
April	1 April 1948	Malin Head, Co. Donegal	952.9	UK value: 1 April 1948, The Hebrides 953 hPa.
May	8 May 1943	Sealand, Flintshire (listed as Cheshire)	968.0	
June	28 June 1938	Lerwick, Shetland	968.4	
July	8 July 1964	Sule Skerry, Northern Isles	967.9	
August	14 August 1954	Belmullet, Co. Mayo	967.7	UK value: 30 August 1992, NE Scotland ~972 hPa.
September	21 September 1953	Claremorris, Co. Mayo	957.1	UK value: 16–17 September 1935, "Central England" 960 hPa.
October	14 October 1891	Cawdor Castle, Highland (listed as Nairnshire)	946.8	**Cyclone Oratia, Storm Amy (2025) 947.9hPa, described as the October low pressure record of the UK by the MetOffice.
November	11 November 1877	Monach Lighthouse, Outer Hebrides	939.7	The England and Wales record is 953.3 hPa from Plymouth on 2 November 2023 during storm Ciarán, previously 959.7 hPa from 1916.
December	8 December 1886	Belfast, Antrim	927.2	On the morning of 8 December 1886, the barometer may have fallen as low as 924 hPa over Northern Ireland, although the lowest authenticated value was 927.2 hPa at Belfast at 1330h, close to the centre of the depression.

Cyclone Oratia is estimated to have reached a low of 941 hPa in peer-reviewed literature, though the lowest pressure occurred between Aberdeen and Norway over the North Sea and is not a land-based observation. The lowest land-based reported UK pressure during this storm, of 951.2 hPa, was recorded at RAF Fylingdales.

On 7 September 1995, Scilly Isles, reported a low pressure of 966 hPa. The lowest minimum recorded values for the months May to August lie within 0.5 of 968 hPa.

The 20th century low pressure record in the UK occurred on 20 December 1982 at Sule Skerry: it may have dropped as low as 936 hPa.

==== United Kingdom list of atmospheric pressure below 950 hPa (incomplete) ====
- 1821 December 25, London 27.93 inches of mercury (946 hPa).
- 1839 January 7, Night of the big wind, pressure below 28 inches of mercury (950 hPa) at Inchkeith, Peterhead and Aberdeen.
- 1865 November 22,
- 1865 December 31, Butt of Lewis Lighthouse 27.69 inches of mercury (938 hPa), with a report of 27.63 inches of mercury (936 hPa) from Hoy that is not supported by observation from Cantick head lighthouse on South Walls.
- 1884 January 26, Ochtertyre, record lowest pressure value for the UK.
- 1886 December 8,
- 1982 December 20, Stornoway 937.6 hPa.
- 1989 February 25, Portland, Dorset 948.8.
- 2013 December 24, Cyclone Dirk, Stornoway 936.8 hPa.
- 2020 February 9 Storm Ciara, Kirkwall Airport 945 hPa.
- 2025 January 24, Storm Éowyn, Tiree, 942 hPa.

==== Home nation records ====
Based on Burt (2007) and Met Office.

===== Scotland =====
Same as UK national records.

- Highest: 31 January 1902, Aberdeen Observatory 1053.6 hPa.
- Lowest: 26 January 1884, Ochtertyre Scotland 925.6 hPa.

===== Northern Ireland =====
- High: 29 March 2020, The Northern Irish north coast likely saw a value in the region of ~1051 hPa around Magilligan Point.

29 March 2020, Belfast Aldergrove 1049.8 hPa.

- Lowest: 8 December 1886, in Belfast 927.2 hPa. (A reading of 922.5 mbar (corrected to MSL) was reported from Omagh in Co. Tyrone (Harding 1887) the graduation and calibration of the barometer were not considered satisfactory enough “to quote the reading as trustworthy”, the storm minimum over the Northern Ireland was thought to be close to 924 mbar.)

===== Wales =====
- Highest: 19 January 2020, Mumbles Head, West Glamorgan 1050.5 hPa.

Previously: 28 January 1905, Pembroke, 1050.1 hPa.

- Lowest: 22 November 1865, Dolgellau, North Wales 944.8 hPa.

===== England =====
- Highest: 28 January 1905, Falmouth, Cornwall 31.097 inches of mercury (1,053.1 hPa).
- Lowest: 8 December 1886, Stonyhurst in Lancashire, where the barometer fell to 940.4 hPa.

Alt. 8 December 1886, Newton Reigny in Cumbria, 27.556 inches of mercury (933.2 hPa).

=== Norway ===
Yr.no the joint venture between the Norwegian Broadcasting Corporation and the Norwegian Meteorological Institute give the national pressure records as:

- Highest air pressure: 23 January 1907, Dalen, Telemark 1 061.3 hPa.
- Lowest air pressure: 20 February 1907, at Skudeneshavn on the island of Karmøy, Rogaland 938.5 hPa.

(formerly listed as 27 January 1907, Bergen 936 hPa.)

A value of 702.0 mm Hg at Bergen Lungegård Hospital on January 27, 1884 (935.8 hPa) is also reported, which is likely to be from the same low as the UK record from Ochtertyre the previous day. Other sources give a pressure value of 939.8 hPa or 939.7 hPa in Bergen on 27 January 1884.

Both records in same winter as each other and those of Denmark.

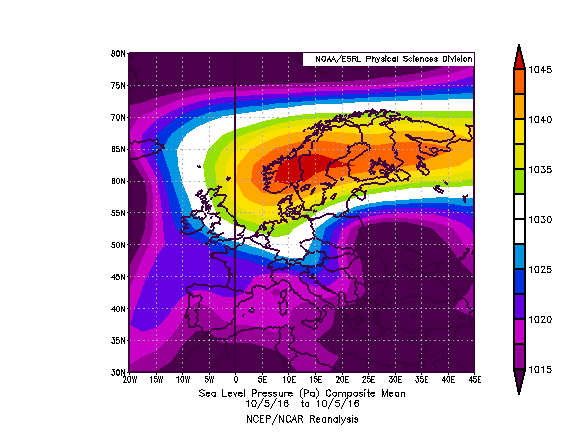
Average pressure 5 October 2016 from high "Peter"

Monthly maximum figures for atmospheric pressure Norway
Month	Date	Location	Pressure (hPa)	ref	Notes
February	28 February 2018	Tynset, Hedmark	1061.0		
October	5 October 2016	Otta	1054.3		*Previously 14 October 1896, Dalen, Telemark, 1044.0 hPa.

Norway uses a different formula for correction of air pressure to sea level than Sweden. This affects the result for high altitude stations in cold weather.

=== Denmark ===
The Danish Meteorological Institute report record barometric pressure for Denmark (since 1874) as:

- Highest air pressure: 23 January 1907, Skagen and Copenhagen 1062.2 hPa.
- Lowest air pressure: 20 February 1907, Skagen 943.5 hPa.

Danish records both occurred within a month during the same winter, and same winter as Norwegian records.

==== Denmark monthly maximum figures for atmospheric pressure ====
Monthly maximum figures for atmospheric pressure Denmark (Italic text based on 1961–1990 data only)
Month	Date	Location	pressure hPa	ref	Notes
January	23 January 1907	Skagen and Copenhagen	1062.2		
February	7 February 2012	Thyborøn	1050.3		2012 value exceeds 1961–1990 maximum.
March	19 March 2022	Tirstrup	1051.6 tbc.		12 March 1880, Hammer Odde 1049.4 hPa.
April	16 April 1962	Skagen	1040.6		
May	3 May 1990	Christiansø Lighthouse	1041.6		
June	7 June 1962	Skagen	1038.8		
July	16 July 1972	Christiansø Lighthouse	1031.9		
August	18 August 1966	Christiansø Lighthouse	1032.8		
September	29 September 2015	Østerbro	1042.2		*Previously 18 September 1904, Hammer Odde Lighthouse 1038.8 hPa. (or 29 September 1970, Bornholm Airport 1040.0 hPa)
October	5 October 2016	Skagen	1045.5		*Previously 6 October 1877, Hammer Odde Lighthouse 1044.7 hPa.
November	18 November 1985	Skagen	1052.4		
December	24 December 1962	Fornæs Lighthouse and Værløse Air Base	1051.6		

==== Denmark list of barometric pressure over 1050 hPa ====
Above 1050 hPa
Date	Location	Pressure (hPa)	Notes
19 March 2022			
7 February 2012	Thyborøn	1050.3	8 February 2012 North Jutland >1050 hPa.
18 November 1985	Thyborøn	1050.3	or 1052.5 Skagen.
1962	Denmark	1052	
23 January 1907	Skagen	1062.2	
31 January—1 February 1902	Skagen and Fanø	1050	1056.1

==== Denmark monthly minimum figures for atmospheric pressure ====
Monthly minimum figures for atmospheric pressure Denmark (Italic text based on 1961–1990 data only)
Month	Date	Location	Pressure (hPa)	ref	Notes
January	14 January 1984	Skagen	950.2		
February	20 February 1907	Skagen	943.9		
March	25 March 1986	Skrydstrup Airport	961.4		18 March 2007 Skagen 958.6 hPa.
April	21 April 1967	Skagen	975.7		April 1876, 966.0
May	28 May 1972	Thyborøn	985.1		6 May 1997 Skagen 981.3 hPa.
June	6 June 1977	Skagen	985.1		
July	30 July 1965	Skagen	982.5		
August	6 August 1985	Thyborøn	980.1		
September	22 September 1990	Thyborøn	970.1		
October	18 October 1967	Tirstrup	966.7		During the passage of the October storm (Lena)
November	6 November 1985	Aalborg Airport	953.0		
December	10 December 1965	Thyborøn	955.2		Cyclone Anatol 3 December 1999 saw a pressure over Denmark of ~951 hPa.

=== Sweden ===
The Swedish Meteorological and Hydrological Institute give the nation's barometric records as:

- Highest air pressure: 23 January 1907 in Kalmar and Visby 1063.7 hPa.
- Lowest air pressure: 6 December 1895 Härnösand 938.4 hPa.

==== Sweden monthly maximum figures for atmospheric pressure ====
Monthly maximum figures for atmospheric pressure Sweden
Month	Date	Location	Pressure (hPa)	ref	Notes
January	23 January 1907	Kalmar and Visby	1063.7		
February	1 February 2012	Haparanda	1058.0		
March	1 March 1971	Svartbyn-Överkalix	1055.7		
April	15 April 1860	Uppsala	1047.1		
May	7 May 1893	Umeå	1048.0		
June	3 June 1979	Sveg	1044.8		
July	28 July 1963	Sveg and Särna	1035.6		
August	25 August 1968	Riksgränsen	1038.8		
September	28 September 2017	Åsele and Lycksele	1044.1		*Previously 29 September 2015, Hagshult (Småland) 1042.9 hPa. The previous record was from 16 September 1903, Sveg 1042.0 hPa.
October	4 October 2016	Sveg	1050.7		*Previously 14 October 1896, Stockholm 1048.6 hPa.
November	18 November 1985	Malung and Rännberg-Östmark, Värmland.	1056.0		
December	15 December 1946	Sveg	1059.2		

==== Sweden monthly minimum figures for atmospheric pressure ====
Monthly minimum figures for atmospheric pressure Sweden
Month	Date	Location	Pressure (hPa)	ref
January	30 January 2000	Krångede, Jämtland	946.2	
February	27 February 1990	Understen, Uppland	940.5	
March	8 March 1920	Abisko, Lapland	948.3	
April	6 April 1943	Gäddede, Jämtland	960.3	
May	12 May 1898	Karlstad	971.3	
June	29 June 1938	Storlien	976.2	
July	9 July 1931	Ulricehamn	977.1	
August	6 August 1941	Måseskär	975.7	
September	29 September 1956	Klutmark, Västerbotten	960.9	
October	19 October 1970	Edsbyn	954.1	
November	1 November 1921	Holmögadd	948.3	
December	6 December 1895	Härnösand	938.4	

=== Finland ===
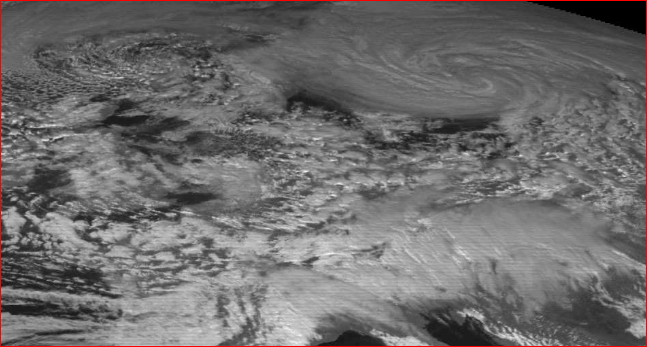
Low Vivian approaching Finland 27 February 1990

According to the Finnish Meteorological Institute:

- Highest air pressure: 22 January 1907, Helsinki 1066 hPa.
- Lowest air pressure: 27 February 1990 Kuuskajaskari, Rauma 940 hPa.

Though a reported low value by Weather Underground weather historian Christopher Burt on 1 March 1990 at an unknown location is reported at 939.7 hPa. Helsingin Sanomat report a value at Turku Airport on 28 February 1990 of 939.8 hPa, with the previous record reported as being from 16 December 1982 on Moikpää, in the Kvarken at 942.1 hPa.

=== Baltics ===
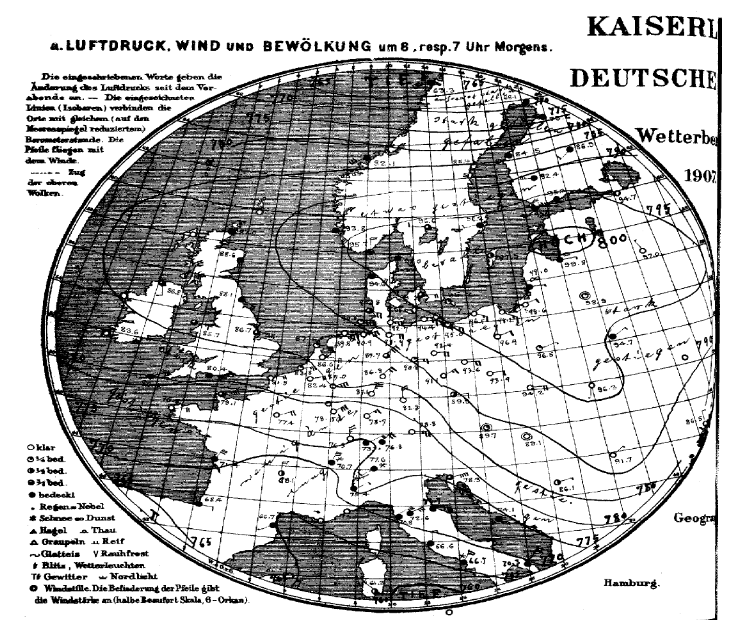
Deutsche Seewarte atmospheric pressure map 23 January 1907

Maximum pressure in Europe 22–23 January 1907 recorded in Pärnu, Estonia and Riga, Latvia at 1067.1 mbar. The Free University of Berlin state the European air pressure record is 23 January 1907 in Riga at 1068.7 hPa.

==== Estonia ====
As reported by the Estonian Weather Service

- Highest air pressure: 23 January 1907, Tallinn 1060.3 hPa.‡

Alt: 21 November 1993, Narva 1057.2 hPa.

- Lowest air pressure: 16 December 1982, Naissaar 947.6 hPa.

16 December 1982 Väike-Maarja 936.0 hPa is a station level value.

‡The Estonian Weather Service report on their website the record maximum observed air pressure in the country as 1060.3 hPa recorded 23 January 1907 in Tallinn. This figure is not supported by NOAA reanalysis charts and the values reported from neighbouring Finland and Latvia probably make this figure an underestimation or error. A possible maximum pressure value for the whole of Europe is thought to have occurred during the 22–23 January 1907 high pressure event with a record set in Pärnu, Estonia and Riga, Latvia at 1067.1 mbar. Though this value is exceeded by the value on 23 January 1907 in Riga reported at 1068.7 hPa by the Free University of Berlin's student generated reports, at which time the pressure is estimated to have reached around 1070 hPa by Yr.no in the Gulf of Riga.

Monthly maximum figures for atmospheric pressure Estonia 2004–Present, based on hourly station observations.
Month	Date	Location	Pressure (hPa)	ref	Notes
January	22 January 2006	Kuusiku	1058.1		January 1907
February	1 February 2012	Narva-Jõesuu	1053.4		
March	16 March 2015	Jõhvi	1052.7		
April	2 April 2004	Kihnu	1037.9		
May	6 May 2006	Kunda	1039.0		
June	1 June 2009	Lääne-Nigula	1037.5		
July	2 July 2006	Võru	1033.6		
August	21 August 2015	Lääne-Nigula	1032.3		
September	28 September 2018	Jõhvi	1043.9		
October	31 October 2015	Võru	1041.6		
November	16 November 2018	Valga	1043.2		21 November 1993 Narva 1057.2.
December	30 December 2015	Valga	1048.0		

Monthly minimum figures for atmospheric pressure Estonia 2004–Present, based on hourly station observations.
Month	Date	Location	Pressure (hPa)	ref	Notes
January	11 January 2005	Ristna	962.6		
February	17 February 2022	Vilsandi	959.6		
March	26 March 2008	Narva-Jõesuu	966.6		
April	5 April 2022	Pakri	965.8		
May	2 May 2019	Kunda	977.1		
June	27 June 2007	Ristna	981.7		
July	9 July 2009	Ristna	986.6		
August	10 August 2005	Kihnu	985.0		
September	14 September 2017	Vilsandi	981.4		
October	21 October 2021	Vilsandi	966.7		
November	23 November 2008	Tiirikoja	951.3		
December	6 December 2013	Vilsandi	966.1		16 December 1982, Naissaar 947.6 hPa

==== Latvia ====
- Highest air pressure: 22–23 January 1907 Liepāja 1065.9 hPa

In the period 1960 to 2014, 16 December 1997 Daugavpils a value of 1055.8 hPa recorded.

- Low air pressure: 13 February 1962 Vidzeme Upland 932.9 hPa (probably a station level reading).

==== Lithuania ====
- Highest air pressure: December 1889 Vilnius 1058.5 hPa
- Lowest air pressure: January 1931 Ukmergė and Dotnuva 951.6 hPa.

23 January 1907 1065.1 hPa. Deutsche Seewarte gives morning readings on 23 January 1907 in Klaipėda (Memel) of 799.0 millimetres of mercury (1,065.2 hPa) and in Vilnius (Wilna) of 798.9 millimetres of mercury (1,065.1 hPa). There is a mention in the Hungarian meteorological journal Időjarás of reaching 800.0 millimetres of mercury (1,066.6 hPa) in Vilnius (Wilna) during the exceptional January 1907 anticyclone, but in the other place the Vilnius value of 799.4 millimetres of mercury (1,065.8 hPa) is reported. According to an article in the German-Austrian expert journal Meteorologische Zeitschrift, on 23 January 1907 at 7 hrs Vilnius (Wilna) reached 799.2 millimetres of mercury (1,065.5 hPa).

==== Kaliningrad/Königsberg ====
- Highest air pressure: 23 January 1907 1064.7 hPa

== Western Europe ==
=== Channel Islands ===
==== Jersey ====
1862–present

- Highest air pressure: 29 January 1905, Jersey 1051.7 hPa.
- Lowest air pressure: 25 February 1989, Jersey 953.8 hPa.

==== Guernsey ====
Guernsey Airport 1960–present.

- Highest air pressure: 20 January 2020, 1049.1 hPa.

Formerly 3 March 1990, 1047.7 hPa.

- Lowest air pressure: 25 February 1989, 952.5 hPa.

==== Alderney ====
- Highest air pressure 20 January 2020, 1049.8 hPa.

=== France ===
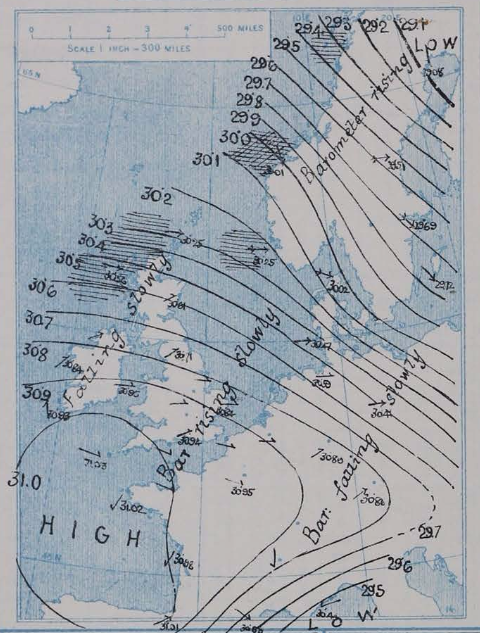
Met Office Daily Weather Report pressure map 29 January 1905

Météo-France figures from 1951–present.

- Highest air pressure: 20 January 2020, Abbeville, Somme 1049.7 hPa

Previously: 3 March 1990, Pointe de Chémoulin, Saint-Nazaire Loire-Atlantique 1048.9 hPa.

- Lowest air pressure: 25 February 1989, Cap de La Hague, Cherbourg 951.8 hPa.

though other listed figures predate Météo-France's records.

- Highest air pressure: 6 February 1821 Paris 1050.4 hPa.
- Lowest air pressure: 25 December 1821 Boulogne sur mer 947.1 hPa.

On 28 January 1905 values of 31.04 inches of mercury (1,051 hPa) in Biarritz, and 31.01 inches of mercury (1,050 hPa) in Brest are listed in the Met Office Daily Weather Report. On the 29 January 1905, the atmospheric pressure reached a value of 1049.3 hPa in Paris.

Monthly maximum figures for atmospheric pressure France
Month	Date	Location	Pressure (hPa)	ref	Notes
January	20 January 2020	Abbeville	1049.7		
February					*Possible 20th Century: February 15, 1934 Cap De La Hague 1,048.2 hPa.
March	3 March 1990	Pointe de Chémoulin, Saint-Nazaire Loire-Atlantique	1048.9 hPa		
May	13 May 2019	Dunkirk	1040.7		
September	25 September 2018	Valenciennes	1040.0		*Previously 19 September 1986 Dunkirk 1038.4

Monthly minimum figures for atmospheric pressure France
Month	Date	Location	Pressure (hPa)	ref	Notes
May	5 May 2004	Cap de la Hague	980.1		
October	16 October 1987	Ushant	948 hPa		

=== Belgium ===
The Belgian Royal Meteorological Institute gives the national record values as:

- Highest air pressure: 20 January 2020, Uccle 1048.3 hPa.

Previously: 27 January 1932, Uccle 1048 hPa.

- Lowest air pressure: 25 February 1989, Blankenberge 954 hPa.

Monthly maximum figures for atmospheric pressure Belgium (since 20th century)
Month	Date	Location	Pressure (hPa)	ref	Notes
January	20 January 2020	Uccle	1048.3		
May	16 May 1943	Uccle	1039.5		
June	6 June 1962	Uccle	1034.9		
September	27 September 1906	Uccle	1037.9		
October	23 October 1958	Uccle	1039.5		

Monthly minimum figures for atmospheric pressure Belgium (since 20th century)
Month	Date	Location	Pressure (hPa)	ref	Notes
February	25 February 1989	Uccle	956.8		*Alt On 25 February 1989 a value reported at Blankenberge of 954 hPa.
August	24 August 1956	Uccle	980		
September	11 September 1903	Uccle	976.8		
October	10 October 1964	Uccle	971.0		
November	29 November 1965	Uccle	967		

=== Luxembourg ===
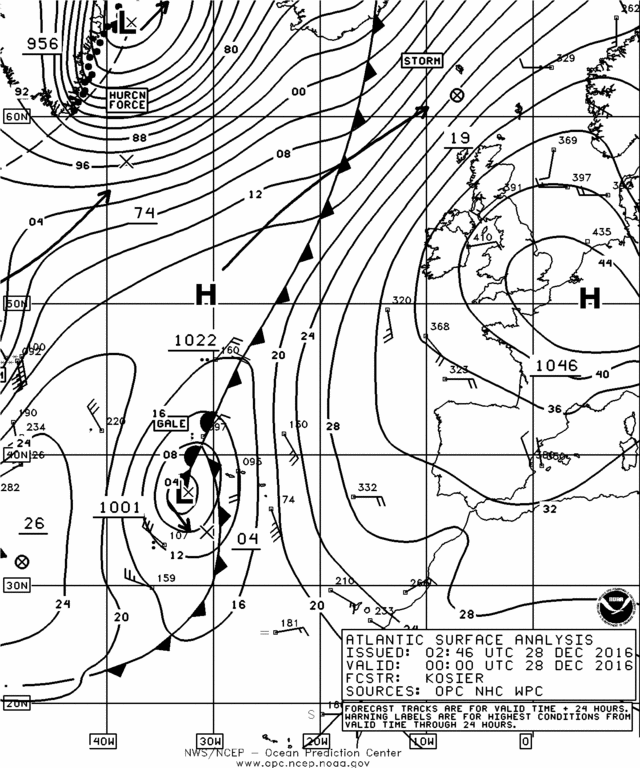
Synoptic chart 28 December 2016 showing high pressure area Yörn over southern England and near continent.

- Highest pressure: 20 January 2020 Luxembourg Findel Airport 1048.0 hPa.

Previously: 27–28 December 2016, MeteoLux recorded the highest atmospheric pressures observed at the Luxembourg Findel Airport weather station since measurement began in 1947, a value of 1047.2 hPa was recorded twice (under the high pressure Yörn). The previous record to this was from February 15–16, 1959 at 1046.6 hPa.

- Lowest pressure: February 1989 Luxembourg Findel Airport, 959.8.

Monthly maximum figures for atmospheric pressure Luxembourg (since 1947).
Month	Date	Location	Pressure (hPa)	ref	Notes
January	20 January 2020	Luxembourg Findel Airport	1048.0		Previously 1989 1045.5 hPa.
February	February 1959	Luxembourg Findel Airport	1046.6		
March	March 1990	Luxembourg Findel Airport	1045.8		
April	April 1947	Luxembourg Findel Airport	1039.9		
May	13 May 2019	Luxembourg Findel Airport	1037.5		
June	June 2005	Luxembourg Findel Airport	1036.3		
July	July 1969	Luxembourg Findel Airport	1031.2		
August	August 1949	Luxembourg Findel Airport	1033.5		
September	25 September 2018	Luxembourg Findel Airport	1039.3		
October	October 1983	Luxembourg Findel Airport	1040.0		
November	November 2001	Luxembourg Findel Airport	1042.1		
December	27–28 December 2016	Luxembourg Findel Airport	1047.2		Previously 1991 1044.0 hPa.

Monthly minimum figures for atmospheric pressure Luxembourg (since 1947).
Month	Date	Location	Pressure (hPa)	ref	Notes
January	January 2009	Luxembourg Findel Airport	967.6		
February	February 1989	Luxembourg Findel Airport	959.8		
March	March 1994	Luxembourg Findel Airport	968.6		
April	April 1962	Luxembourg Findel Airport	984.2		
May	May 2009	Luxembourg Findel Airport	983.2		
June	June 2009	Luxembourg Findel Airport	988.8		
July	July 1987	Luxembourg Findel Airport	993.7		
August	August 2008	Luxembourg Findel Airport	979.7		
September	September 1974	Luxembourg Findel Airport	988.5		
October	October 1990	Luxembourg Findel Airport	979.8		
November	November 1965	Luxembourg Findel Airport	974.6		
December	December 1976	Luxembourg Findel Airport	966.5		

=== Netherlands ===
The Dutch Royal Netherlands Meteorological Institute lists the following as national records:

- Highest air pressure: 26 January 1932, De Bilt, Utrecht 1050.4 hPa.

- weergegevens.nl give a value on 23 January 1907 at Eelde of 1053.0 hPa.

- Lowest air pressure: 27 November 1983, Eelde, Drenthe 954.2 hPa.

==== Netherlands monthly maximum figures for atmospheric pressure ====
Monthly maximum figures for atmospheric pressure Netherlands based on KNMI hourly observations.
Month	Date	Location	Pressure (hPa)	ref	Notes
January	23 January 1907	Eelde	1053.0		*Alt: 26 January 1932, De Bilt 1050.4 hPa.
February	16 February 2008	Eelde	1048.1		*Alt: 1046.7 hPa.
March	6 March 1852	Utrecht	1046.9		
April	10 April 1938	Vlissingen	1041.6		
May	13 May 2019	Vlieland	1041.9		*Previously 16 May 1943 Eelde, De Bilt and De Kooy 1040.2 hPa
June	6–7 June 1962	De Kooy	1038.3		Alt. 7 June 1962 unknown location 1036.9.
July	8 July 2013	Hoorn	1034.6		
July	10 July 1911	De Kooy	1034.6		
August	13 August 1949	Maastricht	1034.1		
September	25 September 2018	Maastricht	1040.2		Previously: 29 September 2015 Hoorn 1039.8 hPa.
October	22 October 1983	Rotterdam and Soesterberg	1041.7		
November	20 November 1915	Eelde	1044.7		
December	23 December 1962	Eelde	1050.2		

==== Netherlands monthly minimum figures for atmospheric pressure ====
Monthly minimum figures for atmospheric pressure Netherlands
Month	Date	Location	Pressure (hPa)	ref	Notes
January	23 January 2009	Hook of Holland	961.0		
February	25 February 1989	Vlissingen	954.4		
March	24 March 1986	Leeuwarden	963.5		
April	1 April 1994	De Kooy	972.6		
May	5 May 2000	De Bilt	983.5		*Alt: 5 May 2004, Vlieland 982.3 hPa.
June	27 June 1958	Vlissingen	988.0		
July	10 July 2000	De Bilt	987.5		*Alt: 10 July 2000, Hoorn (Terschelling) 984.0 hPa.
August	27 August 1912	De Bilt	973.0		
September	24 September 1927	De Kooy	974.8		
October	27 October 1959	De Kooy	968.8		
November	27 November 1983	Eelde, Drenthe	954.2		
December	10 December 1965	Leeuwarden	961.5		

=== Germany ===
The German weather service (DWD) give the

- Highest air pressure: 23 January 1907, Greifswald, Mecklenburg-Vorpommern 1060.8 hPa.
- Lowest air pressure: 27 November 1983 in Emden, Lower Saxony at 954.4 hPa.

Other record figures and locations are also presented:

- 23 January 1907 Dahlem (Berlin) 1057.8 hPa. It is claimed this is an incorrect correction to mslp and correct value is 1056.7 hPa. (neither figure is higher than the DWD value)

==== Germany monthly maximum figures for atmospheric pressure ====
Monthly maximum figures for atmospheric pressure Germany based on DWD CDC hourly station observations of air pressure at mean sea level, 1949–Present. (tentative)
Month	Date	Location	Pressure (hPa)	Altitude (m)	ref	Notes
January	23 January 1907	Greifswald, Mecklenburg-Vorpommern	1060.8			National record.
February	15 February 1959	Mühldorf, Bavaria	1050	405.6		
March	19 March 2022	Kiel lighthouse	1049.5			Previously 4 March 1990 Garmisch Partenkirchen, Bavaria 1048.5.
April	21 April 2002	Greifswalder Oie, Mecklenburg-Vorpommern	1039.3	12		Based on Berlin record, Berlin only value 1040.1 hPa 4 April 1909.
May	13 May 2019	Norderney, Lower Saxony	1041.1	11.47		Based on NL record.
June	7 June 1962	List on Sylt, Schleswig-Holstein	1037.8	24.7		Based on NL & DK.
July	16 July 2006	Waren (Müritz), Mecklenburg-Vorpommern	1034.3	72.6		Based on Berlin.
August	4 August 1981	Neustadt an der Weinstraße, Rhineland-Palatinate	1038.3	163		Based on Berlin
September	25 September 2018	Zwiesel, Bavaria	1042.8	614.7		Based on NL and Lux.
October	18 October 1993	Parow Airport, Mecklenburg-Vorpommern	1042.8	4		Based on Berlin.
November	18 November 1985	Arkona, Mecklenburg-Vorpommern	1046.5	42		Based on DK, offshore same value at Kiel Leuchtturm. CRU Emulate data 11 November 1859 in Jena have a value of 1046.01 hPa.
December	23 December 1963	Berlin Tempelhof Airport	1049.6	48		

== Central Europe ==
=== Austria ===
- A high pressure on 16 January 1882 Vienna 1050.5 hPa, the highest there since 1775.

The highest value is likely to have occurred during the 1907 high pressure event. Deutsche Seewarte gives an evening reading on 23 January 1907 in Vienna of 790.7 millimetres of mercury (1,054.2 hPa).

- A low pressure could possibly be 2 or 3 Dec 1976 (Based on HU and CZ records) <970 hPa.

=== Czech Republic ===
- Highest: 23 January 1907, Bystřice pod Hostýnem 1057.2 hPa.
- Lowest: 26 February 1989, Čáslav 967.2 hPa.

=== Hungary ===
The Hungarian Meteorological Service (OMSZ) gives the following values:

- Highest air pressure: 24 January 1907 Budapest 1055.9 hPa.

According to an expert article in the Hungarian journal Pótfüzetek a Természettudományi Közlönyhöz, the highest reading in Budapest on 24 January 1907 was 793.1 millimetres of mercury (1,057.4 hPa) at 8 hrs. A Hungarian meteorological journal Időjarás reports 793.0 millimetres of mercury (1,057.2 hPa) in Budapest on the same day.

- Lowest air pressure: 2 December 1976 Nagykanizsa 968.6 hPa.

=== Italy ===
- A high pressure: 16 January 1882, Turin 1049.3 hPa.

- A low pressure: 2 December 1976, Turin 971.7 hPa.

=== Liechtenstein ===
A private weather station in Balzers, southwest Liechtenstein reported on 28 December 2016 a value of 1046.4 hPa under the high named Yörn, described as a record by the Liechtensteiner Vaterland.

=== Poland ===
- The Polish Institute of Meteorology and Water Management list a record high pressure (post-war) on 16 December 1997 with 1054.4 hPa recorded in Suwalki.

It is likely 23 January 1907 saw a pressure of 1064.8 ± 0.5 mbar over Polish territory. Deutsche Seewarte gives morning readings on 23 January 1907 in Nowy Port (Neufahrwasser) of 798.2 millimetres of mercury (1,064.2 hPa), in Darłowo (Rügenwalde) and Warsaw (Warschau) of 796.5 millimetres of mercury (1,061.9 hPa), in Świnoujście (Swinemünde) of 795.0 millimetres of mercury (1,059.9 hPa) and in Kraków (Krakau) of 794.2 millimetres of mercury (1,058.8 hPa). According to an article in the German-Austrian expert journal Meteorologische Zeitschrift, on 23 January 1907 Suwalki reached 797.5 millimetres of mercury (1,063.2 hPa) and Warsaw (Warschau) 796.3 millimetres of mercury (1,061.6 hPa) at 7 hrs, while Nowy Port (Neufahrwasser) 797.9 millimetres of mercury (1,063.8 hPa) at 13 hrs. In another article in the same journal, Rudzki reports the highest value in Kraków of 794.4 millimetres of mercury (1,059.1 hPa) on 23 January 1907 at 10 a.m.

Other high pressures are reported as 1051.1 hPa January 22, 2006, 1050 hPa January 3, 1993 and 1048 hPa 10 December 1991.

- The lowest post WWII value of 965.2 hPa is reported from February 26, 1989 in Szczecin and Łódź.

Reanalysis data show a low record likely occurred on 17 January 1931 when a below 960 hPa low moved over the Baltic skirting the very north of today's Polish territory.

=== Slovakia ===
The Slovak Hydrometeorological Institute report:

- Highest air pressure: 23 January 1907 Oravský Podzámok 1062.3 hPa (possible error +0.1 hPa)

- Low air pressure (1961-2010): 3 December 1976 Boľkovce 970.2 hPa (the lowest published value; though is not thought to be a correct absolute minimum)

=== Slovenia ===
The Slovenian Environment Agency (ARSO) tweeted that pressure on 20 January 2020 reached 1048 hPa, slightly below the values seen on January 24, 1907 and 24 December 1963.

- A high pressure: attributed to ARSO 24 December 1963 in Murska Sobota 1052 hPa.

=== Switzerland ===
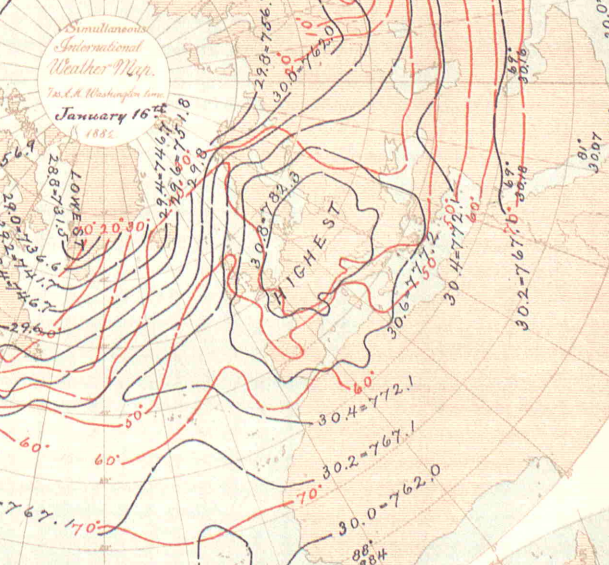
Pressure over Europe 16 January 1882 (782.3 mmHg ~1043 hPa)

- A high pressure from MeteoSwiss: 16 January 1882 at Zürichberg 1047 hPa.

27 December 2016 during the high pressure Yörn Bischofszell reported a QFF value of 1048.3 hPa. With the weather station at Zürichberg reporting its highest ever value since the station was established in 1949.

Other high pressures in Switzerland are given as 3–4 March 1990 at Zurich Airport of >1047 hPa and 29 January 1989 at Schaffhausen of 1047.2 hPa, which was the highest pressure in the country since the 1950s, when values on 15 February 1959 at Kloten reached 1047.1 hPa. A high value of 1050.2 hPa at Bern on 17 January 1882 is proposed as having occurred (on an internet forum). Though values in MeteoSwiss annals are unreduced to MSLP.

== Southeast Europe ==
=== Croatia ===
- Highest air pressure: January 1907 Grič, Zagreb 1049 hPa.

On 21 January 2020 the Croatian Meteorological and Hydrological Service (DHMZ) tweeted a high pressure value at Kutjevo in eastern Croatia at 1050 hPa.

=== Serbia ===
Deutsche Seewarte gives a morning reading on 24 January 1907 in Belgrade of 791.2 millimetres of mercury (1,054.8 hPa).

=== Romania ===
- A high air pressure on 24 January 1907 is reported at >1060 over Romania.

Articles in expert journals Időjarás and Pótfüzetek a Természettudományi Közlönyhöz report 797.0 millimetres of mercury (1,062.6 hPa) on 24 January 1907 in Sibiu (Nagyszeben). Deutsche Seewarte gives a morning Sibiu (Hermannstadt) reading on 24 January 1907 of 796.8 millimetres of mercury (1,062.3 hPa).

=== Greece ===
- A high pressure: 24 January 1907 Athens 8 am daily reading 787.7 millimetres of mercury (1,050.2 hPa).
- A low pressure: 21–22 January 2004 Icaria 972 hPa.

== Eastern Europe ==
=== Ukraine ===
A reading of 798 millimetres of mercury (1,064 hPa) in Ternopil (Ternopol) on 24 January 1907 is reported by an expert article in the Hungarian journal Pótfüzetek a Természettudományi Közlönyhöz. According to an article in the German-Austrian expert journal Meteorologische Zeitschrift, Lviv (Lemberg) reached 797.6 millimetres of mercury (1,063.4 hPa) on 23 January 1907 at 21 hrs. Deutsche Seewarte gives morning readings on 23 January 1907 in Lviv (Lemberg) of 796.3 millimetres of mercury (1,061.6 hPa).

=== Belarus ===
Deutsche Seewarte gives a morning reading on 24 January 1907 in Pinsk of 795.2 mmHg (1060.2 hPa).

== Iberia ==
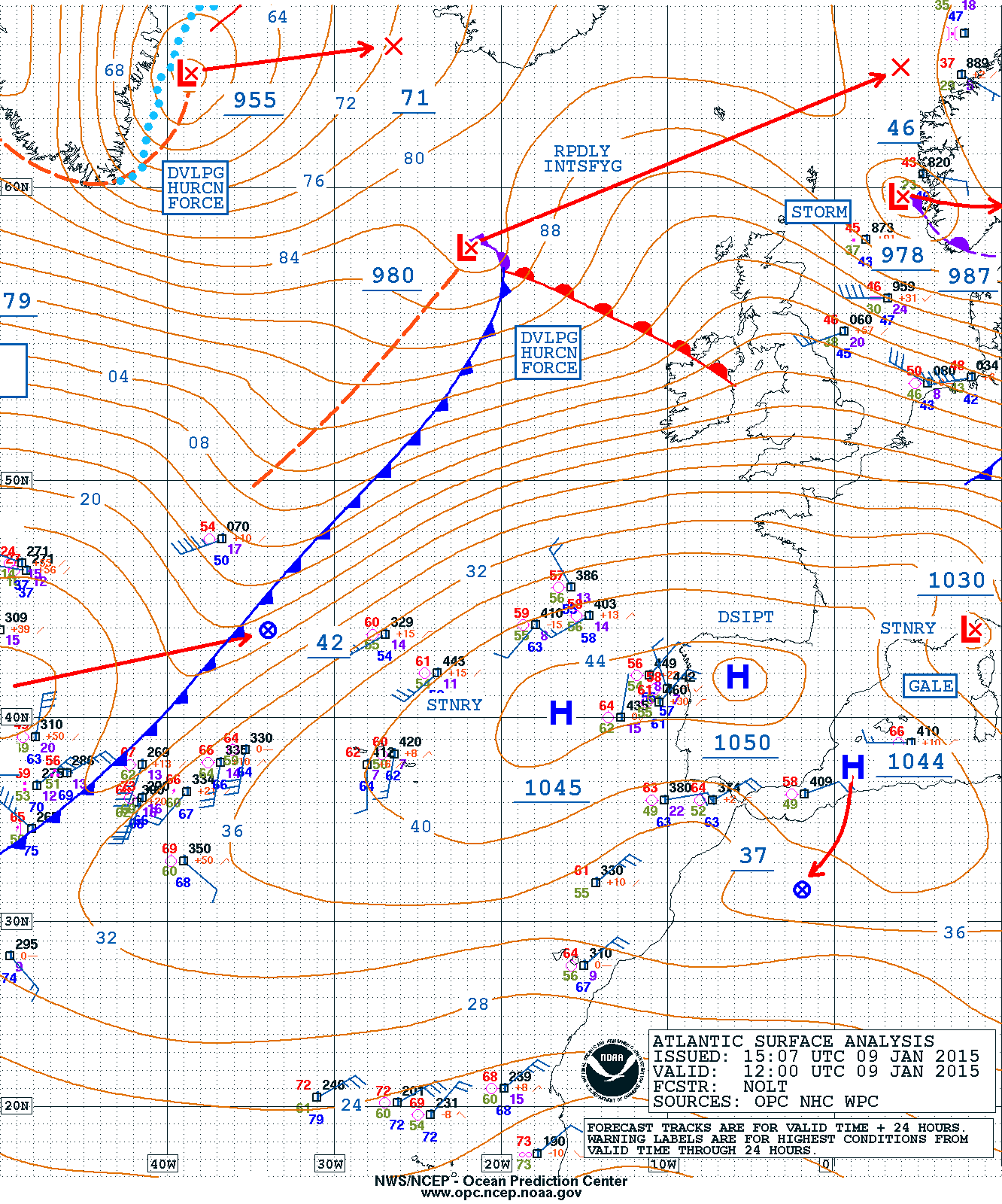
Synoptic chart of high pressure Iberia 2015

=== Spain ===
- A provisional highest atmospheric pressure: 9 January 2015 Castile and León ~1050 hPa. Benavente, Zamora reached 1050.6 hPa breaking the previous record from 10 December 1980 at L'Estartit north eastern Spain at 1045 hPa.

On 29 January 1905 Instituto Central Meteorológico report in Santander an evening reading of 788.5 millimetres of mercury (1,051.2 hPa).

- A low air pressure: February 1941, Santander 950 hPa.

=== Balearic islands ===
- Highest air pressure: 9 January 2015, Ibiza Airport 1041.1 hPa. The 9 January 2015 air pressure was 0.3 hPa more than the previous record from January 1983.

=== Portugal ===
- Highest air pressure: 9 January 2015 Chaves and Bragança, Portugal 1050.3 hPa. The first time values over 1050 hPa had been recorded in continental Portugal.
- A low air pressure: 15 February 1941 in Évora at 931 hPa is reported by one source, which also reports a minimum value of 937 hPa in Coimbra and 950 hPa in Lisbon during the passage of this low pressure. The Instituto Português do Mar e da Atmosfera give a value of 938.5 hPa at station level for Coimbra (not MSLP). Other sources only give minimum values of around 950 hPa in Lisbon as the minimum during the passage of this low. Garnier et al. (2018) state a pressure of 948.29 hPa recorded by the meteorological services on 15 February 1941, which is described as the lowest pressure recorded in the Algarve area since 1854.

== Notable non-tropical pressures over the North Atlantic ==
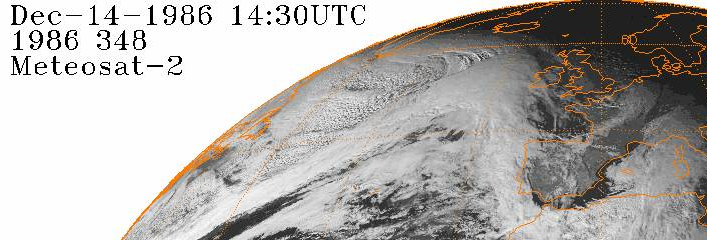
Deep low SW of Iceland 14 December 1986, which, according to the German Weather Service, possibly reached a nadir of 912–913 hPa over the North Atlantic

Notable atmospheric pressure reports from offshore and in the North Atlantic are:

- High pressure, 28 January 2003 saw high of 1057 centred at 51° N, 27° W (approx. 1000km north of Azores).

A lower value is reported from 27 to 28 February 1988 at 1053 hPa centred at approximately 53.5° N, 25.6° W.

- Low pressure, Two or three (possibly four) non-tropical areas of low pressure with central low pressure over the North Atlantic below 920 hPa have been reported, with a further unverified instance during the Night of the Big Wind (see above), these represent globally the lowest non-tropical large-scale synoptic values.

- 13 January 1993 Braer Storm dropped 78 hPa in 24 hours, to a central pressure out in the Atlantic at 62° N, 15° W of 914.0 hPa, and was likely the deepest cyclone on record for the North Atlantic, and very probably for any temperate latitude.

- 14–15 December 1986, The British Meteorological Office assessed the centre of a depression at about 916 hPa, the West German Meteorological Service enclosed the depression with a 915 hPa isobar, indicating a pressure possibly as low as 912–913 hPa.

For comparison, the lowest Atlantic basin tropical cyclone low pressure is Hurricane Wilma in 2005, which holds the record at 882 hPa. (see list of most intense tropical cyclones in the North Atlantic).

Similarly low extra-tropical values elsewhere have only been documented near Antarctica, with 919 hPa observed at Casey Station on the Windmill Islands (just outside the Antarctic Circle) on August 8–9, 1976 at Vincennes Bay (66°17’S 110°31’E). Though this value is considerably lower than any other on record and could conceivably be a fault with the recording instrument, though values are internally consistent with readings below 940 mb at this time. A study published in Geophysical Research Letters in July 2023 on an extratropical cyclone in the Southern Ocean in October 2022 estimated that the cyclone reached a pressure of 899.91 hPa (26.574 inHg) while also estimate four other cyclones in the same region with pressures below or equal to 914 hPa (27.0 inHg).

The two lowest extra-tropical pressures reported from the Pacific basin are the 8 November 2014 Bering Sea cyclone at 924 hPa (warnings for the low to reach 920 hPa were released by the Japan Meteorological Agency), and the 13 December 2015 North Pacific low at 924 hPa. 31 December 2020 NWS OPC analysis of a low 52N 173E down to 921 hPa.

=== North Atlantic low pressures below 940 hPa ===
During a typical winter, one or perhaps two low pressure areas in the North Atlantic will deepen below 950 hPa, with pressures only deepening below 940 hPa on average once or twice per decade. Before the satellite and weather model era, records (mostly from shipping) reported barometric pressures over the extratropical North Atlantic as going as low as 925 hPa, with values below 940 hPa being very rare occurrences. The frequency of very deep depressions (central pressure below about 940 hPa) in the North Atlantic is thought to have increased significantly since the winter of 1982/83 to 1993.

==== Table of North Atlantic low pressures below 940 hPa (incomplete) ====
Date	Location	Notes	Pressure (hPa)	Ref.
1822, 8 February	Reykjavik, Iceland	Onshore reading	926.5	
1824, 4 February	Reykjavik, Iceland	Onshore reading	924	
1838, 28 November	Limerick, Ireland	Onshore reading	931.2	
1839, 6 January	Northwest of Scotland	During the Night of the Big Wind low pressure may have reached a low of 914 hPa, though a value of 918 hPa is generally accepted. Though analysis of the land-based observed pressures indicate higher minima, around 931 hPa, and subsequently the depression's nadir at sea could be higher than proposed.	918	
1852, 21 January	Reykjavik		937.7	
1865, 31 December	Butt of Lewis Lighthouse, Scotland	A report of 27.63 inches of mercury (936 hPa) from Hoy, Orkney, which is not supported by observation from Cantick Head Lighthouse on South Walls.	937.7	
1870, 5 February	49° N, 26° W	The ship Neier (49° N, 26° W) reported and observation of 921.1 hPa, supported by an observation on HMS Tarifa (51° N, 26° W) of 925.5 hPa.	921.1	
1877, 11 November	Monach Lighthouse, Outer Hebrides	Onshore observation	939.7	
1884, 26 January	Ochtertyre, Perthshire	Lowest land based observation in the UK. 26 January record observed low pressure Ireland for that month at Markree Castle, Sligo 936.6 hPa. On 27 January 1884 Bergen in Norway reported an onshore observation of 939.7 hPa.	925.6	
1886, 8 December	Belfast	Land observation, the low probably reached values of around 924 hPa over Northern Ireland, lowest value reported on the island of Ireland.	927.2	
1888, 23 December	Reykjavik, Iceland		929	
1895, 6 December	Härnösand, Sweden	939.5 hPa was reported at Lungö Lighthouse (62° N, 18° E) on 6 December 1895.	938.4	
1907, 27 January	Bergen	Onshore observation	936	
1907, 20 February	East of the Shetland Islands	Low brought record observed low pressure to Denmark and Norway. (nadir ~934)	934	
1914, 27 December	Vestmannaeyjar, Iceland		929.0	
1924, 26 December	Grindavík, Reykjanes Iceland.		933.7	
1925, 7–8 February	Iceland	Halaveðrið	935	
1929, 2 December	Stórhöfði peninsula, Heimaey	Onshore observation (could be same system as 4 December 1929). The reading could have been as low as 919.7 hPa.	920	
1929, 4 December	Unknown	Reported by the ship SS Westpool in an unknown location in the North Atlantic (could be same system as 2 December 1929).	925.5	
1933, 3 January	Reykjavik, Iceland	Onshore reading of a low thought to be filling. 931.4 hPa recorded at Akureyri, the lowest pressure measured there.	927.2	
1945, 19 December	Between Iceland and Ireland	Lowest onshore measurement reported from Valentia, Ireland at 948.6 hPa, estimated central minimum of 927 hPa.	927	
1948, 2 February	SW of Iceland		933	
1949, 25 January	Dalatangi lighthouse, Mjóifjörður, east Iceland	Onshore report of 941 hPa with a central pressure offshore thought to be 940 hPa.	940	
1952, 27 October	53° N, 18.5° W	A vigorous development deepened around to a proposed low of 922 hPa, though the contemporary reports suggest 935–936 hPa as a more probable value.	935.5	
1962, 16 January	56° N, 19° W Ocean Weather ship 'Lima'		931.1	
1962, 13 February	Vidzeme Upland, Latvia		932.9	
1963, 19 October	Iceland	Onshore reading 938.4 hPa at Stórhöfði, Ex-Hurricane Flora.	935	
1972, 7 January	Near Ocean Weather ship Charlie		935	
1974, 10–11 January	56° N, 22.5° W	North west of Ireland, Met Éireann estimated the low deepened to a low of 936 hPa at 57° N, 21° W.	934	
1982, 8 February	SW Iceland	~932. 934 hPa in Daily Weather Report.	932	
1982, 16 December	Sundsvall	16 December an extreme low airpressure was identified in Sweden, centred on Sundsvall where recording instruments showed 939 hPa, nearly equalling the Swedish national record. 940.1 according to SMHI. Väike-Maarja, Estonia reported a station level value of 936.0 hPa.	939	
1982, 19–20 December	58.5° N, 15° W	The 20th Century low pressure record onshore in the UK occurred on 20 December 1982 at Sule Skerry dropping as low as 936 hPa. 937.6 hPa was recorded at Stornoway on 20 December 1982 as the lowest barometric pressure observed anywhere in the British Isles since 1886.	931	
1983, 5 January	South of Iceland,	929.9 hPa reported from Stórhöfði, Vestmannaeyjar. Could be the same low as mentioned in January 1983 by Brown (1995) at ~932 hPa.	930	
1983, 26 December	South east of Greenland		936	
1986, 14–15 December	61° N, 32° W	The ship Uyir measured a pressure of 920.2 hPa south east of Greenland on December 15, 1986. The Met Office estimated a central pressure of 916 hPa. The West German weather Service estimated the low could have reached as low as 912–913 hPa.	916	
1989, 4–5 January	Offshore Nova Scotia	"ERICA IOP4 storm" post-analysis suggested that the pressure fell to a possible low of to 928 hPa. This was the lowest pressure ever observed in an Atlantic extratropical cyclone south of 40 degrees latitude in the 20th century.	936	
1989, 15 February	Ocean weather station Mike, Norwegian sea 66° N, 2° E	Pressure likely to have dropped to 935.5 hPa, as the recorder was not able to print the lowest pressure.	937.1	
1989, 29 October		CFS reanalysis chart, 921 hPa.	926	
1989, 24 December	South west of Iceland	Estimated at a little below 920 hPa. 929.5 hPa reported from Stórhöfði, Vestmannaeyjar.	920	
1990, 1 March	Finland	This value is not reported by the Finnish Meteorological Institute.	939.7	
1992, 2 March	Offshore of Newfoundland		926	
1992, 23 November	Offshore SE Iceland		938	
1992, 29 November	East of Cape Farewell, Greenland lee low	931.5	936	
1993, 10 January	62° N, 15° W North Atlantic west of Faroe Islands	Braer storm was the deepest cyclone on record for the North Atlantic, and very probably for any temperate latitude 912–915 hPa. Low claimed to have reached a nadir of 913, with 916 confirmed. 914	914	
1999, 15–16 January	South of Iceland	Ship Dettifoss (P3BK4) reported 928 hPa. MeteoFrance publication 925 hPa.	926	
1999, 25 December	Between Scotland and Norway	A Central Forecasting Office, Bracknell analysis gave a lowest pressure of 938 hPa, based on reported pressures of 940 hPa over the North Sea. Buoy 63113 at 61°N 1.7°E reported a minimum pressure of 937.6 hpa at 1300 UTC 25 December.	938	
1999, 31 December	59° N, 35° W	Formation of two sub 940 lows in 1999 book-ended the destructive Cyclone Lothar and Martin in Europe.	929	
2003, 8 March	Central Atlantic	Named "Gordian" by the Free University of Berlin, analysed by them to have deepened below 940 hPa.	924	
2006, 10 December	62° N, 37° W	Named "Xynthia" by the Free University of Berlin, who estimated central pressure below 930 hPa.	928	
2007, 12 December			928	
2009, 23 January	Between Iceland and Scotland	Named "Hans" by the Free University of Berlin.	938	
2011, 10 February	56° N, 32° W	Named "Paolini" by the Free University of Berlin.	935	
2013, 26 January		Named "Jolle" by Free University of Berlin	932	
2013, 24 December		Cyclone Dirk, this was the lowest barometric pressure observed at any site in the British Isles, and the deepest depression to pass close to the British Isles, since 8 December 1886, 936.4 hPa at Stornoway was reported on minute observations at 12:29, with 936.8 hPa recorded at the 13:00 hourly observation. At the southernmost tip of the Faroe Islands a low air pressure of 932.2 hPa was recorded on Christmas Eve at Akraberg lighthouse.	927	
2014, 5 January	51° N, 36° W	Christina	934	
2015, 5 December	South of Iceland	Desmond	939	
2015, 29 December	South east of Iceland	Frank/Eckhardt.	928	
2016, 21 December	SW of Jan Mayen (70° N, 13° W)	Named Zarina by FUB. Low mimima likely over Arctic Ocean. ECMWF model estimated low down to 937 hPa.	940	
2017, 6 February	54° N, 30° W	Named Niklas by FUB, UKMO chart down to 929 hPa, NWSOPC 932 hPa, DMI 935 hPa.	932	
2017, 25 February	Between Greenland and Iceland	Named Udo by FUB, 938 hPa UKMO analysis chart 06 UTC 25 Feb 2017.	939	
2018, 14 January	Close to Jan Mayen	Named Evi by FUB, 935 hPa 1800 UTC 14 Jan 2018 UKMO Analysis chart,	935	
2018, 12 October	West of Ireland	Named Callum by UK and Irish Met Offices, Nevine by FUB, 938 hPa 0000 UTC 12 Oct 2018. Met Éireann forecasters commentary gave a value as low as 936 hPa. 937 hPa. Reported as the lowest early season pressure for an extratropical Atlantic storm since at least 1979 by Met Éireann.	938	
2019, 20 February	53° N, 33° W	Named Julia by the Instituto Português do Mar e da Atmosfera. NWS OPC analysis 934 hPa.. UKMO 936 hPa.	934	
2020, 8 February	63° N, 37° W	Named "Ruth" by the Free University of Berlin. NWS "Greenland Bomb".	930	
2020, 14 February	59° N, 24° W	Named "Uta" by the Free University of Berlin. 929 NWS NWS "Iceland Bomb".	933	
2020, 15 February	63° N, 20° W	Named "Dennis" by UKMO, "Victoria" by Free University of Berlin. Onshore 932.3 hPa reported from Surtsey, Iceland. UKMO 922 hPa. ECMWF 919 hPa.	920	
2020, 16 December	NE of Newfoundland	"Eva" FUB	938	
2022, 6 January	SE of Greenland	"Barbara" FUB, UKMO 931 hPa. NWS forecast 928 hPa.	931	
2022, 7 February	Between Iceland and Greenland	"Sarai" FUB, UKMO 930 hPa. NWS 928.	930	
2022, 14 March	South of Greenland	UKMO 929. 927. Onshore locations in Greenland reported lows of 935.7 (or as low as 934.1).	929	
2022, 24 September	Nova Scotia	Post-tropical Cyclone Fiona, thought to be the lowest pressure observed in Canada.	931	
2022, 4 November		Post tropical Cyclone Martin	934	
2024, 21 November		"Bert" FUB,	936	

== See also ==
- Climate of Europe
- Climate of the United Kingdom
- United Kingdom weather records
- List of weather records
