= List of shipwrecks in January 1839 =

The list of shipwrecks in January 1839 includes ships sunk, foundered, wrecked, grounded, or otherwise lost during January 1839.

== 1 January ==
List of shipwrecks: January 1839
Ship	State	Description
Diamond	United Kingdom	The ship was driven ashore near Fort Augustus, Inverness-shire.
Farmer	United Kingdom	The ship ran aground on the Black Rock. She was on a voyage from Belfast, County Antrim to Troon, Ayrshire.
Isabella	United Kingdom	The ship sprang a leak and was beached at Donaghadee, County Down. She was on a voyage from London to Runcorn, Cheshire.
John Wood	United Kingdom	The paddle steamer was damaged by fire at Havre de Grâce, Seine-Inférieure, France.
Marchioness of Huntley	United Kingdom	The ship was driven ashore and wrecked in the Copeland Islands, County Down. She was on a voyage from Dundalk, County Louth to Islay, Inner Hebrides.
Mary	United Kingdom	The ship was wrecked on Oronsay, Orkney Islands with the loss of a crew member. She was on a voyage from Hamburg to Saint John, New Brunswick, British North America.
Raisbeck	United Kingdom	The ship was driven ashore at Portsmouth, Hampshire. She was on a voyage from Sunderland, County Durham to Lancaster, Lancashire.
Roscoe	United Kingdom	The sloop was driven ashore and wrecked at Scrabster, Caithness.
Thomas and William	United Kingdom	The ship ran aground at King's Lynn, Norfolk. She was on a voyage from King's Lynn to London. She was later refloated, and resumed her voyage on 3 January.
Zakrevsky	(Russian Empire) Grand Duchy of Finland	The ship was driven ashore at Longhope, Orkney Islands. She was on a voyage from Oulu to Liverpool, Lancashire. Zakrevsky was refloated on 27 January and taken into Stromness, Orkney Islands for repair.

== 2 January ==
List of shipwrecks: 2 January 1839
Ship	State	Description
Edouard Presentief	(United Kingdom of Great Britain and Ireland) Guernsey	The ship foundered in the North Sea off Vlieland, Friesland, Netherlands with the loss of all hands. She was on a voyage from Copenhagen, Denmark to Guernsey.
Jannett	United Kingdom	The ship was wrecked on Skagen, Denmark with the loss of a crew member. She was on a voyage from Saint Petersburg, Russia to Leith, Lothian.
Jean	United Kingdom	The ship was driven ashore in West Loch Tarbert. She was on a voyage from Londonderry to Glasgow, Renfrewshire.
Pangus	France	The ship ran aground at Havre de Grâce, Seine-Inférieure. She was on a voyage from New Orleans, Louisiana, United States to Havre de Grâce. Pangus was later refloated and towed into Havre de Grâce by the steam tug Rolla (France).
Zoar	United Kingdom	The ship departed from South Shields, County Durham for Rotterdam, South Holland. She subsequently foundered, probably during the Night of the Big Wind. A piece of wreckage from her washed up on Ameland, Friesland.

== 3 January ==
List of shipwrecks: 3 January 1839
Ship	State	Description
Adele	France	The ship was driven ashore at Tarifa, Spain. She was on a voyage from Marseille, Bouches-du-Rhône to Guadeloupe. Adele was refloated on 10 January and taken into Gibraltar.
Albion	United Kingdom	The ship ran aground and capsized in the River Witham. She was on a voyage from Sunderland, County Durham to Boston, Lincolnshire.
Allen	United Kingdom	The ship departed from Maldon, Essex for Goole, East Riding of Yorkshire. No further trace, presumed foundered with the loss of all hands.
Catherine	United Kingdom	The ship ran aground at Wexford. She was on a voyage from Quebec City, Lower Canada, British North America to Wexford. Catherine was later refloated.
Catherine	Bremen	The ship was abandoned in the North Sea off Heligoland. She was on a voyage from Odesa to Bremen.
Navarin	United Kingdom	The ship sprang a leak and foundered in the North Sea off Flamborough Head, Yorkshire. Her crew were rescued. She was on a voyage from South Shields, County Durham to King's Lynn, Norfolk.
Pallion	United Kingdom	The ship foundered off Hartlepool, County Durham. Her crew were rescued. She was on a voyage from Newcastle upon Tyne, Northumberland to Scarborough, Yorkshire.
Royal William	United Kingdom	The ship departed from London for Newcastle upon Tyne. No further trace, presumed foundered in the North Sea with the loss of all hands.
Success	United Kingdom	The brig was discovered to be on fire in the River Thames at Deptford, Kent. She was towed to Wapping, Middlesex where the fire was extinguished. Success was severely damaged.
Swift	United Kingdom	The ship struck rocks and sank at Newton-by-the-Sea, Northumberland. Her crew survived.
Viewforth	United Kingdom	The ship ran aground on the Cross Sand, in the North Sea off the coast of Norfolk. She was on a voyage from North Shields, County Durham to Calcutta, India.

== 4 January ==
List of shipwrecks: January 1839
Ship	State	Description
Allen	United Kingdom	The ship departed from Maldon, Essex for Leeds, Yorkshire. No further trace, presumed foundered with the loss of all hands.
Anna Dorothea	Norway	The ship was driven ashore at Christiansand. She was on a voyage from St. Ubes, Portugal to Trondheim.
Atalante	France	The ship ran aground. She subsequently put into Egersund, Norway.
Confidence	United Kingdom	The ship departed from Bristol, Gloucestershire for Liverpool, Lancashire. She subsequently foundered in the Irish Sea. One of her boats washed up in St. Brides Bay on 14 January.
Earl of Durham	United Kingdom	The ship was wrecked on the Haisborough Sands, in the North Sea off the coast of Norfolk. Her crew were rescued by Stadt Leer (Kingdom of Hanover). Earl of Durham was on a voyage from London to Newcastle upon Tyne, Northumberland.
James	United Kingdom	The ship was driven ashore and sank in Lunan Bay. Her crew were rescued by Coast Guard.

== 5 January ==
List of shipwrecks: 5 January 1839
Ship	State	Description
Acorn	United Kingdom	The ship was wrecked at Bergen, Norway with the loss of a pilot. She was on a voyage from Aberdeen to Lerwick, Shetland Islands.
Albion	United Kingdom	The ship was driven ashore on Kerrary Island, 4 nautical miles (7.4 km) from Oban, Argyllshire. She was on a voyage from Montrose, Forfarshire to Londonderry.
Catherina	Bremen	The ship foundered in the North Sea 10 nautical miles (19 km) south west of Heligoland. She was on a voyage from Odesa to Bremen.
Clifton	United Kingdom	The ship ran aground at Newport, Monmouthshire. She was on a voyage from Quebec City, Lower Canada, British North America to Newport. Clifton was later refloated.
Isabel	United Kingdom	The ship departed from Wisbech, Cambridgeshire for Leith, Lothian. No further trace, presumed foundered with the loss of all hands.
Josephine	United Kingdom	The ship was damaged by fire at New York, United States.
Linnet	United Kingdom	The ship departed from Wivenhoe, Essex for Goole, Yorkshire. No further trace, presumed foundered in the North Sea with the loss of all hands.
Thomas and Mary	United Kingdom	The ship departed from Maldon, Essex for Leeds or Wakefield, Yorkshire. No further trace, presumed foundered with the loss of all hands.
Three Sisters	United Kingdom	The ship sank at the mouth of the River Avon. She had been refloated by 8 January.
Venus	United Kingdom	The ship was driven ashore and capsized in Lough Swilly. Her crew were rescued.

== 6 January ==
List of shipwrecks: 6 January 1839
Ship	State	Description
Andrew Nugent	United Kingdom	The ship was driven ashore and wrecked at Arranmore, County Donegal with the loss of all hands. She was on a voyage from Sligo to London.
Bethel	United Kingdom	The ship was driven ashore at Bideford, Devon. She was on a voyage from Prince Edward Island, British North America to Bideford. Bethel was refloated on 13 January and taken into Bideford.
Cybole	United Kingdom	The ship was driven ashore at Criccieth Castle, Caernarfonshire with the loss of a crew member. She was on a voyage from Saint John, New Brunswick, British North America to Belfast, County Antrim.
Endeavour	United Kingdom	The ship sank in the River Mersey. She was on a voyage from Liverpool, Lancashire to Drogheda, County Louth.
Gazelle	United Kingdom	The ship was driven ashore at Plymouth, Devon. She was on a voyage from Dundee, Forfarshire to Saint Domingo.
George and Henry, and Windham	United Kingdom	George and Henry was run down and sunk in the North Sea off the coast of Suffolk by Windham. Their crews took to the boats and were rescued by Vistula (United Kingdom). Windham came ashore at Corton, Suffolk, where she was wrecked.
John Airey	United Kingdom	The ship was driven ashore and wrecked at Whitehaven, Cumberland with the loss of all but her captain, or the captain, his wife and two sailors.
Joseph and John	United Kingdom	The ship departed from Great Yarmouth, Norfolk for Leeds, Yorkshire. No further trace, presumed foundered with the loss of all hands.
Leonidas	United Kingdom	The ship was driven ashore at Ostend, West Flanders, Belgium. Her crew were rescued. She was on a voyage from Sunderland, County Durham to Southampton, Hampshire.
Loch Ryan	United Kingdom	The steamship was driven ashore at Stranraer, Wigtownshire.
Margaret	United Kingdom	The ship departed from Arbroath, Forfarshire for Glasgow, Renfrewshire. No further trace, presumed foundered with the loss of all hands.
Mary Anne	United Kingdom	The ship foundered off Rothesay, Bute with the loss of all hands. She was on a voyage from Sligo to Rothesay.
Marys	United Kingdom	The ship sank at Stranraer with the loss of two of her crew.
Nautilus	United Kingdom	The ship departed from Wisbech, Cambridgeshire for Stockton-on-Tees, County Durham. No further trace, presumed foundered with the loss of all hands.
Richard Hill	United Kingdom	The ship was driven ashore in Blacksod Bay. She was on a voyage from Plymouth, Devon to Limerick.
Richmond	United Kingdom	The ship ran aground on the Inner Sand, in the North Sea off the coast of Suffolk. She was later refloated.
Spencer	United Kingdom	The ship departed from King's Lynn, Norfolk for Newcastle upon Tyne, Northumberland. No further trace, presumed foundered with the loss of all hands.
Superb	United Kingdom	The ship was driven against the quayside and severely damaged at Westport, County Mayo.
Swift	United Kingdom	The ship departed from Liverpool for Gibraltar. She subsequently foundered.
Undine	United Kingdom	The schooner was driven ashore and severely damaged at Scattery Island, County Clare with the loss of five of her crew. She was on a voyage from Limerick to London.
Union Jack	United Kingdom	The schooner was driven ashore on Governors Island, Boston, Massachusetts, United States.
Young Susannah	United Kingdom	The sloop was driven ashore and wrecked at Easton Bavents, Suffolk. Her crew were rescued. She was on a voyage from Gunness-on-Trent, Lincolnshire to London.

== 7 January ==
List of shipwrecks: 7 January 1839
Ship	State	Description
Aaron	United Kingdom	The sloop was driven ashore and damaged at Blackpool, Lancashire. She was on a voyage from Bangor to Shoreham-by-Sea, Sussex. She had been refloated by 1 February.
Adelphi	United Kingdom	The ship was driven ashore in the River Dee. Her crew were rescued.
Adelphi	United Kingdom	The ship was driven ashore at Donaghadee, County Down.
Adeona	United Kingdom	The ship was driven ashore or damaged at Troon, Ayrshire.
Admiral	United Kingdom	The steam ferry sank at Liverpool, Lancashire with the loss of two of her crew.
Agnes	United Kingdom	The ship was driven ashore at Blackpool. She had been refloated by 1 February and anchored off Lytham St. Annes.
Ailsa	United Kingdom	The ship was driven ashore in Bootle Bay.
Alert	United Kingdom	The ship was driven ashore at Heysham, Lancashire. She was on a voyage from Liverpool to Sligo.
Alexander	United Kingdom	The ship was driven ashore at Sligo. She had been refloated by 18 January.
Alexandra or Alexander	United Kingdom	The ship was driven ashore in Bootle Bay. She was on a voyage from Dublin to Liverpool.
Alpha	United Kingdom	The ship was driven ashore at Portaferry, County Down.
Amity	United Kingdom	The ship was driven ashore at Westport, County Mayo.
Amity	United Kingdom	The ship was severely damaged at Limerick.
Amy	United Kingdom	The two-masted schooner was driven ashore at Holyhead, Anglesey. She was on a voyage from Ipswich, Suffolk to Liverpool. Amy was refloated on 14 January and taken into Holyhead.
Anaxibia	United Kingdom	The ship was driven ashore at Kilrush. Her crew were rescued. She was refloated on 14 January and taken into Kilrush.
Ann	United Kingdom	The ship was severely damaged at Maryport, Cumberland.
Ann	United Kingdom	The Dundee-registered ship was driven ashore or damaged at Troon.
Ann	United Kingdom	The Limerick-registered ship was driven ashore or damaged at Troon.
Ann	United Kingdom	The ship was driven ashore and wrecked south of Portpatrick, Wigtownshire with the loss of all hands.
Ann	United Kingdom	The ship was driven ashore in the Belfast Lough. She was on a voyage from Lima, Peru to the Clyde.
Ann	United Kingdom	The ship was driven ashore in Loch Indaal. She was on a voyage from Liverpool to Donegal. Ann was refloated on 25 January and repaired.
Anna Agatha	Netherlands	The ship was driven ashore in the River Mersey. She was on a voyage from Rotterdam, South Holland to Liverpool. Anna Agatha was later refloated.
Anna Johanna	Hamburg	The ship was wrecked near Mandal, Norway. Her crew were rescued. She was on a voyage from New Orleans, Louisiana to Hamburg.
Anne	United Kingdom	The ship was severely damaged at Limerick.
Anne Catherine	Norway	The ship sank at Laurvig.
Annes	United Kingdom	The ship was damaged at Limerick.
Ann Paley	United Kingdom	The barque was driven ashore near the mouth of the River Ribble with the loss of three of her crew. She was on a voyage from Liverpool to Lisbon, Portugal. Ann Paley was refloated on 20 April and taken into Fleetwood, Lancashire.
Antigua	United Kingdom	The ship was driven ashore at Westport. She was on a voyage from Marseille, Bouches-du-Rhône, France to Westport.
Aquila	United Kingdom	The ship was damaged at Donaghadee.
Arbutus	United Kingdom	The ship was driven ashore at Limerick.
Arcturus	United Kingdom	The ship was driven ashore at Tarbert. She was refloated on 17 January.
Ariel	United Kingdom	The ship was driven ashore at Troon. She had been refloated by 23 January.
HMS Asp	Royal Navy	The paddle steamer was damaged at Donaghadee.
Bangor Castle	United Kingdom	The ship was driven ashore at Ballymacarrett, County Antrim and was abandoned by her crew. She was on a voyage from Bangor, County Down to Belfast, County Antrim.
Barbara	United Kingdom	The ship was driven ashore at Blackpool. She had been refloated by 1 February.
Barbara	United Kingdom	The schooner was driven ashore at Campbeltown, Argyllshire. She was on a voyage from Dundee to Liverpool.
Barmouth	United Kingdom	The ship was driven ashore at Mostyn, Flintshire. Her crew were rescued. She was on a voyage from Barmouth, Merionethshire to Mostyn, Flintshire.
Barossa	United Kingdom	The ship was driven ashore or damaged at Troon.
Beatrice	United Kingdom	The ship was driven ashore and wrecked at Prestatyn, Flintshire with the loss of all hands.
Bell	United Kingdom	The ship was driven ashore at St. Margaret's Hope, Orkney Islands.
Bell Ann	United Kingdom	The ship sank at Donaghadee, County Down. Her crew were rescued. She was refloated on 9 March but found to be a complete wreck.
Belleck Castle	United Kingdom	The ship was driven ashore or damaged at Troon.
Belvoir Castle	United Kingdom	The ship was severely damaged at Maryport.
Betsey Packet	United Kingdom	The ship was driven ashore at Troon. She had been refloated by 23 January.
Blenkinsop	United Kingdom	The ship was driven ashore at Portaferry. She was later refloated.
Bonnie Lassie	United Kingdom	The ship sank at Ardglass, County Down.
Boreus	United Kingdom	The ship was driven ashore at Limerick. She was later refloated.
Bradil	United Kingdom	The ship was severely damaged at Maryport.
Brighton	India	The ship was wrecked on the West Hoyle Bank, in Liverpool Bay with the loss of fourteen of the 22 people on board. The survivors were rescued by lifeboat. Brighton was on a voyage from Bombay to Liverpool. Part of the wreck was subsequently driven ashore at Hoylake.
Brilliant	United Kingdom	The ship foundered off Lamlash, Isle of Arran. Her crew were rescued. She was on a voyage from Glasgow to Bristol.
Bristol	United Kingdom	The ship was driven ashore and damaged at Caernarfon. She was refloated on 19 January.
Britannia	United Kingdom	The ship was driven ashore at Sligo. She was on a voyage from Sligo to Liverpool. She had been refloated by 18 January.
Brothers	United Kingdom	The ship was driven ashore in the River Dee. Her crew were rescued.
Buoyant	United Kingdom	The schooner was driven ashore at Harrington, Cumberland. Her crew were rescued.
Cambridge	United Kingdom	The ship was driven ashore at Liverpool. She was on a voyage from Liverpool to New York, United States.
Caroline	United Kingdom	The ship was driven ashore on Inishcoo, County Donegal.
Carty	United Kingdom	The schooner was driven ashore at Blackpool. She had been refloated by 1 February.
Catherine	United Kingdom	The ship sank at Donaghadee. Her crew were rescued.
Catherine Fell	United Kingdom	The ship capsized and sank off the coast of Lancashire.
Charlotte	United Kingdom	The smack sank at Liverpool with the loss of two of her three crew.
Cherub	United Kingdom	The ship was driven ashore at Workington, Cumberland.
Cheshire Witch	United Kingdom	The ship was driven ashore near Bolan's Rock, Ayrshire.
Christian	Sweden	The ship was driven ashore at Laurvig. She was on a voyage from Gothenburg to London, United Kingdom. Christian was later refloated.
Clitus	United Kingdom	The ship was driven ashore or damaged at Troon.
Clyde	United Kingdom	The ship was driven ashore and severely damaged at Limerick.
Commerce	United Kingdom	The ship was driven ashore or damaged at Troon.
Commerce	United Kingdom	The ship capsized in the North Sea. She was righted but had sprung a leak. Her crew were rescued on 10 January by the brig Hero (United Kingdom). Commerce was on a voyage from Great Yarmouth, Norfolk to Newcastle upon Tyne.
Commodore	United Kingdom	The ship was driven ashore or damaged at Troon.
Confidence	United Kingdom	The ship was driven ashore at Sligo. She was on a voyage from Sligo to London. She had been refloated by 18 January.
Conservative	United Kingdom	The ship was driven ashore in the River Dee. Her crew were rescued.
Content	United Kingdom	The ship was driven ashore at Blackpool. She had been refloated by 1 February.
Cottager	United Kingdom	The ship was severely damaged at Maryport.
Courier	France	The ship caught fire and was beached at Kessingland, Suffolk. She was on a voyage from Gravelines, Nord, France to Hull, Yorkshire, United Kingdom. Courier was later refloated and taken into Great Yarmouth, Norfolk.
Courier	United Kingdom	The ship was driven ashore at Ballinlogan, County Sligo.
Courier	United Kingdom	The sloop was driven ashore at Boddam, Aberdeenshire. Her crew were rescued. She was on a voyage from Port Dundas Renfrewshire to Aberdeen.
Crusader	United Kingdom	The ship was driven ashore and wrecked at Blackpool. Her crew were rescued. She was on a voyage from Bombay to Liverpool. She broke up on 10 February.
Cumberland	United Kingdom	The ship was lost near Blackpool with the loss of all hands. She was on a voyage from Amlwch, Anglesey to Troon.
Damsel	United Kingdom	The ship was driven ashore at "Welram", Netherlands.
Dart	United Kingdom	The ship was driven ashore at Sligo. She was on a voyage from Sligo to London. Dart had been refloated by 18 January.
Dart	United Kingdom	The ship was driven ashore at Kilrush, County Clare. She had been refloated by 17 January.
Davies	United Kingdom	The ship was wrecked at Blackpool. Her crew were rescued. She was on a voyage from Liverpool to Wexford. She had been refloated by 1 February.
Dee	United Kingdom	The ship sank at Mostyn, Flintshire with the loss of all but her captain.
Dennis	United Kingdom	The ship was driven ashore at Blackpool. She was on a voyage from Liverpool to Wexford. She had been refloated by 1 February.
Despatch	United Kingdom	The ship was driven ashore and severely damaged at Portaferry.
Dianah	United Kingdom	The ship was driven ashore at Beaumaris, Anglesey. She was on a voyage from Caernarfon to Liverpool.
HMRC Diligence	Board of Customs	The cutter foundered of Tory Island, County Donegal with the loss of all 41 crew, plus her five passengers.
Dinas	United Kingdom	The ship was driven ashore at Beaumaris. She was on a voyage from Caernarfon to Liverpool. Dinas was refloated on 15 January.
Dorah	United Kingdom	The ship was driven ashore at Pwllheli, Caernarfonshire. She was on a voyage from Barmouth, Merionethshire to Caernarfon.
Dorothy	United Kingdom	The ship was driven ashore on the south east coast of Anglesey. She was on a voyage from Caernarfon to Ayr.
Duchess of Bridgwater	United Kingdom	The steamship sank in the River Mersey.
Duke of Bridgwater	United Kingdom	The steamship sank in the Brunswick Dock, Liverpool.
Dundonald	United Kingdom	The ship was driven ashore at Troon. She was refloated on 2 February.
Dykes	United Kingdom	The ship was driven ashore at Troon and severely damaged. She was refloated on 31 March and taken into Troon.
Eagle	United Kingdom	The ship was driven ashore at Sligo. She was on a voyage from Sligo to London. She was refloated on 21 January.
Earl of Caithness	United Kingdom	The ship capsized off Killala, County Mayo. Her crew were rescued.
Earl of Errol	p	The ship was driven ashore in Loch Indaal. She was on a voyage from Glasgow to Limerick. Earl of Errol was refloated on 2 February.
Echo	United Kingdom	The pilot cutter capsized off Ilfracombe, Devon.
Eclipse	United Kingdom	The paddle steamer was driven ashore and severely damaged at Caernarfon with the loss of a crew member. She was refloated on 28 January, and taken into Caernarfon for repairs. Eclipse was relaunched on 30 May.
Eclipse	United Kingdom	The ship was driven ashore or damaged at Troon.
Edwards	United Kingdom	The ship was wrecked on the Hoyle Bank. Her crew were rescued. She was on a voyage from Dundee, Forfarshire to Liverpool.
Elisha	France	The ship was driven ashore in Bootle Bay.
Eliza	United Kingdom	The brig was driven ashore at Limerick. She was later refloated but had to be beached.
Eliza	United Kingdom	The schooner was driven ashore at Cork.
Eliza	United Kingdom	The ship sank at Donaghadee.
Eliza and Catherine	(United Kingdom of Great Britain and Ireland) Isle of Man	The ship was driven ashore at Annan, Dumfriesshire.
Elizabeth	United Kingdom	The ship was driven ashore and damaged at Westport.
Elizabeth	United Kingdom	The ship was driven ashore at Troon. She had been refloated by 23 January.
Elizabeth	United Kingdom	The ship was driven ashore at Tarbert.
Elizabeth and Johanna	United Kingdom	The ship sank in Prince's Dock, Liverpool.
Eliza Jane	United Kingdom	The ship sank at Donaghadee. Her crew were rescued.
Ellen	United Kingdom	The ship sank at Portaferry.
Ellen	United Kingdom	The ship was driven ashore near Bolan's Rock, Ayrshire. She was refloated on 12 January.
Endeavour	United Kingdom	The ship was driven ashore at Troon. She had been refloated by 23 January.
Enterprise	United Kingdom	The ship was driven ashore or damaged at Troon.
Experiment	United Kingdom	The ship was driven ashore and wrecked near Ardwell, Wigtownshire with the loss of a crew member. She was on a voyage from Peterhead, Aberdeenshire to Glasgow, Renfrewshire.
Experiment	United Kingdom	The ship was abandoned in the Dogger Bank. Her crew were rescued.
Export	United Kingdom	The ship was driven ashore and damaged at Sligo. She was later refloated.
Fame	United Kingdom	The ship was driven ashore at Dundee, Forfarshire. She was later refloated.
Fanny	United Kingdom	The ship was driven ashore at Wrango, Sweden. She was on a voyage from Riga to Hull. Fanny was later refloated and towed into Gothenburg, Sweden.
Farmer	United Kingdom	The ship was driven ashore on Islay, Inner Hebrides.
Favourite	United Kingdom	The ship foundered in the Irish Sea off Blackpool with the loss of all hands. She was on a voyage from Liverpool to Genoa, Kingdom of Sardinia.
Favourite	United Kingdom	The ship was driven ashore at Beaumaris. She was on a voyage from Bangor, Caernarfonshire to Glasgow, Renfrewshire. Favourite was refloated on 15 January.
Favourite	United Kingdom	The ship sank in Prince's Dock, Liverpool.
Favourite	United Kingdom	The ship was driven ashore at Hull. She was on a voyage from King's Lynn to Leeds, Yorkshire. Favourite was refloated on 17 January and taken into Hull.
Fletcher	United Kingdom	The ship was driven ashore at Rhuddlan. Her crew were rescued.
Flora	United Kingdom	The ship was driven ashore at Hull. She was on a voyage from Maldon, Essex to Goole, Yorkshire. Flora had been refloated by 17 January and proceeded on her voyage.
Flora	United Kingdom	The ship was abandoned in the North Sea. Her crew were rescued by Ranger (United Kingdom).
Forster	United Kingdom	The ship capsized in the North Sea off Flamborough Head, but was subsequently righted. She was abandoned on 10 January 100 nautical miles (190 km) off Flamborough Head. Her crew were rescued. She was on a voyage from London to Hartlepool. Forster was driven ashore on Föhr, Duchy of Schleswig on 25 January.
Fortune	United Kingdom	The brig was driven ashore in Bootle Bay.
Fox	United Kingdom	The steamship was driven into other vessels and sank at Newcastle upon Tyne, Northumberland.
Foxdale	(United Kingdom of Great Britain and Ireland) Isle of Man	The schooner sank in the Victoria dock, Liverpool. Her crew were rescued. She was on a voyage from Douglas to Flint.
Garryowen	United Kingdom	The steamship was driven ashore at Kilrush, County Clare.
George	United Kingdom	The ship was driven ashore or damaged at Troon.
George	United Kingdom	The ship was driven ashore at Kilrush. She had been refloated by 17 January.
George	United Kingdom	The ship was severely damaged at Liverpool.
George	United Kingdom	The ship was driven ashore and wrecked at Fair Head, County Antrim. Her crew were rescued. She was on a voyage from Ballina, County Mayo to Belfast.
George Lawrence	United Kingdom	The ship was driven ashore or damaged at Troon.
Gift	United Kingdom	The sloop sank in the Humber at Hedon, Yorkshire with the loss of two of her crew. She was later refloated.
Glasgow	United Kingdom	The ship was driven ashore at Holyhead, Anglesey. She was on a voyage from Quebec City, Lower Canada, British North America to Belfast.
Gleaner	United Kingdom	The ship was driven ashore at Foynes, County Limerick.
Gleaner	United Kingdom	The ship was driven ashore at Tarbert.
Glendale	United Kingdom	The ship was driven ashore and sank at Pakefield, Suffolk with the loss of her captain.
Glenora	United Kingdom	The ship was driven ashore in Lough Athalia, County Galway.
Gloucester	United Kingdom	The ship was driven ashore at Swansea, Glamorgan. She was on a voyage from Bordeaux, Gironde, France to Neath, Glamorgan.
Goodintent	United Kingdom	The ship was driven ashore or damaged at Troon. She was on a voyage from Glasgow to Islay.
Grace	United Kingdom	The ship was driven ashore near Blackpool. She had been refloated by 1 February.
Grecian	United Kingdom	The ship capsized at Kilrush.
Griffiths	United Kingdom	The ship was driven ashore in the River Dee. Her crew were rescued.
Green	United Kingdom	The ship was driven ashore at Blackpool. She had been refloated by 1 February.
Haabet	Sweden	The ship was driven ashore at Laurvig. She was on a voyage from Gothenburg to London. Haabet was later refloated.
HMRC Hamilton	Board of Customs	The cutter was driven ashore at Cappa, County Clare.
Hansworth	United Kingdom	The ship sank in the Humber at Marfleet, East Riding of Yorkshire with the loss of all but one of her crew. She was on a voyage from Hedon to Goole.
Harlequin	United Kingdom	The ship was driven ashore in Bootle Bay. She was refloated on 16 January.
Harmony	United Kingdom	The ship was driven ashore at Troon. She had been refloated by 23 January.
Harmony	United Kingdom	The ship was severely damaged at Limerick.
Harmony	United Kingdom	The ship was driven ashore on Islay.
Harriet	United Kingdom	The schooner was driven ashore and severely damaged at the mouth of the River Ribble.
Harriet	United Kingdom	The schooner was driven ashore at Liverpool.
Harvest Home	United Kingdom	The ship was wrecked off Southport with the loss of all but two of her crew. She was on a voyage from Liverpool to Saint Thomas, Virgin Islands.
Helen	United Kingdom	The ship was driven ashore at Portaferry.
Helen	United Kingdom	The ship was driven ashore at Sligo. She was on a voyage from Liverpool to Ballina, County Mayo.
Helen	United Kingdom	The ship was driven ashore or damaged at Troon.
Henry	United Kingdom	The ship was driven ashore at Milford Haven, Pembrokeshire.
Henry	United Kingdom	The ship was driven into the quayside and damaged at Bangor, Caernarfonshire.
Henry	United Kingdom	The brig was driven ashore at Cork.
Henry Hastings	United Kingdom	The brig was driven ashore and severely damaged at Kircubbin, County Down.
Hercules	United Kingdom	The ship was driven ashore near Ulverston, Lancashire. She was refloated on 18 January.
Hetty Clifton	United Kingdom	The ship was driven ashore near Blackpool. She had been refloated by 1 February.
Hibernia	United Kingdom	The ship was driven ashore at Blackpool. She had been refloated by 1 February.
Hillsborough	United Kingdom	The ship was driven ashore at Donaghadee.
Hindoo	United Kingdom	The ship was wrecked in Carnarvon Bay near Holyhead. Her crew were rescued. She was on a voyage from Pictou, Nova Scotia, British North America to the Clyde. Hindoo was later refloated and taken into Caernarfon, where she was repaired. She was relaunched on 28 May.
Hope	United Kingdom	The ship was driven ashore at Tarbert.
Hotspur	United Kingdom	The ship was severely damaged at Limerick.
Industrious Helen	United Kingdom	The sloop was driven ashore at Largs, Ayrshire. Her four crew were rescued. She was later refloated and taken into Largs.
Industry	United Kingdom	The brig was driven ashore at Ayr. Her crew survived. She was on a voyage from Belfast to Troon.
Investus	p	The ship was driven ashore on Inishcoo. She capsized and sank.
Iris	Norway	The ship was driven ashore at "Bekkington". She was on a voyage from Bergen to Stockholm. She was later refloated and put back to Bergen.
Iris	United Kingdom	The ship was damaged at Donaghadee.
Irvine	United Kingdom	The steamship was driven ashore and wrecked at Troon.
James	United Kingdom	The ship was severely damaged at Maryport.
James	United Kingdom	The ship was severely damaged at Limerick.
Jane	United Kingdom	The ship was driven ashore at South Shields, County Durham.
Jane	United Kingdom	The ship was driven ashore at Beaumaris. She was on a voyage from Bangor, Caernarfonshire to Annan, Dumfriesshire. Jane was refloated on 15 January.
Jane	United Kingdom	The ship was severely damaged at Limerick.
Jane and Alice	United Kingdom	The ship was driven ashore and damaged at Westport.
Janet	United Kingdom	The ship was severely damaged at Limerick.
Jarrow	United Kingdom	The ship was driven ashore in Bootle Bay. She was on a voyage from Demerara, British Honduras to Liverpool.
Jean and Margaret	United Kingdom	The ship was driven ashore or damaged at Troon.
Jessie	United Kingdom	The ship was driven ashore on Inishcoo. She was later refloated.
John	United Kingdom	The ship was driven ashore at Milford Haven. She was on a voyage from Cardiff, Glamorgan to Cork.
John	United Kingdom	The ship was driven ashore in the River Dee. Her crew were rescued.
John and Ellen	United Kingdom	The ship was driven ashore at Pwllheli. She was refloated on 15 January and taken into Pwllheli.
John and Thomas	United Kingdom	The ship sank at Donaghadee. Her crew were rescued.
John Clifton	United Kingdom	The ship was driven ashore at Blackpool. She had been refloated by 1 February.
John Erskine	United Kingdom	The ship sank at Donaghadee.
Johns	United Kingdom	The ship sank at Donaghadee. Her crew were rescued.
John Weevil	United Kingdom	The ship capsized and sank at Limerick.
Jonah	United Kingdom	The ship was driven ashore near Blackpool. She had been refloated by 1 February.
Julia	United Kingdom	The ship was driven against the quayside and damaged at Bangor, Caernarfonshire.
Julia	United Kingdom	The ship was severely damaged at Limerick.
Juno	United Kingdom	The ship was driven ashore and wrecked south of Portpatrick with the loss of one life.
Kelly	United Kingdom	The ship was driven ashore at Blackpool. She had been refloated by 1 February.
Lady Agnew	United Kingdom	The ship was damaged at Donaghadee.
Lady Lovett	United Kingdom	The ship was driven onto the Perch Hawk, on the coast of County Dublin and was damaged. She was on a voyage from Dublin to Wick, Caithness.
Leila	United Kingdom	The ship was driven ashore and damaged at Benmore, County Sligo.
Le Jeune Elise	France	The ship was driven ashore in Bootle Bay. She was on a voyage from Bordeaux, Gironde to Liverpool. Le Jeune Elise was refloated on 16 January.
Leslie Galt	United Kingdom	The ship was driven ashore on Islay.
Lewtas	United Kingdom	The ship was driven ashore near Blackpool. She had been refloated by 1 February.
Lion	United Kingdom	The ship was driven ashore on Islay.
Lively	United Kingdom	The ship was driven ashore at Blackpool. She had been refloated by 1 February.
Lockwoods	United Kingdom	The ship was wrecked on the North Bank, in Liverpool Bay. Fifty-five of the 108 people on board were rescued by the Hoylake Lifeboat and the steam tug Victoria (United Kingdom).
Lonus	United Kingdom	The ship was driven ashore at Blackpool. She had been refloated by 1 February.
Lord Nelson	United Kingdom	The ship was driven ashore at Tarbert.
Magnus	United Kingdom	The ship was severely damaged at Limerick.
Margaret	United Kingdom	The ship was driven ashore and severely damaged at Strangford, County Antrim. She was refloated on 26 January and taken into Portaferry.
Margaret	United Kingdom	The ship was driven ashore at Troon. She had been refloated by 23 January.
Margaret	United Kingdom	The ship was driven ashore in the River Dee. Her crew were rescued.
Margaret and Peggy	United Kingdom	The ship was driven ashore at Blackpool. She had been refloated by 1 February.
Margaret Brown	United Kingdom	The ship was driven ashore at Troon. She had been refloated by 23 January.
Maria	United Kingdom	The ship was driven ashore at Tarbert.
Marmion	United Kingdom	The ship was driven ashore at Montrose, Forfarshire.
Martha	United Kingdom	The ship was severely damaged at Limerick.
Martin	United Kingdom	The ship was severely damaged at Limerick.
Mary	United Kingdom	The ship was driven against the quayside and severely damaged at Bangor, County Down.
Mary	United Kingdom	The ship was driven ashore at Blackpool. She had been refloated by 1 February.
Mary	United Kingdom	The sloop was driven ashore at Prestwick, Ayrshire. Her three crew were rescued by the Prestwick Lifeboat.
Mary	United Kingdom	The ship was driven ashore at Beaumaris. She was on a voyage from Bangor to Carlisle, Cumberland. Mary was refloated on 15 January.
Mary and Eleanor	United Kingdom	The ship was driven ashore at Castle Pill, Pembrokeshire and was scuttled. She was on a voyage from Cardiff to Sligo.
Mary and Elizabeth	United Kingdom	The sloop sank near Whitton, Lincolnshire. Her three crew were rescued. She was on a voyage from Hull to Gainsborough, Lincolnshire.
Mary and Patrick	United Kingdom	The ship was severely damaged at Donaghadee.
Mary Ann	United Kingdom	The ship was driven against the quayside and severely damaged at Bangor, Caernarfonshire.
Mary Ann	United Kingdom	The ship was driven ashore at Blackpool. She had been refloated by 1 February.
Mary Ann	United Kingdom	The ship was driven ashore on Islay.
Mary Curwan	United Kingdom	The ship was severely damaged at Maryport.
Mary Irving	United Kingdom	The ship was driven ashore at Beaumaris. She was on a voyage from Bangor, Caernarfonshire to Carlisle, Cumberland.
Marys	United Kingdom	The ship foundered in the North Sea off Spurn Point. Her crew were rescued.
Mary's Packet	United Kingdom	The ship sank in Loch Ryan. She was refloated on 25 January.
Medora	United Kingdom	The ship was driven ashore on Islay.
Mercury	United Kingdom	The ship was driven out to sea from Aberdeen and was abandoned. She was on a voyage from Hartlepool, County Durham to Aberdeen. Her crew were rescued.
Mermaid	United Kingdom	The pilot cutter was driven ashore at Cork.
Moira	United Kingdom	The ship was driven ashore and wrecked at Ayr. Her crew were rescued by the Ayr Lifeboat.
Mona	(United Kingdom of Great Britain and Ireland) Isle of Man	The paddle steamer was driven ashore at Liverpool.
Mona Castle	(United Kingdom of Great Britain and Ireland) Isle of Man	The ship was driven ashore and wrecked near Heysham. She was on a voyage from the Isle of Man to Liverpool.
Naperima	United Kingdom	The ship was driven ashore or damaged at Troon.
Nancy	United Kingdom	The ship was driven ashore at Portaferry.
Nancy	United Kingdom	The ship was severely damaged at Maryport.
Nancy	United Kingdom	The ship was driven ashore near Blackpool.
Nile	United Kingdom	The sloop sank near Hull, Yorkshire. She was on a voyage from Maldon, Essex to Hull. Nile was refloated on 30 January.
Odell	United Kingdom	The ship was driven ashore near Heysham. She was on a voyage from Liverpool to Sligo.
Orion	United Kingdom	The ship was driven ashore at Blackpool. She was on a voyage from Bangor to Shoreham-by-Sea, Sussex. She had been refloated by 1 February.
Oxford	United Kingdom	The ship was wrecked on the Burbo Bank, in Liverpool Bay with the loss of at least four of her crew. She was on a voyage from New York to Liverpool. Oxford was refloated on 19 January.
Oxonian	United Kingdom	The ship was severely damaged at Limerick.
Packet	United Kingdom	The brig was severely damaged at Limerick.
Pearl and Harmony	United Kingdom	The ship was driven ashore in Bootle Bay.
Pennant	United Kingdom	The sloop sank in the Irish Sea off Penrhyn Bay, Caernarfonshire.
Pennsylvania	United States	Pennsylvania, Lockwoods, and Saint Andrew. The ship was wrecked on the West Hoyle Bank with the loss of five of the 31 people on board. Survivors were rescued by the lifeboat Magazine (United Kingdom). She was on a voyage from Liverpool to New York.
Pitgavney	United Kingdom	The sloop sprang a leak and foundered in the North Sea 60 nautical miles (110 km) off Flamborough Head, Yorkshire (54°48′N 3°00′E). Her crew were rescued by the brig Crown (United Kingdom). Pitgavney was on a voyage from Stockton-on-Tees, County Durham to Newport, Monmouthshire.
Pilgrim	United Kingdom	The ship was driven ashore at Annan.
Pilot	United Kingdom	The ship was driven ashore or damaged at Troon.
Plough	p	The sloop was wrecked at Ballantrae, Ayrshire.
Pomona	Norway	The ship was driven ashore and severely damaged at Laurvig.
Providential	United Kingdom	The ship was driven ashore near Kilrush.
Queen Victoria	United Kingdom	The ship was driven ashore near Bolan's Rock. She had been refloated by 18 January.
Rainbow	United Kingdom	The ship was in collision with Exmouth (United Kingdom) and was abandoned in the North Sea. Her crew were rescued by Exmouth. Rainbow was on a voyage from Harwich, Essex to South Shields or Newcastle. She was subsequently discovered by Daniel (United Kingdom) and taken into Bridlington, Yorkshire.
Raven	United Kingdom	The ship was severely damaged at Limerick.
HMS Redwing	Royal Navy	The paddle steamer was driven ashore near Liverpool.
Ribble	United Kingdom	The steamship was wrecked at Liverpool.
Richmond Lass	United Kingdom	The ship was severely damaged at Limerick with the loss of a crew member.
R. J. Askew	United Kingdom	The schooner sank in Princes Dock, Liverpool.
Robert	United Kingdom	The ship capsized at Westport.
Robert and Alice	United Kingdom	The ship was driven ashore at Donaghadee.
Robert Hanny	United Kingdom	The ship was severely damaged at Limerick.
Roe	United Kingdom	The ship was driven ashore at Troon.
Rose	United Kingdom	The schooner was severely damaged at Portaferry.
Ruby	United Kingdom	The ship was driven ashore on Islay.
Ruthin Castle	(United Kingdom of Great Britain and Ireland) Isle of Man	The ship sank at Ardglass.
Saint	United Kingdom	The ship was driven ashore or damaged at Troon.
Salls	United Kingdom	The ship was severely damaged at Maryport.
Sally	United Kingdom	The ship was driven ashore at Blackpool. She had been refloated by 1 February.
Samuel	United Kingdom	The schooner was abandoned in the North Sea. Her four crew were rescued by Thames (United Kingdom).
Samuel and William	United Kingdom	The ship was driven ashore in the Humber downstream of Marfleet. She was on a voyage from Lyme, Dorset to Leeds, Yorkshire. Samuel and William was refloated on 14 January and taken into Hull.
Sarah	United Kingdom	The brig was driven ashore at Formby Point, Lancashire.
Sarah	United Kingdom	The ship was driven ashore at Hubberston Pill, Pembrokeshire. She was on a voyage from Newport, Monmouthshire to Pwllheli.
Sarah	United Kingdom	The ship foundered at the mouth of the River Dee with the loss of all hands.
Sarah	United Kingdom	The ship sank at Rhuddlan, Flintshire with the loss of all hands. She was refloated on 4 March and taken into Chester, Cheshire.
Sarah	United Kingdom	The ship departed from Liverpool for Galway. No further trace, presumed foundered with the loss of all hands.
Sea Witch	United Kingdom	The pilot cutter was driven ashore at Cork.
Shakespeare	United Kingdom	The ship was abandoned in the North Sea. Her crew were rescued by Elliot (United Kingdom).
HMRC Shamrock	Board of Customs	The brig foundered off Tory Island.
Speedy	United Kingdom	The ship was driven ashore at Custon Point, County Sligo.
St. Andrew	United States	The ship was wrecked on the North Bank. All 23 people on board were rescued by the lifeboat Magazine, steamship Mountaineer and steam tug Victoria (all United Kingdom). St. Andrew was on a voyage from Liverpool to New York.
Star	United Kingdom	The ship was driven ashore at Newton, Pembrokeshire. She was on a voyage from A Coruña, Spain to Liverpool.
St. George	United Kingdom	The ship was driven ashore at Strangford. She was refloated on 16 January.
St. Patrick	United Kingdom	The ship was driven ashore at Strangford. She was on a voyage from Belfast to Liverpool. St. Patrick had been refloated by 21 January.
Success	United Kingdom	The sloop was driven ashore and wrecked west of North Berwick, Berwickshire. Her crew were rescued. She was on a voyage from Eyemouth, Berwickshire to Glasgow.
Success	United Kingdom	The ship was driven ashore at Troon. She was refloated on 2 February.
Swallow	United Kingdom	The ship was driven ashore near Pwllheli. She was on a voyage from Saint John, New Brunswick to Belfast, or Waterford to Liverpool. Swallow was refloated on 15 January and taken into Pwllheli.
Swan	United Kingdom	The schooner was driven ashore at Kilrush. She had been refloated by 17 January.
HMRC Swift	Board of Customs	The cutter foundered with the loss of all on board.
Sybile	United Kingdom	The ship was driven ashore at Pwllheli. She was on a voyage from Saint John, New Brunswick, British North America to Belfast. Sybile was refloated on 15 January and taken into Pwllheli.
Sylph	United Kingdom	The ship was driven ashore at Tarbert.
Tar	United Kingdom	The ship was driven ashore at Kilrush. She had been refloated by 17 January.
Tarbert Castle	United Kingdom	The paddle steamer was driven ashore and wrecked in Ardmarnock Bay, Loch Fyne. All on board were rescued.
Tarbolton	United Kingdom	The ship was driven ashore at Troon.
Tartar	United Kingdom	The ship was severely damaged at Maryport.
Thermis	United Kingdom	The ship was driven ashore on Islay. She was on a voyage from Riga, Russia to Londonderry.
Thetis	United Kingdom	The brig was driven onto a sandbank off Dundee. Her twelve crew were rescued by Royal William (United Kingdom).
Thomas	United Kingdom	The schooner was driven out of Menai Bridge, Anglesey crewless. She was subsequently driven ashore at Southport, Lancashire.
Thomas	United Kingdom	The ship was driven ashore in Loch Indaal. She was on a voyage from Riga, Russia to Londonderry.
Thomas and Ann	United Kingdom	The ship was driven against the quayside and damaged at Bangor, Caernarfonshire.
Thomas Field	United Kingdom	The brig was driven ashore and wrecked at Port Talbot, Glamorgan with the loss of three of her eight crew. She was on a voyage from Swansea, Glamorgan to Dublin. Thomas Field broke up on 10 January.
Thomas William	United Kingdom	The ship was driven ashore and wrecked at Vlissingen, Zeeland, Netherlands. She was on a voyage from King's Lynn, Norfolk to London.
Tiger	United Kingdom	The ship was driven ashore near Ravenglass, Cumberland.
Tom	United Kingdom	The ship was driven ashore at Blackpool. She had been refloated by 1 February.
Transit	United Kingdom	The ship was damaged at Limerick.
Traveller	United Kingdom	The ship was severely damaged at Limerick.
Trial	United Kingdom	The ship was driven ashore at Holyhead.
Triton	United Kingdom	The ship was severely damaged at Limerick.
Undine	United Kingdom	The schooner was driven ashore at Kilrush with the loss of two of her crew.
Universe	United Kingdom	The ship was severely damaged at Limerick.
Venus	United Kingdom	The schooner was wrecked on the Inch Bank, in the Irish Sea. Her crew were rescued. She was on a voyage from Glasgow to Sligo.
Venus	United Kingdom	The ship was driven ashore at Portaferry.
Vernon	United Kingdom	The ship was driven ashore at Ulverstone, Lancashire.
Vestal	United Kingdom	The ship was driven ashore and damaged in the River Mersey at Liverpool. She was on a voyage from Liverpool to Constantinople, Ottoman Empire. Vestal was refloated later that day.
Victoria	United Kingdom	The ship was driven ashore at Leasowe, Cheshire. Her crew were rescued. She was on a voyage from Charleston, South Carolina to Liverpool. Victoria was refloated on 19 February and taken into the River Mersey. She was subsequently condemned.
Vigilant	United Kingdom	The ship was driven ashore at Harkness, Orkney Islands. She was refloated on 27 January and taken into Stromness.
Wasp	United Kingdom	The ship was severely damaged at Limerick.
Waterloo	United Kingdom	The ship sank at Portaferry.
Waterloo	United Kingdom	The ship was driven ashore and wrecked at Troon.
Waterloo Packet	United Kingdom	The ship was driven ashore at Troon. She was refloated on 2 February.
Welcome	United Kingdom	The ship was driven ashore at Tarbert.
William	United Kingdom	The smack sank at Donaghadee. Her crew were rescued. She was refloated on 9 January.
William and Henry	United Kingdom	The ship foundered in the North Sea off the coast of County Durham with the loss of all hands.
William and James	United Kingdom	The ship was driven ashore and wrecked on "Fowler Isle", Lancashire.
William and Mary	United Kingdom	The ship was driven ashore at Strangford. She was refloated in late January.
William IV	United Kingdom	The brig was driven ashore at Buncrana, County Donegal. Her seven crew were rescued.
Wombwell	United Kingdom	The ship was driven ashore on Islay.
Woodside	United Kingdom	The steamship was wrecked at Liverpool.
Workington	United Kingdom	The ship was driven ashore at Dublin. She was on a voyage from Dublin to Leith. Workington was later refloated.
Wreath	United Kingdom	The ship was driven ashore at Beaumaris. She was on a voyage from Chester, Cheshire to Bangor. Wreath was refloated on 15 January and resumed her voyage.
Yanco	United Kingdom	The ship was driven ashore and severely damaged at Flamborough Head, Yorkshire. She subsequently floated off crewless.
Yeoman	United Kingdom	The ship, a barque or brig was driven ashore and wrecked near Lancaster. She was on a voyage from Demerara, British Honduras to Liverpool.

== 8 January ==
List of shipwrecks: 8 January 1839
Ship	State	Description
Adonna	United Kingdom	The ship was driven ashore or damaged at Troon, Ayrshire.
Agnes	United Kingdom	The ship was driven ashore at Stranraer, Wigtownshire. She was on a voyage from Sligo to Glasgow, Renfrewshire.
Alcides	United Kingdom	The brig was abandoned in the North Sea. Her crew were rescued by Elizabeth (United Kingdom). Aloides was on a voyage from Ipswich, Suffolk to London.
Alva	United Kingdom	The brig was driven ashore at Shrewsbury, Massachusetts, United States. She was on a voyage from New York, United States to Montego Bay, Jamaica. Alva was later refloated and put back to New York for repairs.
Ann	United Kingdom	The ship sank at Porthdinllaen, Caernarfonshire. She was on a voyage from Chester, Cheshire to Cardiff, Glamorgan. She was on a voyage from the River Dee to Bristol, Gloucestershire. Ann was refloated on 13 February and resumed her voyage.
Anne	United Kingdom	The ship was driven ashore on Islay, Inner Hebrides. She was on a voyage from Liverpool, Lancashire to Donegal.
Blackness	United Kingdom	The ship was driven ashore at Glückstadt, Duchy of Holstein. She was refloated on 25 February and taken into Glückstadt.
Bradford	United Kingdom	The ship was driven ashore on Spurn Point, Yorkshire. She was on a voyage from London to Selby, Yorkshire. Bradford was refloated on 18 January and resumed her voyage.
Braganza	United Kingdom	The steamship was driven ashore in Stonehouse Pool, Plymouth, Devon. She was on a voyage from London to Lisbon, Portugal.
Campbell	United Kingdom	The ship was driven ashore and severely damaged at Schulau, Duchy of Holstein.
Cherub	United Kingdom	The ship was driven ashore at Maryport, Cumberland.
Collins	United Kingdom	The ship was driven ashore at Spurn Point, Yorkshire. She was refloated on 21 January and taken into Grimsby, Lincolnshire.
Countess of Blessington	United Kingdom	The ship was driven ashore at Stromness, Orkney Islands She was on a voyage from Newcastle upon Tyne, Northumberland to Liverpool. She was refloated on 17 January.
Cuba	Hamburg	The ship was driven ashore at Hamburg. She was on a voyage from Havana, Cuba to Hamburg.
Darling	United Kingdom	The ship was driven ashore at Maryport.
Diana	United Kingdom	The ship was driven ashore on Texel, North Holland, Netherlands and sank with the loss of all but one of her 21 crew. She was on a voyage from South Shields to London.
Dorothea	Hamburg	The ship was driven ashore at Neumuhlen. She was on a voyage from Rio de Janeiro, Brazil to Hamburg.
Elbe	Hamburg	The paddle steamer was driven ashore at Huisduinen, North Holland with the loss of two of her crew. She was on a voyage from Dunkirk, Nord, France to Dundee, Forfarshire.
Elise	Hamburg	The ship was driven ashore at Neumuhlen. She was on a voyage from Rio de Janeiro to Hamburg.
Eliza	United Kingdom	The ship was driven ashore 2 nautical miles (3.7 km) from Holywood, County Down.
Elizabeth	Hamburg	The ship was driven ashore at Hamburg.
Fair Ellen	United Kingdom	The ship foundered in the Vlie. Her crew were rescued. She was on a voyage from London to Newcastle upon Tyne, Northumberland.
Fame	United Kingdom	The ship was driven ashore on Spurn Point. She was on a voyage from London to Selby, Yorskshire. Fame was refloated on 16 February and taken into Hull, Yorkshire.
Favourite	United Kingdom	The ship was driven ashore near Hull, Yorkshire. She was on a voyage from King's Lynn, Norfolk to Hull.
Felicity	United Kingdom	The ship was driven ashore on the coast of Jutland. All on board were rescued by Lydia (United Kingdom).
Friends	United Kingdom	The ship ran aground and sank at Collier Hope, Yorkshire. She was on a voyage from Boston, Lincolnshire to Middlesbrough, Yorkshire. Friends was refloated on 16 January and taken into Whitby.
Gotha	France	The ship was driven ashore at Neumuhlen. She was on a voyage from Bordeaux, Gironde to Hamburg.
Hart	United Kingdom	The ship was driven ashore at Neumuhlen. She was on a voyage from Newport, Monmouthshire to Hamburg.
Indus	United Kingdom	The ship was abandoned in the North Sea off the coast of Jutland. Four surviving crew were rescued by Felicity (United Kingdom). Indus was on a voyage from Quebec City, Lower Canada, British North America to Newcastle upon Tyne, Northumberland.
Industry	United Kingdom	The ship foundered in the Vlie with the loss of all but two of her crew. Survivors were rescued by Progress (United Kingdom). Industry was on a voyage from Great Yarmouth, Norfolk to London.
Iris	United Kingdom	The ship was driven ashore at King's Lynn. She was on a voyage from Stockton-on-Tees, County Durham to King's Lynn. Iris was later refloated.
Jane and Maria	United Kingdom	The ship was driven ashore at Neumuhlen. She was on a voyage from Goole, Yorkshire to Hamburg.
John and Robert	United Kingdom	The ship was driven ashore on "Foula", Lancashire. She was on a voyage from Waterford to Liverpool. John and Robert was refloated on 24 January and resumed her voyage.
Julie	Hamburg	The ship was driven ashore at Hamburg.
Junge Jan	Hamburg	The ship was driven ashore at Neumuhlen. She was on a voyage from Newcastle upon Tyne to Hamburg.
Lady Hood	United Kingdom	The ship was driven ashore at Stromness. She was refloated on 17 January.
Lowndes	Netherlands	The ship was driven ashore at Hook of Holland, South Holland with the loss of all hands.
Loyalist	United Kingdom	The ship was driven ashore and wrecked near Visby, Sweden. She was on a voyage from Saint Petersburg, Russia to Liverpool.
Maria	Hamburg	The ship was driven ashore at Neumuhlen. She was on a voyage from New York to Hamburg.
Mary	United Kingdom	The ship was driven ashore at Cork. She was subsequently wrecked on 6 February.
Mermaid	United Kingdom	The ship was driven ashore 2 nautical miles (3.7 km) from Holywood.
Minerva	Netherlands	The ship was wrecked near Cherbourg, Seine-Inférieure, France. Her crew were rescued. She was on a voyage from Surinam to Amsterdam, North Holland.
Minerva	United States	The ship was driven ashore at Neumuhlen. She was on a voyage from New Bedford, Massachusetts to Hamburg.
Monkey	United Kingdom	The ship was wrecked near Formby, Lancashire with the loss of three of her crew. She was on a voyage from Liverpool, Lancashire to Gibraltar.
Ocean	Netherlands	The ship was driven ashore at Hook of Holland with the loss of all but two of her crew.
Pheasant	United Kingdom	The ship sank at the mouth of the River Dee. Her crew were rescued.
Phoenix	United Kingdom	The brig foundered in the North Sea off Berwick upon Tweed, Northumberland. Her crew were rescued.
Phœnix	United Kingdom	The ship was driven ashore at Spurn Point. She was refloated on 20 January.
Rose	United Kingdom	The ship foundered in the North Sea. Her crew were rescued by Elizabeth (United Kingdom). Rose was on a voyage from Perth to London.
Salus	United Kingdom	The ship was severely damaged at Maryport.
Sappho	United Kingdom	The brig was wrecked in Caernarvon Bay with the loss of all but one of her thirteen crew; the sole passenger on board also drowned. She was on a voyage from Demerara, British Honduras to the Clyde.
Scotia	United Kingdom	The ship was driven ashore on Islay. She was on a voyage from Glasgow, Renfrewshire to Westport, County Mayo. She was refloated on 25 January and resumed her voyage.
Star	United Kingdom	The ship was driven ashore at Stromness. She was on a voyage from Peterhead, Aberdeenshire to Belfast, County Antrim. Star was refloated on 17 January.
Swift	United Kingdom	The ship was wrecked near Southport, Lancashire. Her crew were rescued. She was on a voyage from Liverpool to Gibraltar.
Thomas and Ann	United Kingdom	The ship was driven ashore on Spurn Point. She was on a voyage from Spalding, Lincolnshire to Goole, Yorkshire.
Two Sisters	United Kingdom	The ship sank in the North Sea off Cleeness, Lincolnshire. Her crew were rescued.
Venus	Russian Empire	The ship was driven ashore and wrecked near "Grau d'Orgon", Gard, France. Her crew were rescued. She was on a voyage from a Russian port to Cette, Hérault, France.
Wassel	Russia	The ship was driven ashore at Stromness. She was on a voyage from Saint Petersburg to Liverpool. She was refloated on 17 January.
Waterloo	United Kingdom	The Humber Keel was run into by a sloop and sank at New Holland, Lincolnshire. Three crew survived.
Wellington	United Kingdom	The ship was driven ashore and wrecked at Killala, County Mayo. She was on a voyage from Saltcoats, Ayrshire to Belfast, County Antrim.

== 9 January ==
List of shipwrecks: 9 January 1839
Ship	State	Description
Activ	Rostock	The ship was wrecked on "Twersted". She was on a voyage from Rostock to Hull, Yorkshire, United Kingdom.
Arcturus	United Kingdom	The ship was driven ashore at Limerick. She was refloated on 17 February.
Economy	United Kingdom	The ship was abandoned off the Dutch coast. Her crew were rescued. She was on a voyage from Sunderland, County Durham to Portsmouth, Hampshire.
Elizabeth	United Kingdom	The ship was driven ashore at Limerick.
Gleaner	United Kingdom	The ship was wrecked on the Oosterbank, in the North Sea. Her crew were rescued. She was on a voyage from Thornham, Norfolk to London.
Hollander	Netherlands	The ship was driven ashore at Point Adderton, Massachusetts, United States. She was on a voyage from Rotterdam, South Holland to Boston, Massachusetts.
Hope	United Kingdom	The ship was driven ashore at Limerick. She was refloated on 16 January.
Isabella	United Kingdom	The ship was driven ashore at Labasheeda, County Clare. She was refloated on 14 January and taken into Kilrush.
Jane	United Kingdom	The ship was driven ashore near Blankenberge, West Flanders, Belgium with the loss of a crew member. She was on a voyage from Dunkirk, Nord to Colchester, Essex. Jane was refloated on 5 February and taken into Ostend, West Flanders.
Lord Nelson	United Kingdom	The ship was driven ashore at Limerick.
Marie Charlotte	Netherlands	The ship was driven ashore and wrecked at "Garrup". She was on a voyage from Riga, Russia to Rotterdam, South Holland.
Orb	United Kingdom	The ship was driven ashore in the "Clare River", Ireland.
Paradies	Duchy of Holstein	The ship was driven ashore 12 nautical miles (22 km) north of "Granade". She was on a voyage from Neustadt in Holstein to Newcastle upon Tyne, Northumberland, United Kingdom. She was later refloated and put into Aarhus, Denmark for repairs.
Resolution	United Kingdom	The ship ran aground on the Holm Sand, in the North Sea. She was later refloated and taken into Hull, Yorkshire.
Sisters	United Kingdom	The ship was abandoned in the North Sea off the coast of Suffolk. Her crew were rescued.
St. Patrick	United Kingdom	The ship was driven ashore at Cairnryan, Wigtownshire. She was on a voyage from Belfast, County Antrim to Liverpool, Lancashire.
Success	United Kingdom	The ship was driven ashore and wrecked at Troon, Ayrshire. She was on a voyage from Belfast to Liverpool.
Sylph	United Kingdom	The ship was driven ashore at Limerick.
Underhill	United Kingdom	The brig was wrecked at Ilfracombe, Devon. She was on a voyage from St. Ives, Cornwall to Swansea, Glamorgan.
Welcome	United Kingdom	The ship was driven ashore and damaged near Roland's Rock, County Limerick. She was refloated on 16 January.
Zeal	United Kingdom	The ship was driven ashore on the coast of Ayrshire. She was on a voyage from Ayr to a Mediterranean port.

== 10 January ==
List of shipwrecks: 10 January 1839
Ship	State	Description
Acorn	United Kingdom	The ship was wrecked near "Beymer".
Anna Margaretha	Norway	The ship was wrecked at Helsingør, Denmark. She was on a voyage from La Roche-Bernard, Morbihan, France to Skien.
Brothers	United Kingdom	The ship was abandoned in the North Sea 45 nautical miles (83 km) west by south of Lowestoft, Suffolk. Her crew were rescued by Ouse (United Kingdom).
Burnham	United Kingdom	The ship was abandoned in the Dogger Bank. Her crew were rescued by Richard and John (United Kingdom).
Colonia	Bremen	The ship was driven ashore at Hörnum, Duchy of Schleswig. Her crew were rescued. She was on a voyage from Angostura to Bremen.
Commerce	United Kingdom	The ship was abandoned in the North Sea off Texel, North Holland, Netherlands. Her crew were rescued by Sydney Packet (United Kingdom).
Confiance en Dieu	France	The ship was driven ashore on Eierland, North Holland, Netherlands. She was on a voyage from Gravelines, Nord to Newcastle upon Tyne, Northumberland, United Kingdom.
Felicity	United Kingdom	The ship was abandoned in the North Sea. All on board were rescued by Lydia (United Kingdom).
Friends	United Kingdom	The schooner was abandoned in the North Sea 60 nautical miles (110 km) off Great Yarmouth, Norfolk. Her crew were rescued by the brig Pacific (United Kingdom).
Good Intent	United Kingdom	The ship capsized in the North Sea. Her crew were rescued by Bacchus (United Kingdom).
Hope	United Kingdom	The ship ran aground on the Ower Sand, in the North Sea and sank. She was refloated on 14 January in a waterlogged condition.
John and Elizabeth	United Kingdom	The ship was abandoned in the North Sea. Her crew were rescued. She was on a voyage from Great Yarmouth to Leith, Lothian.
Malvina	United Kingdom	The ship was driven ashore at Zierikzee, Zeeland, Netherlands with the loss of a crew member. She was on a voyage from Goole, Yorkshire to London.
Margaret	United Kingdom	The ship was wrecked on the Gunfleet Sand, in the North Sea off the coast of Essex. Her crew were rescued. She was on a voyage from South Shields, County Durham to London.
New Dove	United Kingdom	The ship was abandoned in the Dogger Bank. Her crew were rescued.
Pelican	United Kingdom	The ship foundered 50 nautical miles (93 km) south south west of Ostend, West Flanders, Belgium. Her crew were rescued. She was on a voyage from King's Lynn, Norfolk to London.
Sarah	United Kingdom	The brig was wrecked near Clee Ness, Lincolnshire. Her crew were rescued. She was on a voyage from London to Gainsborough, Lincolnshire. She was refloated on 21 January and taken into Grimsby.
Swansea Packet	United Kingdom	The ship was driven ashore east of Carlow Point.
Therese	Duchy of Holstein	The ship was driven ashore crewless on the west coast of Jutland. She was on a voyage from Hamburg to Antwerp, Belgium.
Vrow Siever	Bremen	The ship was driven ashore on Sylt, Duchy of Schleswig. She was on a voyage from Bremen to Antwerp, Belgium.
William	United Kingdom	The ship was abandoned in the North Sea 60 nautical miles (110 km) off Great Yarmouth. Her crew were rescued by the brig Pacific (United Kingdom).
William and Mary	United Kingdom	The ship was blown out to sea from Bridlington, Yorkshire without any crew on board.

== 11 January ==
List of shipwrecks: 11 January 1839
Ship	State	Description
Airie	United Kingdom	The ship was driven ashore at Hamburg.
Cecili	Hamburg	The ship was driven ashore at Hamburg.
Ceres, and George Blakelock	United Kingdom	The ship and brig were in collision off Aldeburgh, Suffolk and both sank.
Christine	Hamburg	The ship was driven ashore at Hamburg.
Diana	Hamburg	
Dido	Hamburg	The ship was driven ashore at Hamburg.
Ellen	United Kingdom	The barque capsized in the River Thames at Rotherhithe, Kent and was severely damaged. Her crew were rescued.
Helene	Hamburg	The ship was driven ashore at Hamburg.
Johnannis	Hamburg	The ship was driven ashore at Hamburg.
John and William	United Kingdom	The ship was driven ashore at Egmond aan Zee, North Holland, Netherlands with the loss of all but three of her crew. She was on a voyage from London to Hull, Yorkshire.
King George	United Kingdom	The ship foundered in the North Sea off the coast of Norfolk. She was on a voyage from Great Yarmouth, Norfolk to Portsmouth, Hampshire.
Lady Keith	United Kingdom	The ship was lost near Brindisi, Kingdom of the Two Sicilies. Her crew were rescued. She was on a voyage from Ancona, Papal States to London.
Leander	United Kingdom	The ship was driven ashore and wrecked between The Manacles and Blackhead, Cornwall. Her crew were rescued. She was on a voyage from Malta to Falmouth, Cornwall.
Medes	Hamburg	The ship was driven ashore at Hamburg.
Nancy	United Kingdom	The ship was driven ashore on the coast of Texel, North Holland. Her crew were rescued. She was on a voyage from Hull to Rotterdam, South Holland, Netherlands.
Navy	United Kingdom	The ship was driven ashore at Hamburg.
Orleans	United States	The ship was driven ashore at Maryport, Cumberland, United Kingdom. She was on a voyage from Baltimore, Maryland to Liverpool, Lancashire, United Kingdom. Orleans was refloated the next day and taken into Maryport.
Pultney	France	The ship was driven ashore at Hamburg.
Rose	United Kingdom	The smack was abandoned in the North Sea. Her crew were rescued by the brig Pelican (United Kingdom).
Soderhamn	Hamburg	The ship was driven ashore at Neumuhlen. She was on a voyage from Marseille, Bouches-du-Rhône, France to Hamburg.
Sophie	United Kingdom	The ship was abandoned in the Atlantic Ocean. Her crew were rescued by the steamship Britannia (United Kingdom). Sophie was on a voyage from Cairo, Egypt to Hull.
Timo and Hector	Hamburg	The ship was driven ashore at Hamburg. She was on a voyage from Hamburg to Port-au-Prince, Haiti.
Triton	Hamburg	The ship was driven ashore at Hamburg.
Union	France	The ship was driven ashore at Neumuhlen. She was on a voyage from Havre de Grâce, Seine-Inférieure to Hamburg.
Venus	United Kingdom	The ship was driven ashore at Neumuhlen. She was on a voyage from Alicante, Spain to Hamburg.

== 12 January ==
List of shipwrecks: 12 January 1839
Ship	State	Description
Alfader	Norway	The schooner capsized off Lyngør and was driven ashore. She was on a voyage from Lyngør to Le Tréport, Seine-Inférieure, France.
Caroline	United Kingdom	The ship was driven ashore on Terschelling. Twelve of her crew were rescued. She was on a voyage from Great Yarmouth, Norfolk to a Scottish port.
Emerald	United Kingdom	The ship was driven ashorein Llandudno Bay. Her crew were rescued.
Enterprise	United Kingdom	The ship was driven ashore and wrecked in Llandudno Bay. Her crew were rescued.
Fanny	United Kingdom	The ship was driven ashore near Gothenburg Sweden. She was on a voyage from Riga, Russia to Hull, Yorkshire.
Hedleys	United Kingdom	The ship was abandoned in the North Sea. Her crew were rescued by George and Jane (United Kingdom).
Jay	United Kingdom	The ship was driven ashore and damaged on Inchcolm, in the Firth of Forth. She was on a voyage from Grangemouth, Stirlingshire to Newcastle upon Tyne, Northumberland. Jay was refloated and put into Burntisland, Fife for repairs.
John Hughes	United Kingdom	The ship was driven ashore in Llandudno Bay. Her crew were rescued.
Magnet	United Kingdom	The ship was abandoned in the North Sea off Hellevoetsluis, Zeeland, Netherlands. Her crew were rescued. She was on a voyage from Maldon, Essex to Goole, Yorkshire.
Rollersma	Russia	The brig was driven ashore in Stokes Bay.

== 13 January ==
List of shipwrecks: 13 January 1839
Ship	State	Description
Arethusa	United Kingdom	The ship was driven ashore at "Blandsund". She was on a voyage from Newcastle upon Tyne, Northumberland to Montrose, Forfarshire.
Eleanor Laidman	United States	The ship was wrecked on the Sorranilla Reef. Her crew survived. She was on a voyage from Santa Marta, Republic of New Granada to Mobile, Alabama.
Friendship	United Kingdom	The ship was abandoned in the North Sea. She was on a voyage from Newcastle upon Tyne to Great Yarmouth, Norfolk. Friendship was subsequently towed into Great Yarmouth by the steamship Tourist (United Kingdom).
Juffrow Ynske	Netherlands	The ship was wrecked on the Barnaard Sandbank, in the North Sea off the coast of Zeeland. Her crew were rescued. She was on a voyage from London to Rotterdam, South Holland.
Leader	United Kingdom	The ship was driven ashore on the Nore. She was on a voyage from Newcastle upon Tyne to Marseille, Bouches-du-Rhône, France. Leader was later refloated.
Patience	United Kingdom	The brig was abandoned off the Willibank, in the North Sea. Her crew were rescued by Bramham (United Kingdom). Patience was on a voyage from Liverpool, Lancashire to Sunderland, County Durham. She was driven ashore on Scharhörn on 23 January, where she was wrecked.
Patriot	United Kingdom	The ship was driven ashore and wrecked near Hedwigenkoog, Duchy of Holstein. Her crew were rescued. She was on a voyage from London to Newcastle upon Tyne.
Ratvisan	Denmark	The ship was driven ashore in Stokes Bay. She was on a voyage from Helsingør to Málaga, Spain. Ratvisan was refloated on 13 January and put into Cowes, Isle of Wight, United Kingdom.
Telegraph	United Kingdom	The ship was wrecked on the Well Bank, in the North Sea. Her crew were rescued.

== 14 January ==
List of shipwrecks: 14 January 1839
Ship	State	Description
Eden	United Kingdom	The ship struck a rock in Port Kerry Bay and was damaged. She was on a voyage from Quebec City, Lower Canada, British North America to Chepstow, Monmouthshire. Eden was subsequently towed into Newport, Monmouthshire.
Hazard	United Kingdom	The ship was wrecked on the Northern Two Keys. All on board were rescued. She was on a voyage from Nassau, Bahamas to Jamaica.
Johanna Abegg	Danzig	The ship was wrecked on the coast of Jutland. She was on a voyage from Danzig to Amsterdam, North Holland, Netherlands.
Mariette Lachaud	France	The ship was wrecked in the Cape Verde Islands. All on board were rescued. She was on a voyage from Marseille, Bouches-du-Rhône to Montevideo, Uruguay.
Richard and Ann	United Kingdom	The ship was driven ashore and wrecked at Beachy Head, Sussex.
Wanderer	United Kingdom	The sloop was driven ashore at Marfleet, Yorkshire. The one crew member on board was rescued. She later floated off. Wanderer was on a voyage from Hull to Leeds and Wakefield, Yorkshire.

== 15 January ==
List of shipwrecks: 15 January 1839
Ship	State	Description
Amity	United Kingdom	The ship was driven ashore at Sunk Island, Yorkshire. Her crew were rescued. She was on a voyage from Goole, Yorkshire to Ipswich, Suffolk.
Chancellors	United Kingdom	The ship was driven ashore on Terschelling, Friesland, Netherlands. Her crew were rescued. She was on a voyage from Aberdeen to Newcastle upon Tyne, Northumberland.
Children	(United Kingdom of Great Britain and Ireland) Van Diemen's Land	The barque was driven ashore and wrecked 70 nautical miles (130 km) east of Portland Bay with the loss of sixteen of the 32 people on board. She was on a voyage from Launceston to a port in South Australia.
Ditchburn	United Kingdom	The ship foundered in the North Sea 15 nautical miles (28 km) north east of Cromer, Norfolk with the loss of all but two of her nine crew.
Emily	United Kingdom	The ship struck the Crow Rock and capsized. She was on a voyage from Strangford, County Antrim to Balbriggan, County Dublin. Emily was late refloated and taken into Strangford.
Fisher	United Kingdom	The ship was driven ashore at Saltfleet, Lincolnshire. She was on a voyage from Wisbech, Cambridgeshire to Leith, Lothian.
Frederica Wilhelmina	Denmark	The ship was driven ashore between Boulogne and Étaples, Pas-de-Calais, France with the loss of two of her crew. She subsequently became a wreck. Frederica Wilhelmina was on a voyage from Lisbon, Portugal to Copenhagen.
Grace	United Kingdom	The ship was driven ashore at Katwijk aan Zee, South Holland, Netherlands. She was on a voyage from London to Seaham, County Durham.
Husdell	United Kingdom	The ship was driven ashore at Katwijk aan Zee. Her crew were rescued. She was on a voyage from London to Sunderland, County Durham.
Louisa Amalia	Stettin	The ship foundered in the North Sea off Thisted, Denmark. She was on a voyage from Stettin to London, United Kingdom.

== 16 January ==
List of shipwrecks: 16 January 1839
Ship	State	Description
Diana	Netherlands	The full-rigged ship was destroyed by fire at Willemsoord, North Holland.
Eden	United Kingdom	The ship ran aground off Bucksea Point, Wales and was consequently abandoned by her crew off Newport, Monmouthshire. She was on a voyage from Miramichi, New Brunswick to Chepstow, Monmouthshire. Eden was later towed into Newport by the tug Hercules (United Kingdom).
Helen	United Kingdom	The ship was driven ashore in the Sound of Islay. She was on a voyage from London to Drogheda, County Louth. Helen was refloated on 18 January and taken into Portaskaig, Islay.
Mercury	United Kingdom	The ship was driven ashore at Thisted, Denmark.
Seraphine	France	The ship foundered. Her crew were rescued.

== 17 January ==
List of shipwrecks: 17 January 1839
Ship	State	Description
Argo	United Kingdom	The ship was driven ashore on Terschelling, Friesland, Netherlands. Her crew were rescued. She was on a voyage from Great Yarmouth, Norfolk to Newcastle upon Tyne, Northumberland.
Arminia	United Kingdom	The ship was driven ashore near Rye, Sussex. She was refloated on 30 January and taken into Rye.
Byron	United Kingdom	The brigantine was run down and sunk in Liverpool Bay by the steamship Duchess of Kent (United Kingdom).
Commerce	United Kingdom	The ship was abandoned in the Dogger Bank. Her crew were rescued.
Corsair	United Kingdom	The ship was driven ashore on the Island of Helesay, French Algeria and wrecked. Her crew were rescued. She was on a voyage from Glasgow, Renfrewshire to Malta.
Enterprize	United Kingdom	The ship was driven ashore at Great Yarmouth, Norfolk. She was on a voyage from Selby, East Riding of Yorkshire to London.
Hart	United Kingdom	The ship was damaged by fire at "Neumühlen".
Providence Goodwill	United Kingdom	The ship was abandoned in the North Sea off 65 nautical miles (120 km) east by north of the Dudgeon Lightship ( Trinity House). Her crew were rescued by Eagle (United Kingdom).
Samuel Elwess	United Kingdom	The ship was abandoned in the North Sea. Her crew were rescued by Thames (United Kingdom). Samuel Elwess was on a voyage from Boston, Lincolnshire to Leith, Lothian.
Zebra	United Kingdom	The ship struck the pier and sank at Newhaven, Sussex. Her crew were rescued. She was on a voyage from Ipswich, Suffolk to Liverpool, Lancashire. She was refloated on 23 January

== 18 January ==
List of shipwrecks: 18 January 1839
Ship	State	Description
Baltic Merchant	United Kingdom	The ship ran aground on the Newcombe Sand, in the North Sea off the coast of Norfolk. She was refloated and taken into Lowestoft, Suffolk.
Bertha	Hamburg	The ship was driven ashore on Amrum, Duchy of Schleswig. She was on a voyage from Rio de Janeiro, Brazil to Hamburg. Bertha was later refloated and taken into Hamburg.
Christina	United Kingdom	The ship was wrecked on the Goodwin Sands, Kent. She was on a voyage from South Shields, County Durham to Algiers, Algeria.
Dorothea	Hamburg	The ship capsized at "Neumühlen".
Jeune Victor	France	The ship foundered off Dunkirk, Nord. She was on a voyage from Newcastle upon Tyne to Rouen, Seine-Inférieure.
John	United Kingdom	The ship was driven ashore at Filey Bridge, Yorkshire.
Sir Sydney Smith	United Kingdom	The ship was driven ashore and wrecked at Worthing, Sussex.

== 19 January ==
List of shipwrecks: 19 January 1839
Ship	State	Description
Augusta	France	The ship ran aground off Ostend, West Flanders, Belgium. She was on a voyage from Bordeaux, Gironde to Antwerp, Belgium. Augusta was refloated and put into Vlissingen, Zeeland, Netherlands.
Betsey and Nancy	United Kingdom	The ship was lost off the Tuskar Rock. Her crew were rescued. She was on a voyage from Swansea, Glamorgan to Kinsale, County Cork.
Commodore	United Kingdom	The ship was driven ashore at Weymouth, Dorset. Her crew were rescued. She was on a voyage from London to Exeter, Devon. Commodore was refloated on 24 January and taken into Weymouth.
Energy	United Kingdom	The ship was driven ashore and wrecked at Ramsgate, Kent. Her crew were rescued. She was on a voyage from London to Malta.
Fame	United Kingdom	The ship ran aground on the Barnard Sand, in the North Sea off the coast of Norfolk. She was later refloated and taken into Great Yarmouth, Norfolk.
Favourite	United Kingdom	The ship caught fire off Sea Palling, Norfolk and was abandoned. Her crew were rescued by a boat sent out from Winterton-on-Sea.
John and Mary	United Kingdom	The ship was driven ashore and wrecked at Filey Bridge, Yorkshire. Her crew were rescued. She was on a voyage from London to South Shields, County Durham.
Juliana	United Kingdom	The ship wrecked at 5p.m. at Green Point, Cape Town, in perfectly clear weather. Her crew and the 241 immigrants she was carrying to Sydney were all saved.
Mayoress	United Kingdom	The ship was driven ashore at Newhaven, Sussex. She was on a voyage from Sunderland to Newhaven.
Mercurius	United Kingdom	The ship struck the pier at Ramsgate and was damaged. She put into Broadstairs, Kent.
Rosebank	United Kingdom	The ship was driven ashore whilst on a voyage from Loch Ryan to Charleston, South Carolina, United States. She was refloated and put into Belfast, County Antrim.

== 20 January ==
List of shipwrecks: 20 January 1839
Ship	State	Description
Armenia	United Kingdom	The ship was driven ashore at Ramsgate, Kent. She was on a voyage from London to Sunderland, County Durham.
Ceres	United Kingdom	The ship was driven ashore at Newhaven, Sussex. She was refloated on 23 January and taken into Newhaven.
Good Intent	(United Kingdom of Great Britain and Ireland) British North America	The ship was wrecked at Stout Cove, Nova Scotia. Her crew were rescued. She was on a voyage from Saint John, New Brunswick to Yarmouth, Nova Scotia.
Henry	United Kingdom	The ship ran aground on the Cornel Mawr Sand, in the Bristol Channel. She was refloated on 14 February and taken into Llanelly, Glamorgan.
Isabella	United Kingdom	The ship was driven ashore on Zante, United States of the Ionian Islands. She was on a voyage from Zante to Cephalonia. Isabella was later refloated and resumed her voyage.
Mary	United Kingdom	The ship was driven ashore at Maryport, Cumberland. She was on a voyage from Chepstow, Monmouthshire to Maryport.
Mary Ann	United Kingdom	The ship ran aground off Port Talbot, Glamorgan. She was on a voyage from Bridgwater, Somerset to Port Talbot. Mary Ann was refloated on 28 January.
Susan and Sarah	United Kingdom	The ship ran aground at Llanelly, Glamorgan. She was on a voyage from Gloucester to Llanelly.
Tiffen	United Kingdom	The ship was driven ashore near the Pill Lighthouse, Lancashire and was abandoned by her crew. She was on a voyage from Whitehaven, Cumberland to Londonderry. Tiffen floated off and sank.

== 21 January ==
List of shipwrecks: January 1839
Ship	State	Description
Dart	United Kingdom	The ship was driven ashore at Penarth, Glamorgan. She was on a voyage from Bristol, Gloucestershire to Topsham, Devon. Dart was refloated the next day and resumed her voyage.
Enterprise	United Kingdom	The ship ran aground on the South Gar, in the North Sea, and sank. Her crew were rescued. She was on a voyage from Stockton-on-Tees, County Durham to Newcastle upon Tyne, Northumberland.
Good Intent	United Kingdom	The ship was driven ashore and damaged at Brancaster, Norfolk. She was on a voyage from Newcastle upon Tyne to King's Lynn, Norfolk. She was later refloated and taken into Brancaster.
Patience	United Kingdom	The brig was wrecked on the Wees Sand, in the North Sea.

== 22 January ==
List of shipwrecks: 22 January 1839
Ship	State	Description
Anson	United Kingdom	The ship was driven ashore on Terschelling, Friesland, Netherlands with the loss of all hands.
Cordelia	United Kingdom	The ship ran aground on the West Hoyle Bank, in Liverpool Bay. She was on a voyage from Liverpool, Lancashire to China. Cordelia was refloated the next day and put back to Liverpool.
Dove	United Kingdom	The ship was wrecked on the Heaps Sandbank, in the North Sea. Her crew were rescued by Eight (United Kingdom).
Emulator	United Kingdom	The brig was wrecked at the Cordouan Lighthouse, Gironde, France with the loss of three of her six crew. She was on a voyage from Dartmouth, Devon to Bordeaux, Gironde.
Jane	United Kingdom	The ship was driven ashore and wrecked at Whitby, Yorkshire. She was on a voyage from South Shields, County Durham to Lyme, Dorset.
Mary Jane	United Kingdom	The ship ran aground near "Blexum". She was on a voyage from Bremen to Sunderland, County Durham. Mary Jane was later refloated and put back to Bremen.
Waldemar	Flag unknown	The ship was driven ashore near Strömstadt, Sweden. She was on a voyage from Hull, Yorkshire to "Kjerkminde". Waldemar was later refloated.

== 23 January ==
List of shipwrecks: 23 January 1839
Ship	State	Description
Cordelia	United Kingdom	The ship ran aground on the West Hoyle Bank, in Liverpool Bay. She was on a voyage from Liverpool, Lancashire to Canton, China. Cordelia was refloated and taken into Liverpool.
Enfant Cheri	France	The ship was driven ashore on the Ness Sands, in the Bristol Channel. She was on a voyage from Nantes, Loire Atlantique to Bristol, Gloucestershire, United Kingdom.
Frederick John	United Kingdom	The ship was driven ashore at Youghal, County Cork.
Jules	France	The ship ran aground on the Walvischbank, in the North Sea off the coast of Zeeland, Netherlands. She was on a voyage from Newcastle upon Tyne, Northumberland, United Kingdom to Saint-Malo, Ille-et-Vilaine.
Little John	United Kingdom	The ship was driven ashore at Youghal, County Cork. She was on a voyage from Youghal to London.
Nancy Gwan	United Kingdom	The ship was abandoned of Cape Horn, Chile. Her crew were rescued by Gretry (France).
Robert	United Kingdom	The ship foundered off Port Isaac, Cornwall.
Tiffen	United Kingdom	The ship ran aground off the Pill Lighthouse and was abandoned by her crew. She was on a voyage from Whitehaven, Cumberland to Londonderry. Tiffen subsequently floated off and sank.
Union	United Kingdom	The ship ran aground on the Ryde Sand, in the Solent. She was on a voyage from London to Southampton, Hampshire. She was later refloated and resumed her voyage.

== 24 January ==
List of shipwrecks: 24 January 1839
Ship	State	Description
Auguste	Rostock	The ship ran aground off "Stevens". She was on a voyage from Rostock to Newcastle upon Tyne, Northumberland, United Kingdom. Auguste was later refloated and taken into Copenhagen, Denmark.
Clara	United Kingdom	The ship ran aground at Goeree, Zeeland, Netherlands. She was on a voyage from Rotterdam, South Holland, Netherlands to Hull, Yorkshire. Clara was refloated and put into Vlissingen, Zeeland.
Niger	France	The ship was wrecked on Formentera, Canary Islands. She was on a voyage from Marseille, Bouches-du-Rhône to Senegal.
Senegalais	France	The ship was driven ashore near Dénia, Spain, where she was subsequently wrecked. She was on a voyage from Marseille to Maranhão, Brazil.

== 25 January ==
List of shipwrecks: 25 January 1839
Ship	State	Description
Bonnie Dundee Lass	United Kingdom	The ship foundered in the North Sea off Schiermonnikoog, Friesland, Netherlands.
Speedy	United Kingdom	The ship was driven onto rocks at Mount Batten, Devon. She was later refloated and taken into Plymouth, Devon.

== 26 January ==
List of shipwrecks: 26 January 1839
Ship	State	Description
Ann and Jane	United Kingdom	The ship ran aground on the Burbo Bank, in Liverpool Bay. She was on a voyage from Liverpool, Lancashire to Berbice, British Guiana. Ann and Jane was refloated the next day and resumed her voyage.
Arcturus	Netherlands	The brig foundered in the North Sea. She was on a voyage from Rotterdam, South Holland to London, United Kingdom.
Catherine and Mary	United Kingdom	The ship was driven ashore at Breaksea Point, Glamorgan. She was on a voyage from Porthmadog, Caernarfonshire to Gloucester. Catherine and Mary was later refloated and beached at Penarth, Glamorgan.
Hotspur	United Kingdom	The ship was abandoned in the North Sea. She was on a voyage from Rotterdam to London.
Janet	United Kingdom	The ship was driven ashore at Bridlington, Yorkshire. She was on a voyage from Dover, Kent to Newcastle upon Tyne, Northumberland.

== 27 January ==
List of shipwrecks: 27 January 1839
Ship	State	Description
Aurora	United Kingdom	The ship was driven ashore and wrecked in Man of War's Bay, Bahamas with the loss of two of her crew.
Cinderella	(United Kingdom of Great Britain and Ireland) British North America	The ship capsized in the Atlantic Ocean (40°00′N 59°30′W). Her crew were rescued on 14 February by Mary Walker (United Kingdom). Cinderella was on a voyage from Halifax, Nova Scotia to Trinidad.
Guess	United Kingdom	The ship ran aground off Margate, Kent. She was on a voyage from Rotterdam, South Holland, Netherlands to London. Guess was later refloated and taken in tow for London.

== 28 January ==
List of shipwrecks: 28 January 1839
Ship	State	Description
David Cannon	United Kingdom	The ship was driven ashore and wrecked at Odesa.
Helen	United Kingdom	The schooner 'was wrecked at Hartlepool, County Durham. Her crew were rescued. She was on a voyage from Aberdeen to Hartlepool.
Mary Muir	United Kingdom	The ship was wrecked in the Dardanelles. She was on a voyage from Cardiff, Glamorgan to Constantinople, Ottoman Empire.
Stewart	United Kingdom	The ship struck the pier at Donaghadee, County Down and was beached.

== 29 January ==
List of shipwrecks: 29 January 1839
Ship	State	Description
Star	United Kingdom	The schooner was driven ashore and wrecked at Whitburn, County Durham. She was on a voyage from Sunderland, County Durham to Aberdeen.

== 30 January ==
List of shipwrecks: 30 January 1839
Ship	State	Description
Active	United Kingdom	The sloop was driven ashore at Newhaven, Lothian. Her three crew were rescued. She was on a voyage from Charleston, South Carolina, United States to Leith, Lothian.
Barbara	United Kingdom	The sloop was wrecked at Lindisfarne, Northumberland.
Elizabeth and Mary	United Kingdom	The ship was driven ashore at North Shields, County Durham.
Good Design	United Kingdom	The sloop was wrecked at Lindisfarne.
Henry	United Kingdom	The ship ran aground on the Cornel Mason Sands, in the Bristol Channel off the coast of Glamorgan.
Hercules	United Kingdom	The barque was driven ashore and wrecked at Leasowe, Cheshire with the loss of all hands. She was on a voyage from Maryport, Cumberland to Sierra Leone.
La Perouse	France	The brig was driven ashore and wrecked at Honfleur, Calvados.
Lee	United Kingdom	The ship foundered in the North Sea off Cromer, Norfolk with the loss of all but her captain.
Lion	United Kingdom	The barque was driven ashore on the Red Noses.
Mary Ann	United Kingdom	The ship was wrecked at Stranraer, Wigtownshire.
Mosley	United Kingdom	The ship was driven ashore at Middlesbrough, Yorkshire.
Orbitt	United Kingdom	The ship was driven ashore at Bridlington, Yorkshire. She was later refloated.
Sarah Ann	United Kingdom	The ship ran aground on the Owers Sandbank, in the English Channel off the coast of Sussex. She was on a voyage from London to Cardiff, Glamorgan. Sarah Ann was later refloated and resumed her voyage.
Union	United Kingdom	The sloop was wrecked at Lindisfarne.

== 31 January ==
List of shipwrecks: 31 January 1839
Ship	State	Description
Barbara	United Kingdom	The ship was driven ashore and wrecked at Holyhead, Anglesey. Her crew were rescued.
Brothers	United Kingdom	The ship was severely damaged at Holyhead.
Byker	United Kingdom	The ship was driven ashore near Hoylake, Lancashire. She was on a voyage from Trieste to Liverpool, Lancashire. Byker was refloated the next day and taken into Liverpool.
Defiance	United Kingdom	The ship was driven ashore near Hartlepool, County Durham. Her crew were rescued. She was refloated on 20 April and towed into Blyth, Northumberland.
Eindragt	Belgium	The ship ran aground on the Lapper Sand in the Baltic Sea. She was on a voyage from Riga, Russia to Bruges, West Flanders. Eindragt was later refloated and put into Helsingør, Denmark.
Ellen	United Kingdom	The ship was wrecked at Hartlepool. Her crew were rescued.
Express	United Kingdom	The ship was driven ashore near Scarborough. Her crew were rescued by the Scarborough Lifeboat. She was on a voyage from Newcastle upon Tyne, Northumberland to Dundee, Forfarshire. Express was refloated on 14 February and taken into Scarborough.
Intrepid	France	The ship was driven ashore at Le Tréport, Seine-Inférieure. Her crew were rescued. She was on a voyage from Bahia, Brazil to Havre de Grâce, Seine-Inférieure.
Jane	United Kingdom	The ship was driven ashore at Point of Ayr, Cheshire. Her crew were rescued. She was on a voyage from "Balgraggon" to Chester, Cheshire.
John and Mary	United Kingdom	The ship was severely damaged at Holyhead.
Juste	France	The ship was wrecked at Paimbœuf, Loire-Inférieure. She was on a voyage from Granville, Manche to the Antilles.
Lisbon Packet	United Kingdom	The ship was severely damaged at Holyhead.
London Trader	United Kingdom	The ship ran aground at Holyhead. She was later refloated.
Lord Grey	United Kingdom	The ship was driven ashore and wrecked at Wells-next-the-Sea, Norfolk. She was on a voyage from Newcastle upon Tyne to Wells-next-the-Sea.
Nelly	United Kingdom	The ship was beached in the Farne Islands.
Ranger	United Kingdom	The ship was driven ashore at Hoylake. She was on a voyage from London to Liverpool.
Sons	United Kingdom	The ship was damaged at Holyhead.
Tay	United Kingdom	The ship was severely damaged at Holyhead.
Thomas and Mary	United Kingdom	The ship was driven ashore at Holyhead, Anglesey. She was on a voyage from Aberavon, Glamorgan to Liverpool.
Union	United Kingdom	The ship was driven ashore at Holyhead. Her crew were rescued.

== Unknown date ==
List of shipwrecks: Unknown date in January 1839
Ship	State	Description
Albion	United Kingdom	The ship was driven ashore in the River Shannon. She was on a voyage from Limerick to London.
Alert	United Kingdom	The ship was wrecked near Sunderland, County Durham.
Alexander	United Kingdom	The ship was abandoned in the North Sea 60 nautical miles (110 km) off Flamborough Head, Yorkshire. She was on a voyage from Leith, Lothian to Southampton, Hampshire.
Anna and Success	United Kingdom	The ship was driven ashore near North Berwick, Berwickshire. She was on a voyage from Eyemouth, Berwickshire to Glasgow, Renfrewshire.
Anne	United Kingdom	The ship was presumed to have foundered, probably during the Night of the Big Wind.
Arno	United Kingdom	The brig was abandoned in the North Sea 50 nautical miles (93 km) off Texel, North Holland, Netherlands. Her crew were rescued by a Finnish ship.
Atalanta	United Kingdom	The ship was driven ashore near Scheveningen, South Holland, Netherlands. She was on a voyage from Sunderland to London.
Benham	United Kingdom	The ship was abandoned in the North Sea. Her crew were rescued.
Britannia	United Kingdom	The ship was driven ashore at Sligo. She had been refloated by 18 January.
Buitenwerf	Netherlands	The ship was driven ashore on the south coast of Terschelling, Friesland. She was on a voyage from Harlingen, Friesland to a Scottish port.
Brothers	United Kingdom	The ship was driven ashore on the Mere Sand.
Brothers	United Kingdom	The ship was driven ashore and wrecked on Flotta, Orkney Islands. She was on a voyage from Thurso, Caithness to Loch Ruque.
Caroline	United Kingdom	The ship ran aground on the Haaks Sandbank, in the North Sea, She was refloated but subsequently ran aground on the Sunderwall, off the Dutch coast. Caroline was on a voyage from London to Liverpool, Lancashire.
China	(United Kingdom of Great Britain and Ireland) British North America	The ship was abandoned in the Atlantic Ocean on or before 10 January.
Choctaw	United Kingdom	The ship was lost on or before 26 January.
City of Perth	United Kingdom	The ship was driven ashore at Hamburg. She was refloated on 22 January.
Clarisse	France	The ship was abandoned before 12 January. Her crew were rescued. She was on a voyage from Dunkirk, Nord to St. Ubes, Portugal.
Confidence	United Kingdom	The ship was driven ashore at Sligo. She had been refloated by 18 January.
Coriolanus	United Kingdom	The ship ran aground on the Haaks Bank, in the North Sea and was consequently beached at Den Helder, North Holland. She was on a voyage from London to Newcastle upon Tyne. Coriolanus was refloated on 22 January and taken into the Nieuw Diep.
Cygnet	United Kingdom	The ship was driven ashore at Porthdinllaen, Caernarfonshire with the loss of a crew member.
Diamond	United Kingdom	The smack was driven ashore on Soldier's Point, County Louth. She was refloated on 3 January. Diamond was on a voyage from Liverpool, Lancashire to Newry, County Antrim.
Diligence	United Kingdom	The ship was driven ashore on No Man's Land before 12 January.
Durham	United Kingdom	The ship was abandoned in the North Sea. She was towed into Lowestoft, Suffolk on 22 January by Providence (United Kingdom).
Eliza	United Kingdom	The ship was driven ashore and severely damaged near Honfleur, Calvados, France before 3 January. She was refloated on 4 January and taken into Honfleur.
Eliza	United Kingdom	The ship foundered in the North Sea before 26 January. She was on a voyage from Goole, Yorkshire to London.
Elizabeth	United Kingdom	The ship was driven ashore at Warrenpoint, County Down. She was refloated on 19 January.
Enigheten	Flag unknown	The ship was severely damaged at Gothenburg, Sweden.
Everthorpe	United Kingdom	The ship was driven ashore and wrecked at Stromness, Orkney Islands. She was on a voyage from Saint Petersburg, Russia to Liverpool.
Fame	United Kingdom	The ship was abandoned in the North Sea 100 nautical miles (190 km) east of the May Lighthouse. Her crew were rescued by Jan Frederick (flag unknown). Fame was on a voyage from Newcastle upon Tyne to Aberdeen.
Farrier	(United Kingdom of Great Britain and Ireland) Tobago	The ship foundered between Grenada and Trinidad before 6 January. Her crew were rescued.
Fortitude	United Kingdom	The ship was wrecked on the Jadder Bank, in the North Sea before 18 January. She was on a voyage from Leith, Lothian to Lerwick, Shetland Islands.
Frederick	United Kingdom	The ship was driven ashore near Llanelly, Glamorgan. She was on a voyage from Nantes, Loire-Inférieure, France to Bristol, Gloucestershire. Frederick was refloated on 3 January.
Gannet	United Kingdom	The ship was driven ashore at Rhoscolyn, Anglesey. She was refloated on 22 January and taken into Holyhead.
Grace	United Kingdom	The ship was driven ashore in Roaring Water Bay. She was on a voyage from Virginia, United States to Liverpool. Grace was later refloated and resumed her voyage.
Hedleys	United Kingdom	The ship was driven ashore derelict on the west coast of Jutland.
Hercules	United Kingdom	The ship was driven ashore on Spurn Point, Yorkshire.
Hertha	Hamburg	The ship was driven ashore on Amrum, Duchy of Schleswig. She was on a voyage from Rio de Janeiro, Brazil to Hamburg. Hertha was later refloated and put into Cuxhaven, where she arrived on 20 January.
Hirondelle	France	The ship was driven ashore and wrecked at Port Dauphiné, Madagascar before 19 January. She was on a voyage from Île Bourbon to Madagascar.
Hope	United Kingdom	The ship was abandoned in the North Sea before 18 January. Her crew were rescued by Jane (United Kingdom). She was subsequently taken into Terschelling, Friesland, Netherlands.
Hotspur	United Kingdom	The ship was abandoned in the North Sea.
Idea	United Kingdom	The ship was severely damaged at Limerick.
Isabel	United Kingdom	The ship was presumed to have foundered during the Night of the Big Wind.
Isabella	United Kingdom	The ship was driven ashore at Carlisle, Cumberland. She was refloated on 26 January and sailed for Belfast, County Antrim.
Jane and Maria	United Kingdom	The ship was driven ashore at "Neumühlen" before 22 January.
John and Amelia	United Kingdom	The ship foundered in the North Sea 30 nautical miles (56 km) off Heligoland. She was on a voyage from London to Stockton-on-Tees, County Durham. The wreck drove ashore on Eierland, North Holland on 11 January.
John and Jane	United Kingdom	The ship was presumed to have foundered, probably during the Night of the Big Wind.
Louise	Prussia	The ship was driven ashore whilst on a voyage from Libau to and English port. She was refloated and put into Copenhagen, Denmark.
Maria Charlotte	Netherlands	The ship was wrecked off "Garrup". She was on a voyage from Riga, Russia to Rotterdam, South Holland.
Marquis of Huntley	United Kingdom	The ship was driven ashore in the Copeland Islands, County Down before 5 January. She was on a voyage from Dundalk, County Louth to Islay, Inner Hebrides. Marquis of Huntley was refloated on 19 January and put into Belfast for repairs.
Mary	United Kingdom	The ship was driven ashore at Workington, Cumberland. She was on a voyage from Chepstow, Monmouthshire to Workington.
Mary Ann	United Kingdom	The ship was driven ashore and wrecked at Innermessan, Wigtownshire.
Mary Ann	United Kingdom	The ship was driven ashore and wrecked at Coleraine, County Antrim.
Mary Read	United Kingdom	The ship was driven ashore at Sligo. She had been refloated by 18 January.
Menado	Netherlands	The ship was driven ashore whilst on a voyage from Surabaya to Batavia, Netherlands East Indies. She was refloated and put back to Surabaya.
Mercurius	United Kingdom	The ship was driven ashore derelict on the west coast of Jutland. May be the same ship as Mercury abandoned on 7 January.
Nordsternira	Norway	The ship was abandoned whilst on a voyage from Christiania to Cherbourg, Seine-Inférieure, France. She was later taken into Mandal, Norway.
Pearl	United Kingdom	The ship was driven ashore at Ramsey, Isle of Man. She was on a voyage from Liverpool to Glasgow. Pearl was refloated on 29 January and taken into Ramsey.
Pomona	United Kingdom	The ship ran aground on the Wheburn Steel. She was later refloated.
Peter	United Kingdom	The ship was abandoned off Heligoland on or before 21 January.
Prince Royal	United Kingdom	The ship departed from Newcastle upon Tyne, Northumberland for Messina, Sicily before 7 January. No further trace, presumed foundered with the loss of all hands.
Riches	United Kingdom	The ship was lost in the Dogger Bank. Her crew were rescued. She was on a voyage from Great Yarmouth to Newcastle upon Tyne.
Sally	United Kingdom	The ship foundered off the coast of County Galway before 17 January.
San Josef	Spain	The ship was wrecked at the mouth of the Loire. Her crew were rescued. She was on a voyage from Seville to Nantes, Loire-Inférieure.
Sarah Maria	United Kingdom	The ship was driven ashore at Cairn Ryan, Wigtownshire. She was on a voyage from Glasgow to Malta. Sarah Maria was refloated on 29 January.
Screen	United Kingdom	The ship ran aground on the Gridiron and was damaged. She was refloated and taken into South Shields, County Durham for repairs.
Smyrna	United Kingdom	The brig was wrecked in the Dardanelles near Cape St. Angelo, Ottoman Empire with the loss of a crew member. She was on a voyage from Constantinople, Ottoman Empire to London.
Splendid	United Kingdom	The ship was driven ashore on Great Swan Island before 24 January. She was on a voyage from Baltimore, Maryland, United States to Saint John, New Brunswick, British North America. She was refloated and put into Little River in a very leaky condition.
St. Bride	United Kingdom	The ship was driven ashore on the coast of Glamorgan and was abandoned by her crew. She was on a voyage from Bridport, Dorset to Llanelly, Glamorgan. St. Bride was later refloated and taken into Llanelly.
Stella	United Kingdom	The ship was abandoned in the North Sea 30 nautical miles (56 km) off Spurn Point, Yorkshire.
Susan and Jane	United Kingdom	The ship was driven ashore at Ramsey. She was on a voyage from Liverpool to Donegal. Sarah and Jane was refloated on 29 January and taken into Ramsey.
Talbot Castle	United Kingdom	The ship was driven ashore. She was later refloated and taken into Glasgow, where she arrived on 26 January.
Tiger	United Kingdom	The ship was driven ashore at Port Patrick, Wigtownshire.
Trial	United Kingdom	The ship was driven ashore at Belfast. She was on a voyage from Glasgow to Belfast.
Union	United Kingdom	The ship was driven ashore and wrecked at Wexford. She was on a voyage from Chepstow, Monmouthshire to Wexford.
Venus	United Kingdom	The ship was driven ashore near Easington, County Durham. She was on a voyage from King's Lynn, Norfolk to Goole, Yorkshire. Venus was refloated on 20 January and take into Hull, Yorkshire.
Ward	United Kingdom	The ship was abandoned in the Atlantic Ocean before 6 January.
Waterwitch	United Kingdom	The ship was driven ashore at Limerick. She was refloated on 17 January.
