= Michael Burke (poet) =

Irish poet

Michael Burke (Irish: Mícheál de Búrca or Mícheál de Búrc; c. 1800 – 6 July 1881) was an Irish poet.

== Biography ==
Born sometime about 1800 in the townland of Bresk, parish of Kiltullagh, four miles east of Athenry town, Burke was educated at the nearby Dominican College at Esker. In time he became schoolmaster at Esker National School, hence his nickname,The Schoolmaster of Esker. Writing in 2018, Martyn said of him:

Many details of his early life remain unknown. The only man of the name documented in the 1821 census is thirty-two year old Michael Burke, his twenty-six year old wife, Mary, and their two year old daughter, Mary; but Michael is listed as a "Farmer & Labourer" (Mary a "Flax spinner") and resided at "Careenlea, Kiltullagh". Therefore, identifying him with Micheál de Búrc is problematic.

Known as a good scholar who spoke, read and wrote in Latin, Greek, Irish and English, Burke emigrated to the United States sometime after 1839. Jeremiah O'Donovan Rossa wrote that as of 1853, "He teaches in the [Roman Catholic] Orphan Asylum in Brooklyn .. is both a scholar and poet, and composes in the Irish language". Burke died at his home in Brooklyn in 1881.

== Oíche na Gaoithe Móire ==
Burke's chief claim to fame is the poem Oíche na Gaoithe Móire (Night of the Big Wind), concerning a severe windstorm which swept across Ireland on the night of 6–7 January 1839 causing severe damage to property and several hundred deaths. According to Mary Burke,

The hurricane-like storm of 1839 arrived suddenly after a strangely calm day, plunging towns into immediate darkness, which magnified the terror. Author Peter Carr notes that eddying winds caused the contents of houses to dance in the air and the din forced those huddled together to sign in order to communicate. Thousands hastily abandoned badly built and suddenly roofless houses, innumerable farm animals perished, and the Shannon flooded vast areas of the surrounding countryside. ... Irish-speaking areas constituted the island’s poorest and most isolated regions, so there is a double silence to their unrecorded and unrecordable suffering.

Oíche ... runs to fifteen verses which give a very vivid description of the event, comparing it to God venting his anger as he did with the Deluge. However, Burke noted that the damage caused made good work for tradesmen such as thatchers, slaters, carpenters and masons. While Martyn notes that the poem "was well known in Burke's lifetime ... both he and it had been entirely forgotten by the 1900s, even in his home parish, as was the language in which it was composed."
