= Night of the Big Wind =

1839 European windstorm

Meteorological history
- Duration: 6 January 1839

Extratropical cyclone
- Highest gusts: 185 km/h (115 mph)
- Lowest pressure: 918 hPa (mbar); 27.11 inHg

Overall effects
- Fatalities: 250–300
- Damage: £500,000
- Areas affected: United Kingdom of Great Britain and Ireland

The Night of the Big Wind (Irish: Oíche na Gaoithe Móire) was a powerful European windstorm that swept across what was then the United Kingdom of Great Britain and Ireland, beginning on the afternoon of 6 January 1839, causing severe damage to property and several hundred deaths. 20 to 25% of houses in north Dublin were damaged or destroyed, and 42 ships were wrecked. The storm attained a very low barometric pressure of 918–922 hPa (27.1–27.2 inHg) (Note: Average atmospheric pressure at sea level is 1,013 hPa (29.9 inHg); the lowest ever recorded on Earth (excluding tornados) was 870 hPa (26 inHg) during the 1979 Typhoon Tip.) and tracked eastwards to the north of Ireland, with gusts of over 100 knots (185 km/h; 115 mph) before moving across the north of England to continental Europe, where it eventually dissipated. It has been described as probably worst storm to hit Ireland in the last 300 years. Liverpool also suffered severely, with many shipwrecks and much structural damage. 120 people died as a result of such accidents in the city alone. Two major shipwrecks resulted in damage of at least £500,000, equivalent to £45,000,000 in 2025.

== Meteorological situation ==
The storm developed after a period of unusual weather. Heavy snow, rare in Ireland, fell across the country on the night of 5 January, which was replaced on the morning of 6 January by an Atlantic warm front, which brought a period of complete calm with dense, motionless, cloud cover. Through the day, temperatures rose well above their seasonal average, resulting in rapid melting of the snow.

Later on 6 January, a deep Atlantic depression began to move towards Ireland, forming a cold front when it collided with the warm air over land, bringing strong winds and heavy rain. First reports of stormy weather came from western County Mayo around noon, and the storm moved very slowly across the island through the day, gathering strength as it moved. By midnight the winds reached hurricane force.

== Damage ==
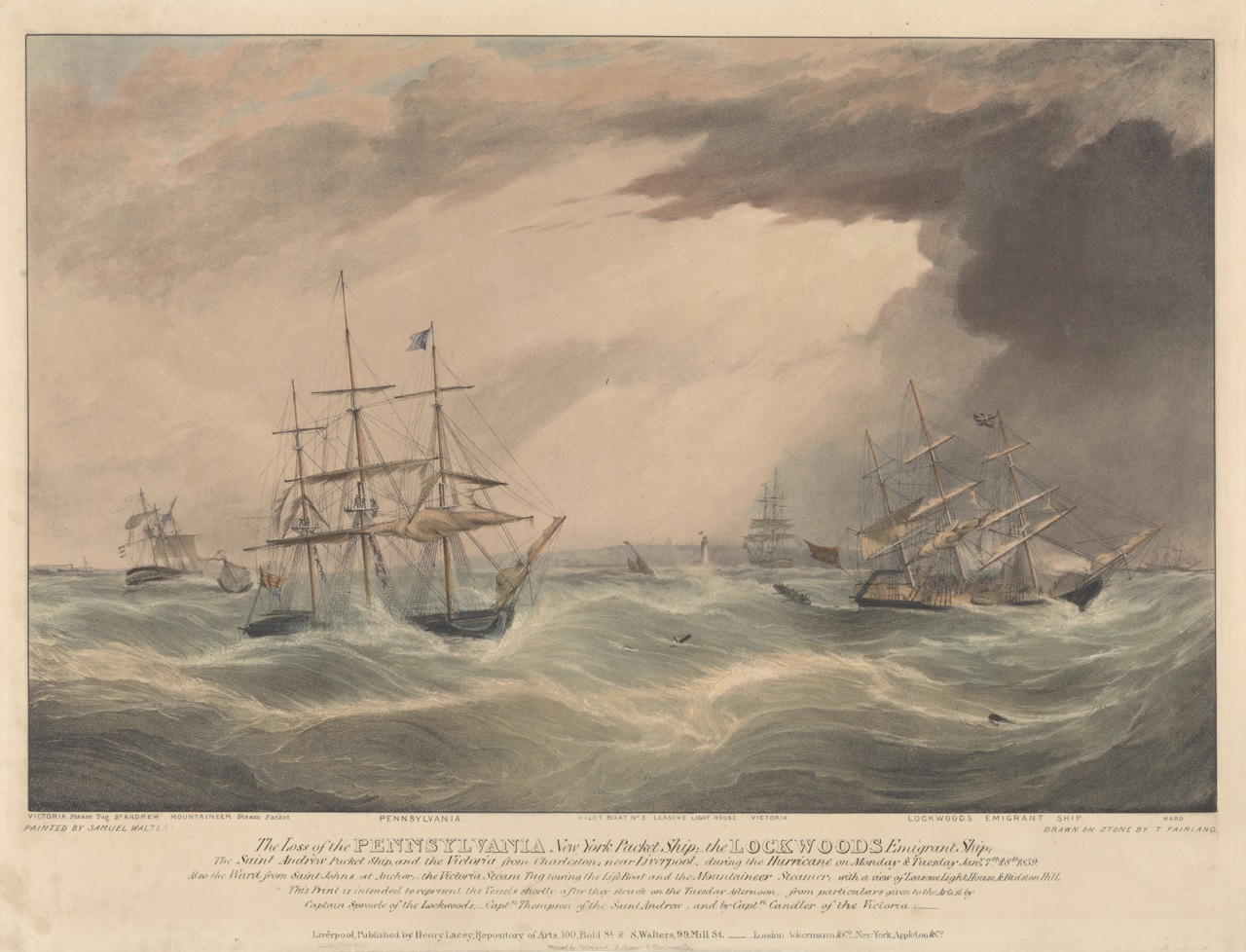
The Loss of the Pennsylvania New York Packet Ship; the Lockwoods Emigrant Ship; the Saint Andrew Packet Ship; and the Victoria from Charleston, near Liverpool during the Hurricane on Monday and Tuesday 7–8 January 1839

Contemporary accounts of damage indicate that the Night of the Big Wind was the most severe storm to affect Ireland for many centuries. It is estimated that between 250 and 300 people lost their lives in the storm. Severe property damage was caused, particularly in Connacht, but also in Ulster and northern Leinster. Between a fifth and a quarter of all houses in Dublin suffered damage ranging from broken windows to complete destruction. Much of the inland damage was caused by a storm surge that drew large quantities of sea water inland, resulting in widespread flooding.

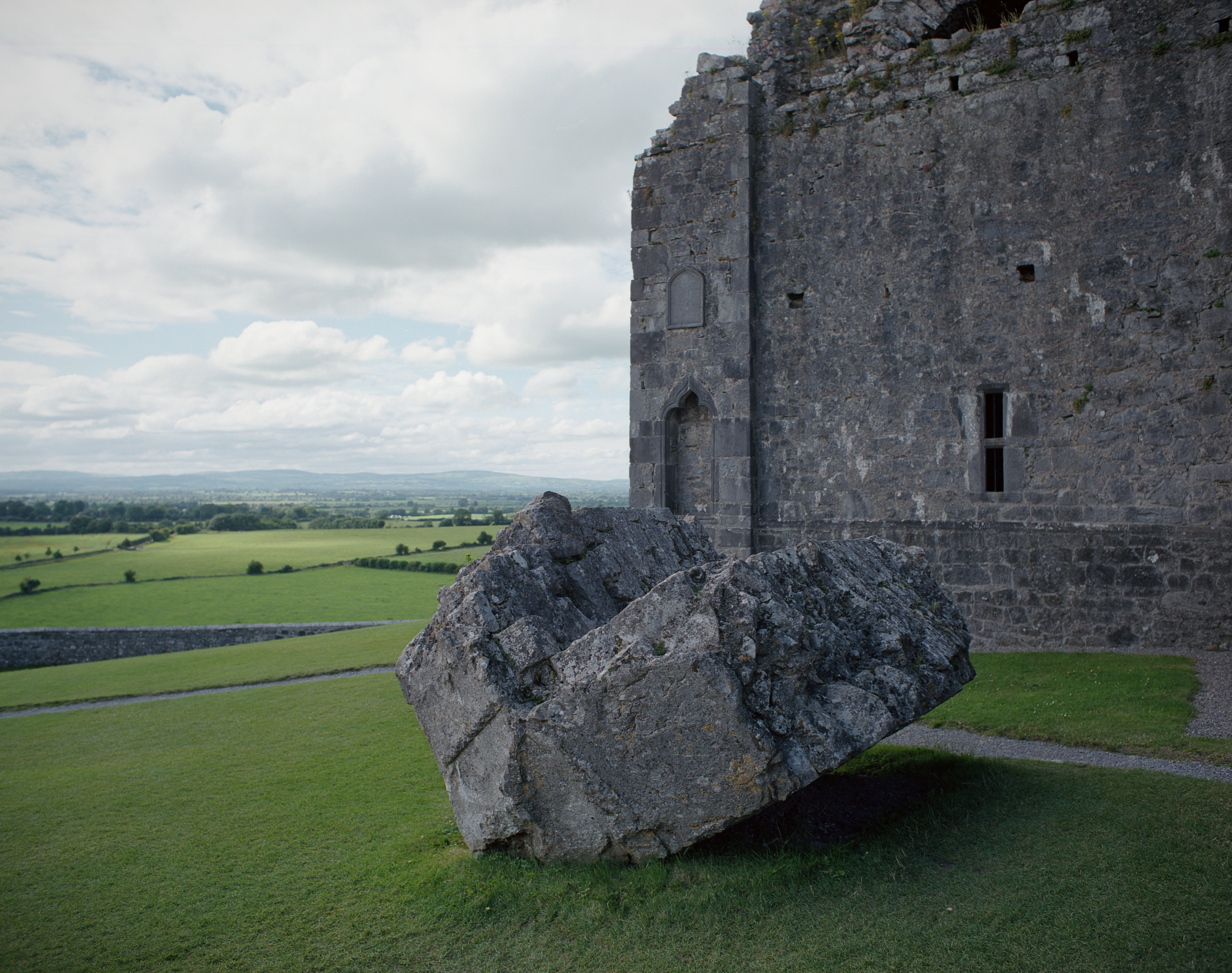
A chunk of the Bishop's Palace on the Rock of Cashel, Ireland, traditionally said to have blown down in the Big Wind.

Even well-built buildings suffered structural damage, including new factories and military barracks. The newly constructed St. Mary's Roman Catholic Church in Derrytrasna was completely destroyed; one of the steeples of the Church of Ireland church in Castlebar was blown down, and a number of large country houses were unroofed. Among the poorly built homes of the poor, damage was more severe and many were completely destroyed. A total of 42 ships, most along the less sheltered west coast, were wrecked while unsuccessfully trying to ride out the storm: a majority of the recorded casualties occurred at sea.

Stacks of hay and corn were widely destroyed, resulting in severe starvation among livestock in the following months.

== Legacy ==
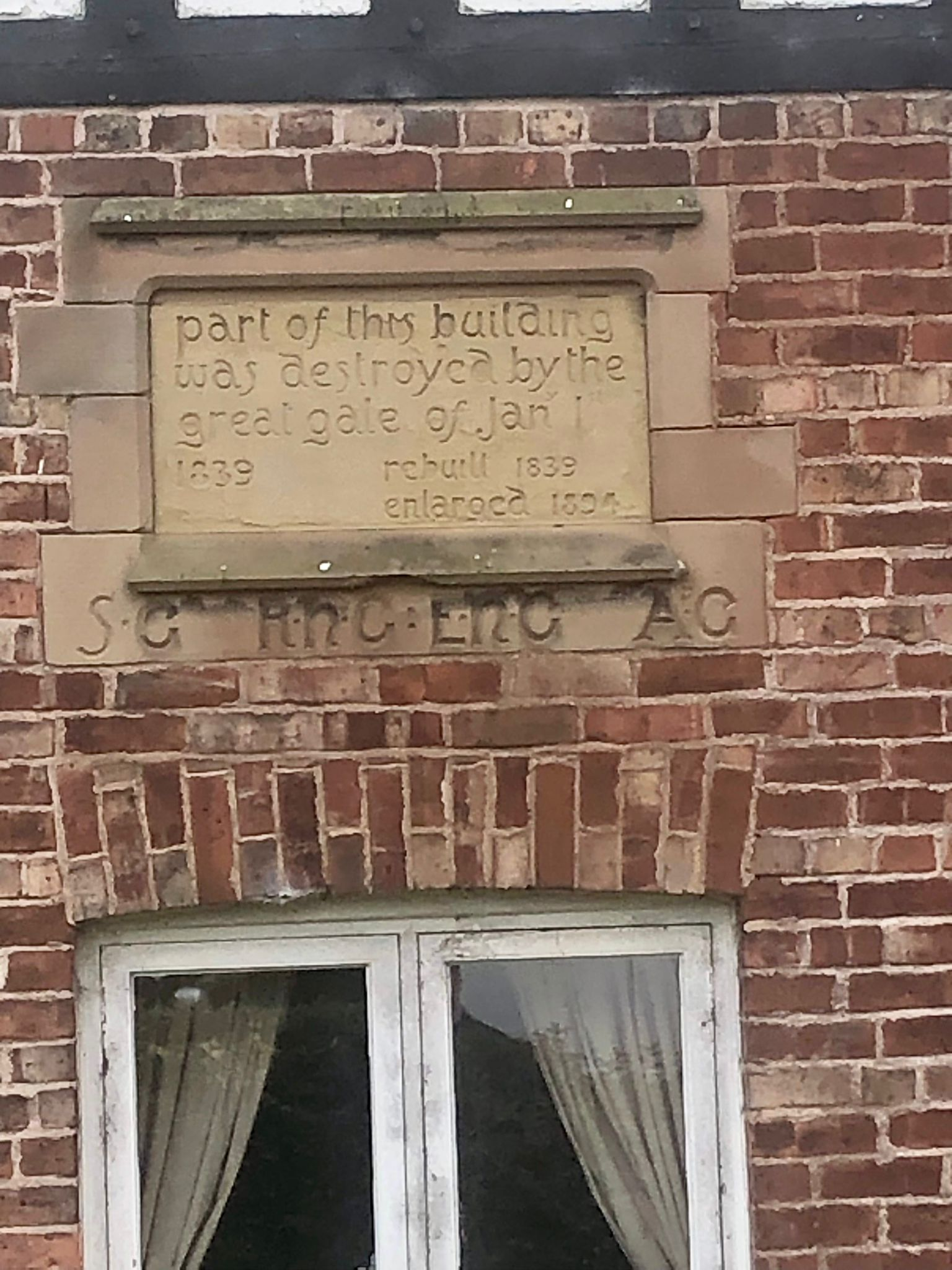
Plaque on a building in Styal, Cheshire noting that it was damaged in the event. Plaque reads: "part of this building was destroyed by the great gale of Jan 1st [sic] 1839"

The Night of the Big Wind became part of Irish folk tradition. Irish folklore held that Judgment Day would occur on the Feast of the Epiphany, 6 January. Such a severe storm led many to believe that the end of the world was at hand.

The Old Age Pensions Act 1908 introduced pensions for over-70s, but many Irish Catholics prior to the Registration of Births and Deaths (Ireland) Act 1863 had no birth registration. One of the questions used to establish proof of age was whether the applicant remembered the Night of the Big Wind. The question was also used as an aide-memoire for the 1901 census.

== Related writing ==
Irish language poems about the event include "Oíche na Gaoithe Móire" by Micheál de Búrc (c.1800–1881) and "Oíche Nollaig na mBan" by Seán Ó Ríordáin (1916–1977). The latter's title means "Night of Women's Christmas"; Women's Christmas is observed in Ireland on the feast of the Epiphany (6 January). The first verse describes a storm on that date (5 January) while the second recounts the poet's desire that his eventual death should coincide with a similar storm.

== See also ==
- List of shipwrecks in January 1839
- List of atmospheric pressure records in Europe
- Braer Storm
